= Siege of Oreshek (1611–1612) =

Battle in Russia in 1611–1612

- Part of the Ingrian War
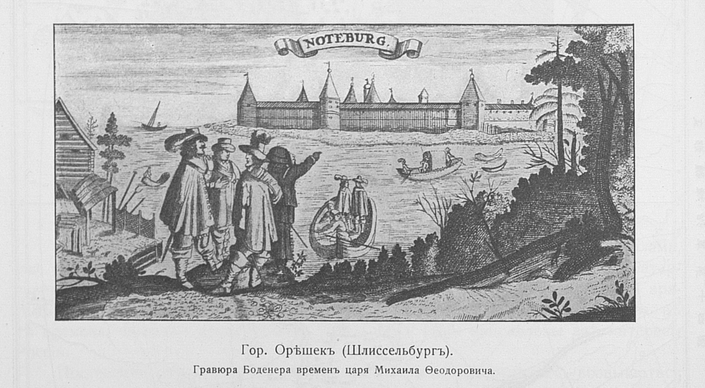
- Nöteborg Fortress in an engraving by Moritz Bodenehr
Date	September 1611 – 12 May 1612
Location	Oreshek, Tsardom of Russia
Result	Swedish victory
Territorial changes	Oreshek is occupied by the Swedes

Belligerents
Swedish Empire	Tsardom of Russia

Commanders and leaders
(Swedish Empire) Evert Horn (Swedish Empire) Claës Ericsson Slang	(Tsardom of Russia) Venedikt Khomutov

Units involved
Unknown	(Tsardom of Russia) Oreshek garrison

Strength
5,000	1,300

Casualties and losses
Unknown	1,200 dead

The siege of Oreshek (1611–1612) was the Swedish capture of the fortress of Oreshek after an eight-month siege during the Ingrian War of 1610–1617.

== Background ==
By the end of 1611, the Swedes, taking advantage of the difficult situation of Russia in connection with the Polish-Lithuanian intervention captured most of the Novgorod land including the fortresses of Korela, Yam and Ivangorod. After the capture of Novgorod in 1611, it was garrisoned by troops under the command of Jacob De la Gardie.

The first attempt to take Oreshek took place in February 1611, when De la Gardie ordered the fortress to be stormed, blowing up two front gates with explosives. However, the third iron gate, according to Johan Widekindi, proved too tough for the attackers and they retreated after losing 20 men.

== Siege ==
The second attempt began in September 1611, when the Swedes, having captured Ladoga, again sent significant forces to Oreshek and blocked its approaches, seeking to starve it out. The new commander of the siege, the future Field Marshal Evert Horn, after November 30, offered the besieged "good terms" for surrender. The townspeople were required to submit to the royal governor and accept the Swedish garrison. The archers defending the fortress refused to discuss its surrender. Oreshkovites used a secret harbor to sortie out on boats and attack the Swedes. By April 1612 food shortages had made the situation critical. Hunger set in and disease began to rage. According to Widekindi, out of 1,300 defenders some 100 remained, and on 12 May the fortress capitulated.

== Aftermath ==
The Swedes occupied the fortress and refortified it. The city was renamed Nöteborg and remained in the hands of the Swedes until 1702, when Peter the Great took the fortress and renamed it Shlisselburg.

== Bibliography ==
- A. N. Kirpichnikov, V. M. Savkov. Fortress Oreshek. 2nd edition. Lenizdat, 1979
