= Capture of Novgorod (1611) =

Part of the Ingrian War

- Part of the Ingrian War
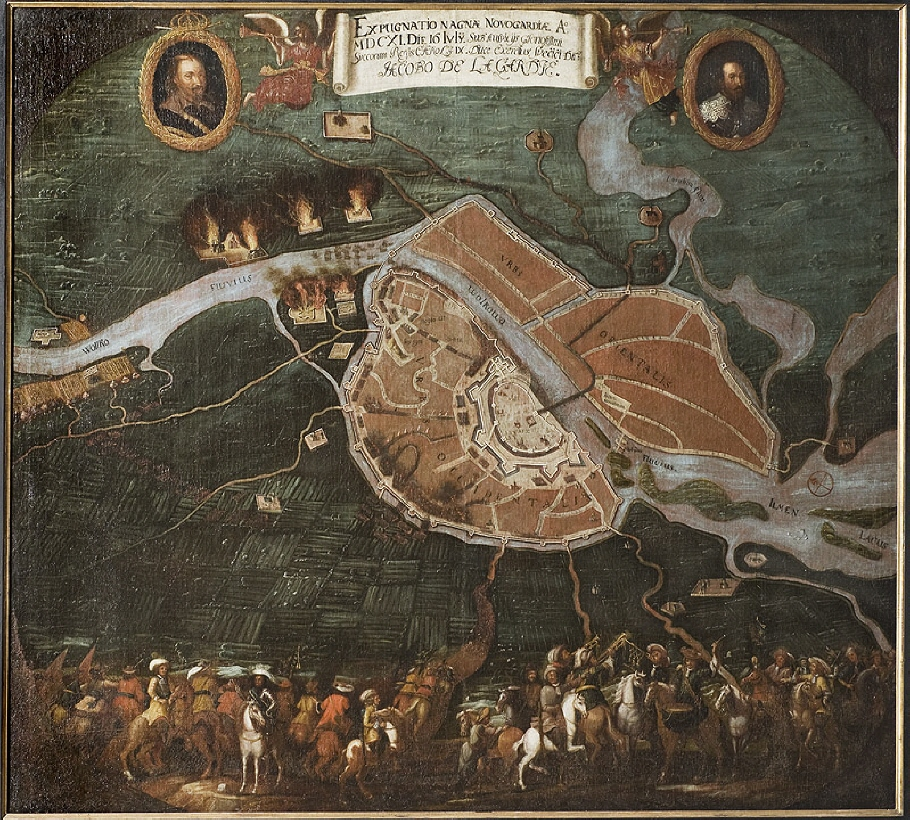
- The siege of Novgorod in 1611, painting by Johan Hammer
Date	8–17 July 1611
Location	Novgorod, Russia
Result	Swedish victory
Territorial changes	Novgorod is occupied by Sweden

Belligerents
(yes) Swedish Empire	Tsardom of Russia

Commanders and leaders
(yes) Jacob De la Gardie (yes) Evert Horn	Ivan Odoevsky; Vasily Buturlin

Units involved
Unknown	Novgorod Garrison

Strength
Unknown	2,000

Casualties and losses
Unknown	Unknown

The capture of Novgorod occurred during the Time of Troubles, which entailed the Swedish occupation of Novgorod from July 1611 until its return to Russia in 1617 as a result of the Treaty of Stolbovo.

== Background ==
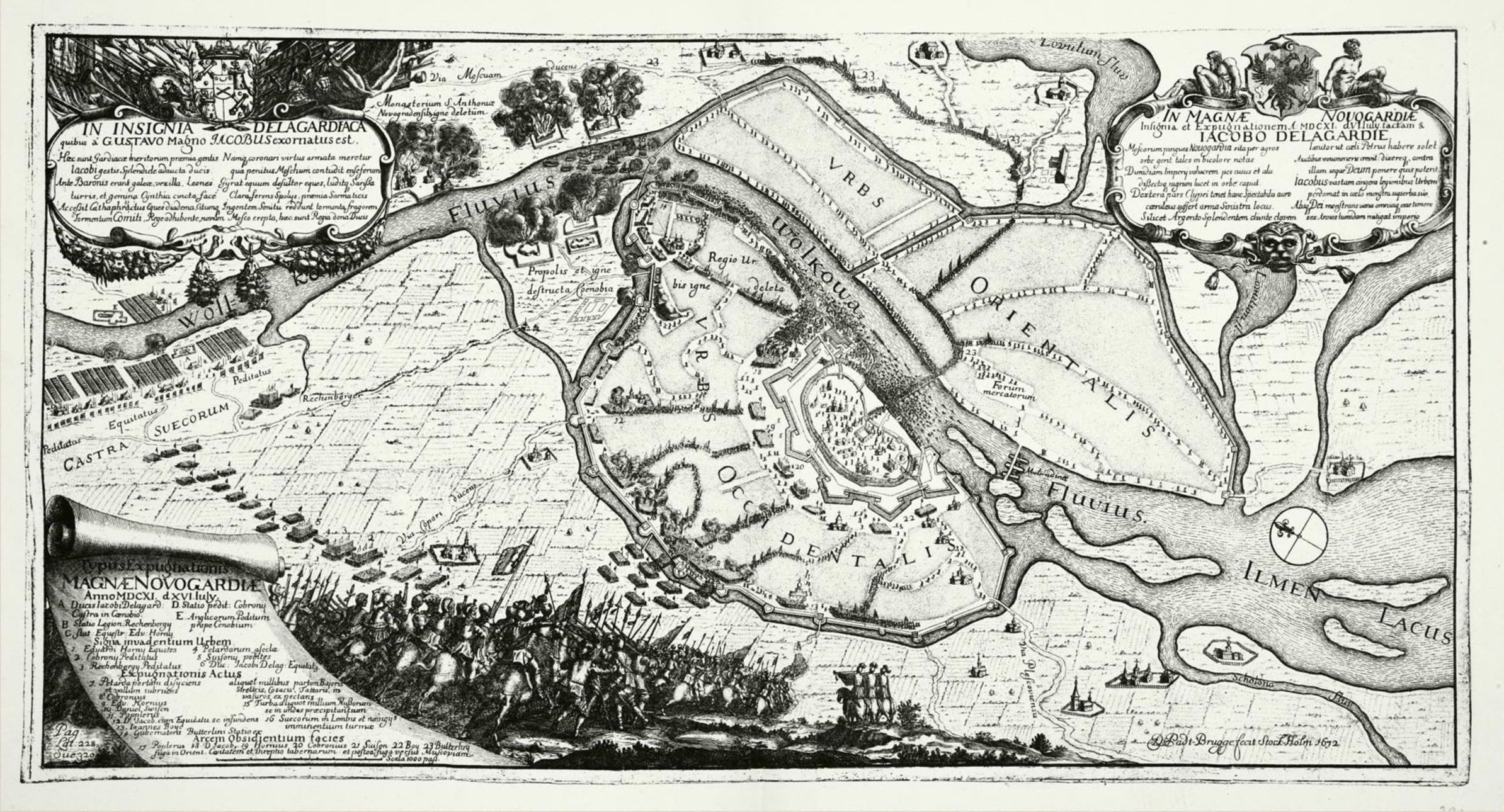
Plan of the siege of Novgorod

According to the Vyborg Treatise of 1609, which was concluded between Tsar Vasily Shuisky and Sweden, the latter agreed to provide him with military assistance in the fight against False Dmitry II and the Polish–Lithuanian invaders in exchange for territorial concessions. Russia renounced all claims on the coast of the Baltic Sea and returned Kexholm to Sweden, while Sweden agreed to send a force of 5,000 men to help fight the tsar's enemies during the Time of Troubles.

By the end of March, the Swedish force led by Jacob De la Gardie were in the vicinity of Novgorod, and his force were made up of mercenaries of different nationalities, including English, French, Finnish, German, Scottish and Swedish. In May, the De la Gardie campaign began, where the Swedish corps fought as part of the army of Prince Mikhail Skopin-Shuisky, who managed to clear a significant part of Russia from the interventionists and to release the besieged Moscow. In total, Skopin-Shuisky had a force of 2,000 men while De la Gardie had a force of 10,000 men. After the sudden death of Skopin-Shuisky, De la Gardie's troops were merged with Shuisky's army, after which they were defeated at the battle of Klushino on 4 July [O.S. 24 June] 1610. De la Gardie concluded an agreement with Polish hetman Stanisław Żółkiewski and went to Novgorod with a force of 300 men; however, the Novgorodians refused to let him enter the city and recommended he leave for Sweden.

After Vasily Shuisky was deposed by the Seven Boyars, De la Gardie sought to take control of the Russian north–west in order to prevent the Poles from extending their power to this region and therefore threaten Sweden's Baltic territories. In August 1610, De la Gardie wrote letters urging the authorities in Moscow and Novgorod not to elect Władysław as the tsar of Russia, instead advising them to elect a son of the king of Sweden or one of his relatives. In August, the boyar council elected Władysław and the Poles marched to Moscow, after which the Russian state began to fall into its constituent parts. After an anti-Polish rebellion in Moscow, the Novgorodians sided with the popular militia and sent an appeal to other cities to join them in their struggle. The Novgorodians had also announced their intention of sending forces to the militia.

At the start of March 1611, the Swedes lost Kexholm and De la Gardie sent a colonel to Novgorod to find out whether the city still recognized the Vyborg Treatise and considered the Swedes to be their allies. However, no clear response was received. In March, Charles IX of Sweden had sent a letter to Novgorod, in which he promised the Novgorodians in helping them against the Poles. In May, the representative of the militia force arrived in Novgorod under instruction to join the Novgorodian authorities in negotiating with De la Gardie. The Swedes then advanced to Novgorod and camped at Khutyn Monastery outside the city in the middle of June. De la Gardie was under instruction to take control of the fortresses of Ivangorod, Oreshek, Koporye, Gdov and Ladoga. The leaders of the militia were willing to accept Sweden's demands, but the Novgorodians were outraged. The representative of the militia, Vasily Buturlin, was unable to secure an agreement with the authorities of Novgorod, and therefore decided to start separate negotiations with Sweden. Buturlin asked De la Gardie to send troops as soon as possible and he revived the idea of putting forward a Swedish duke as a candidate for the throne.

The Polish governor of Moscow declared war on the militia force and on 23 June, the Council of the Whole Land decided to elect one of the sons of Charles IX as the sovereign, tsar and grand prince of all Russia. On 2 July, the declaration of the militia force reached Novgorod, but the Novgorodians failed this pass this on to De la Gardie. The authorities of Novgorod also decided to pursue their own negotiations with Sweden, and according to a draft treaty, the Vyborg Treatise was to be reaffirmed, and De la Gardie was to purge the fortresses, but not annex those territories, while the treaty emphasizes that Swedish troops could not enter the district of Novgorod and Nöteborg. In addition, there is no mention of a Swedish duke being elected as tsar. As negotiations stalled, De la Gardie decided to storm Novgorod in order to force the Novgorodians to accept his own terms.

== Storming of Novgorod ==
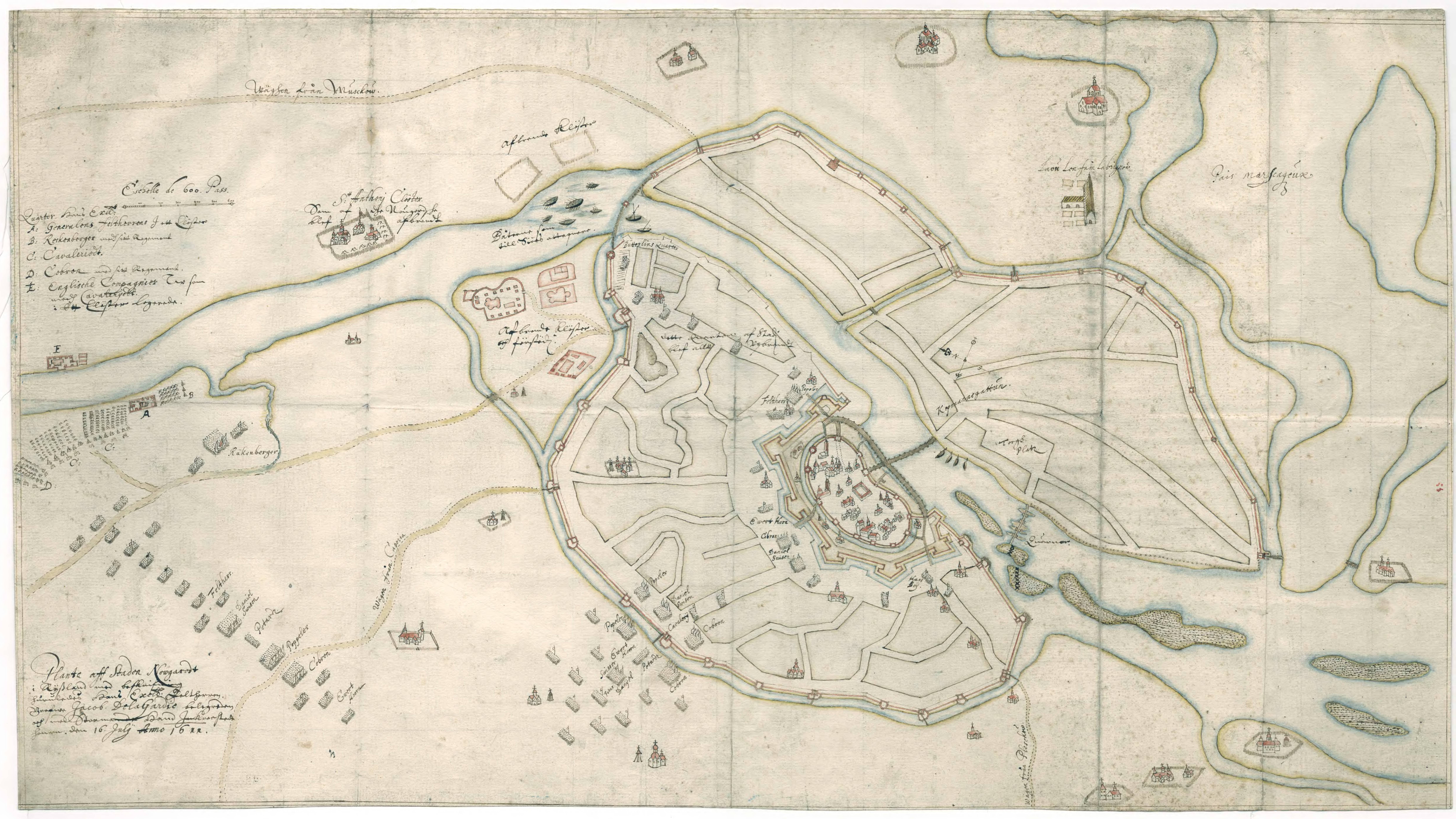
Map showing the events of the capture of Novgorod

The governor of the city was Ivan Nikitich Odoevsky, who led a garrison of a little more than two thousand people – Cossacks, nobles, Astrakhan archers, as well as a small number of Tatars and monastery servants. The garrison had at its disposal relatively large artillery, but the city fortifications were dilapidated.

On 8 July, the Swedes attacked Okolny City, but it was repelled. On July 12, city defenders made a sortie. On July 16, De la Gardie launched a second decisive assault. A small detachment was instructed to make a distracting maneuver from the east side of the city. Another distracting maneuver was the attack of the Swedes in small vessels on a floating tower, set by the defenders on the Volkhov near Borisoglebskaya and Petrovskaya towers. Taking advantage of the fact that the defenders focused on the defense of the eastern side and did not expect an attack from the west, the De la Gardie warriors went on the assault on Okolny City in several areas at once. Most successfully they acted near the Chudintsev Gate, laying several firecrackers. Sources report assistance to the Swedes from a certain Ivashka Shval, a boyar slave. The infantry rushed into the resulting gaps, which soon recaptured the Chudintsev Gates from the defenders and opened them to De la Gardie's strong cavalry. From the towers of Okolny City, the Russians methodically fired on the Swedes, however, after the cavalry attack, which began to quickly take over the streets, the fate of the city, despite the stubborn foci of resistance, was a foregone conclusion. A fire and general panic began in the city. Buturlin's warriors, who didn't initially have a good relationship with Odoevsky, after a brief resistance to the Swedes fled to the Trade Side, robbing its along the way, and then retreated to Yaroslavl. With a quick strike, the Swedes captured the Great Bridge over the Volkhov, cutting off the remaining defenders' path to retreat.

Having taken the Okolny City, De la Gardie entered into negotiations with the people of Prince Odoyevsky, who were in the detinets. Due to the futility of further resistance, an agreement was concluded under which De la Gardie joined the Detinets on July 17. Novgorod completely came under the control of the Swedes.

== Aftermath ==
Odoevsky signed a treaty with De la Gardie "on behalf of the Novgorod state", according to which the Swedish king Charles IX was recognized as the "patron of Russia", and the prince Charles Philip as the "heir to the Russian throne". The accession to the treaty of the "Moscow and Vladimir States" was welcomed. Prior to the arrival of the prince, the contract provided for the transfer of control to De la Gardie and Swedish officials. In fact, the agreement concluded meant the separation of Novgorod land from the general Zemstvo movement of Russia.

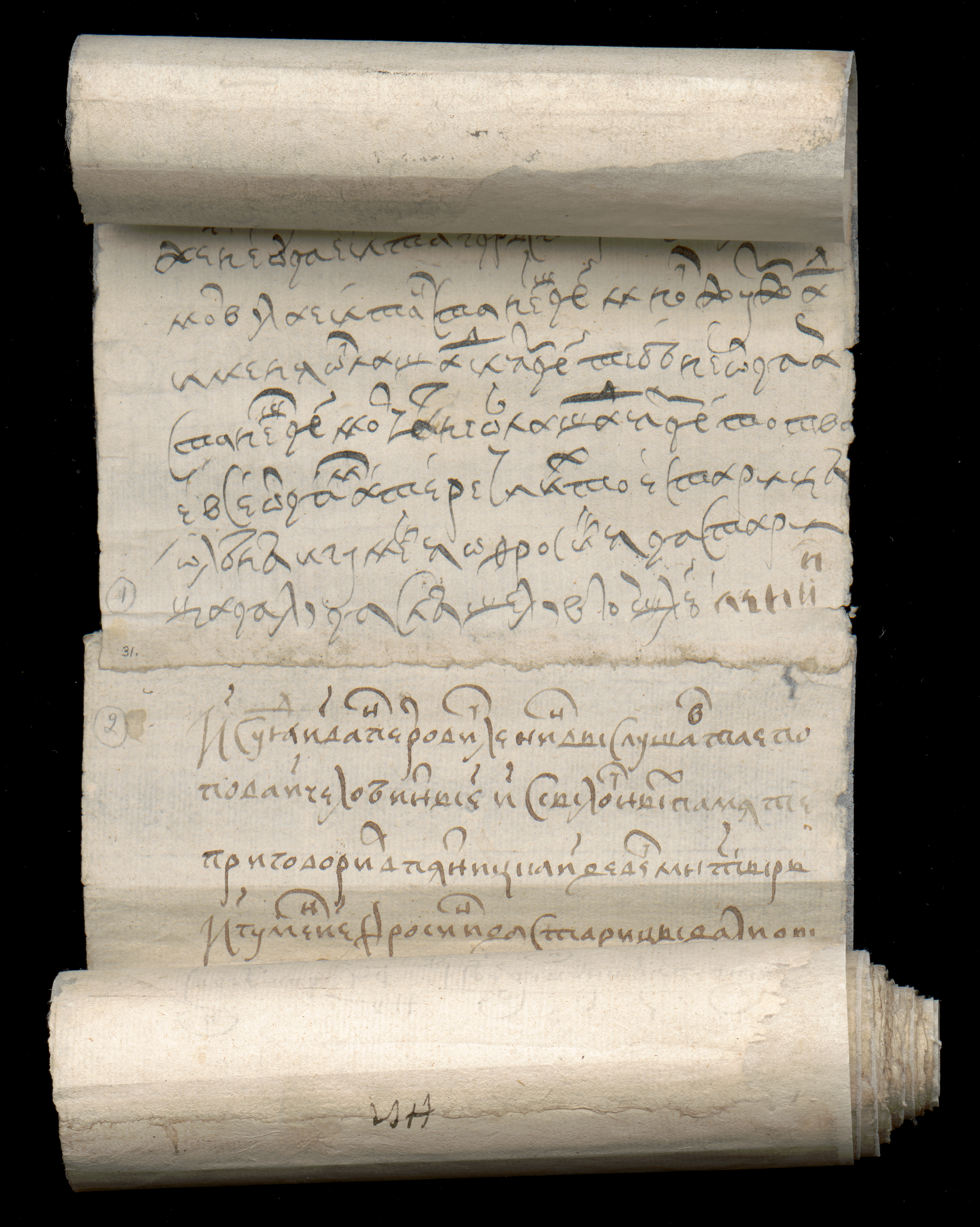
Document from the Novgorod occupation archive. Held at the Swedish National Archive.

The rest of the agreement repeated the provisions of the Teusina and Vyborg Treaties, maintained the old order in administration and legal proceedings, guaranteed the inviolability of the Orthodox faith and emphasized the alliance against the Commonwealth. The Swedish administration was carried out according to Russian laws and was duplicated by the Novgorod administration. The sympathies of the nobility were attracted by generous land awards on behalf of the prince. Novgorodians pledged to support the Swedes in their hostilities.

After the election of Mikhail Romanov to the kingdom in 1613 and the loss by the Swedish king of the chances of the Moscow throne, the Swedish position in Novgorod was tightened. Evert Horn, who ruled Novgorod in 1614–1615, pursued a policy of direct subordination of Novgorod to the Swedish crown. Only the military failures of the Swedes, in particular during the Siege of Pskov in 1615, set King Gustav II Adolf to peace talks.

Novgorod returned to Moscow under the Treaty of Stolbovo of 1617. One of the most complete collections of documents of Novgorod office work during the Swedish occupation is the Novgorod occupation archive, which is stored in the National Archive of Sweden in Stockholm.

== Sources ==
- Kobzareva, Elena. Swedish Occupation of Novgorod During the Time of Troubles of the 17th Century / Elena Kobzareva – Moscow: Institute of Russian History, Russian Academy of Sciences, 2005
- Löfstrand, Elisabeth (2005). Accounts of an occupied city: catalogue of the Novgorod Occupation Archives 1611-1617. Series 1. Stockholm: Riksarkivet. ISBN 91-88366-67-7.
- Selin, Adrian. Novgorod Society in the Time of Troubles – Saint Petersburg, 2008
- Shepelev, Ivan. Swedish Intervention in Russia and the Attitude of the First Zemstvo Militia Towards It // Collection of Scientific Papers of the Pyatigorsk State Pedagogical Institute – Pyatigorsk, 1949. Issue 4
- Zamyatin, German. Russia and Sweden at the Beginning of the 17th Century – Saint Petersburg, 2008
