= Samuel Cockburn (mercenary) =

Coordinates: 60°27′09″N 22°16′41″E

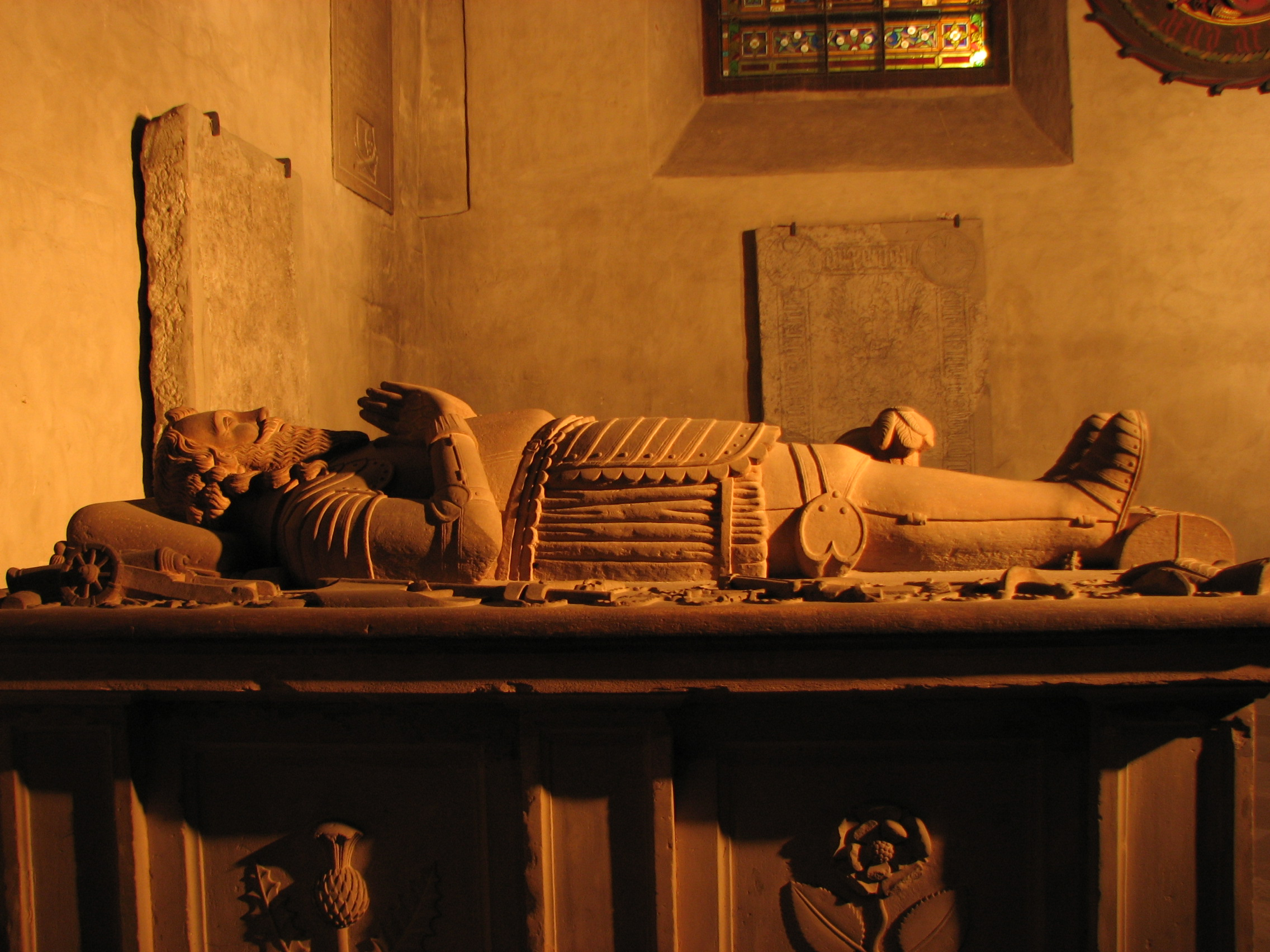
- Cockburn's tomb in Turku cathedral
- Born: 1574; Scotland
- Died: 1621 (aged 46–47); Latvia
- Burial place: Turku Cathedral
- Spouse: Barbara Kinnaird
- Relatives: brother Johan Cockburn
- Military career
- Allegiance: Sweden
- Rank: Colonel

Colonel Samuel Cockburn (c. 1574 – December 1621) was a Scottish soldier in the service of Sweden who in 1614 was serving as generalfältvaktmästare of the Swedish field army. He was born around 1574 in Scotland. He entered Swedish service in 1598 where he participated in the Swedish civil war between Sigismund Vasa and his uncle Duke Karl, later Karl IX.

== Mission to James VI ==
Cockburn is listed as one of the Scottish officers who, under the direction of General James Spens, the General of Scottish and English forces in Swedish service, was sent to King James VI and I in 1608/9 seeking levies for Sweden, although one source notes a passport for this purpose issued by the Swedes was dated 17 December 1609. A group of officers went with him including Hugh Cochran, Daniel Rogers, Robert Kinnaird, Patrick Ruthven, John Wauchop, George Douglas and William Horne.

== Baltic wars ==
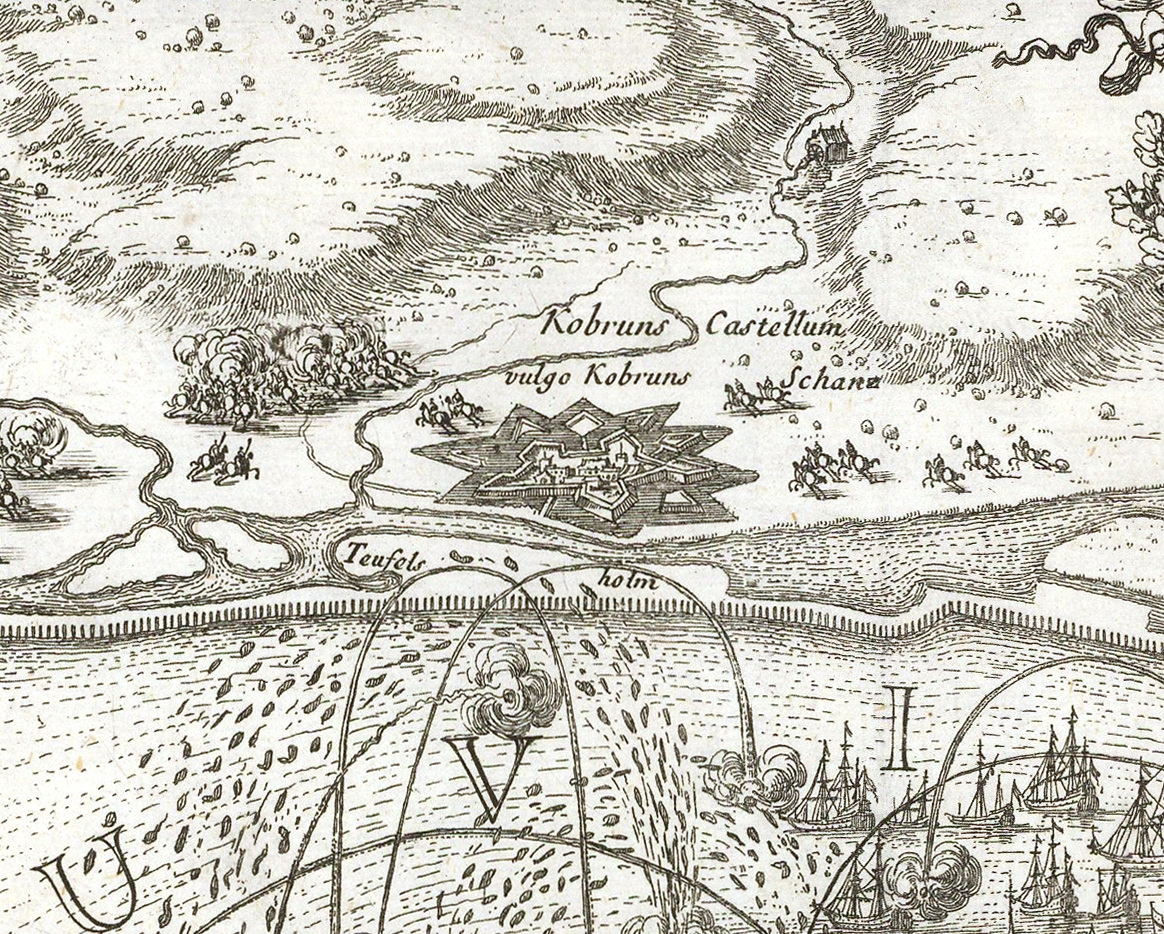
Cobrons skans (Kobruns schanz, Kobron-schanz), a redoubt named after Cockburn during the siege of Riga in 1656

Cockburn served as colonel of a regiment in 1609-10 and took part in Karl IX's and Gustav II Adolf's war in Russia and in the Baltic states. He played a leading role in the Capture of Novgorod on 16 July 1611, in particular, his regiment blew open the town gates. In July 1612, he was sent by Jacob de la Gardie at Novgorod to Gustav II Adolf to seek payment for Cockburn's troops - some of his regiment had already been sent back to Finland for lack of finances. That year 1612 he obtained 301 homesteads in Ostrobothnia as compensation for a claim of 8,000 dalers. On 1 August 1613 Cockburn's troops landed at Narva.

Cockburn was appointed Governor of Dunaw in Livonia, which was called "Fortress Cobron" (Cobrons skans in Swedish) after him. His regiment also formed part of the Swedish forces lent to Muscovy during the hostilities with Poland-Lithuania from 1614 to 1616. He was at the siege of Augdow (now Gdov) and Pskov (1615), and relieved Ladoga. Cockburn's regiment is listed in military payrolls every year from 1611 to 1615, and in 1614 and a register was made of all the sick soldiers under his command. In 1615 there is a note of decommissioning payment for Cockburn and his regiment, and by May 1616 the Swedes were keen to allow the soldiers to rest and recoup in case they were needed again.

According to one source his troops mutinied at Narva in 1616 (?) and he then took command of the Karelia troops. Cockburn tried in vain to get reimbursement for his loans to the Crown in June 1616, although Axel Oxenstierna did intervene on Cockburn's behalf with the bailiff of Porvoo who was preventing the Scotsman from earning his keep from his land. Indeed, when the Swedish-Russian peace looked imminent, Cockburn requested a transfer into Russian service, and in December 1617 this was granted by the Swedes. Cockburn was to ensure that he was only used against Poland and that he was to convince the Tsar that the Poles were weak, being engaged in war with the Turks and facing domestic opposition. Although it is intriguing that a Scotsman was considered for such intricate use in Swedish foreign policy, it appears that Cockburn and his fellow officers never did enter Russian service however. Chancellor Axel Oxenstierna intervened on his behalf in October 1616 with the local baillies of Porvoo and Rassborg to leave Cockburn unmolested.

== Death ==
There is a letter regarding Cockburn and his regiment dated 5 November 1621. At that point he was in active service on Gustav II Adolf's Livonian campaign in the renewed hostilities against Poland. Cockburn served as the commandant at Duna, near Riga in Livonia. One of the rare times Cockburn's troops were negatively described was when they were quartered in three separate villages. Axel Oxenstierna noted that Cockburn was one of the officers killed by illness by 12 February 1622. Jacob de la Gardie records that Colonel Cockburn had died by March 1622, (another source erroneously notes that he died in 1631 in Turku) but he appears to have been buried in 1621 in the Turku Cathedral after a military campaign in Latvia. His brother Johan Cockburn erected a marble monument to his memory. He had been married to Barbara Kinnaird.

== Bibliography ==
- H. Almquist, Sverige och Ryssland 1595-1611 (Uppsala, 1907), p. 271
- G. Arteus, Till Militärstatens Förhistoria: Krig, professionalisering och social förändring under Vasasönernas regering (Stockholm, 1986), p. 170
- T. Cappelan, ed., Finsk Biografisk Handbok, (Helsingfors, 1903), p. 378
- Otto Donner, A brief sketch of the Scottish families in Finland and Sweden (Helsingfors, 1884), p. 23
- G. Elgenstierna, Svenska Adelns Ättartavlor, vol. 5, p. 537
- T. Fischer, The Scots in Sweden (Edinburgh, 1907), p. 72
- R. Frost, "Scottish soldiers, Poland-Lithuania and the Thirty Years' War" in S. Murdoch ed. Scotland and the Thirty Years' War, 1618-1648 (Brill, 2001), p. 199
- A. Grosjean, An Unofficial Alliance: Scotland and Sweden 1569-1654 (Brill, 2003)
- G. Göransson, Gustav Adolf och hans folk (Stockholm, 1994), pp. 64, 81, 122 and biographical appendix
- Sonia E. Howe (edited), 'Narrative of an Englishman serving against Poland' in The False Dmitri. A Russian Romance and Tragedy, Described by British Eye-Witnesses, 1604-1612, (New York, 1916), pp. 151–183
- Steve Murdoch, Network North: Scottish Kin, Commercial and Covert Associations in Northern Europe, 1603-1746 (Brill, Leiden, 2006), p. 256
- A. Norberg, Polen i Svensk Politik, 1617-26, (Norrtalje, 1974), p. 52
- P. Wieselgren, ed. De La Gardiska Archivet, part 10 (Lund, 1838), p. 22
