= Battle of Bronnitsy =

Battle in the Ingrian War

- Part of the Ingrian War
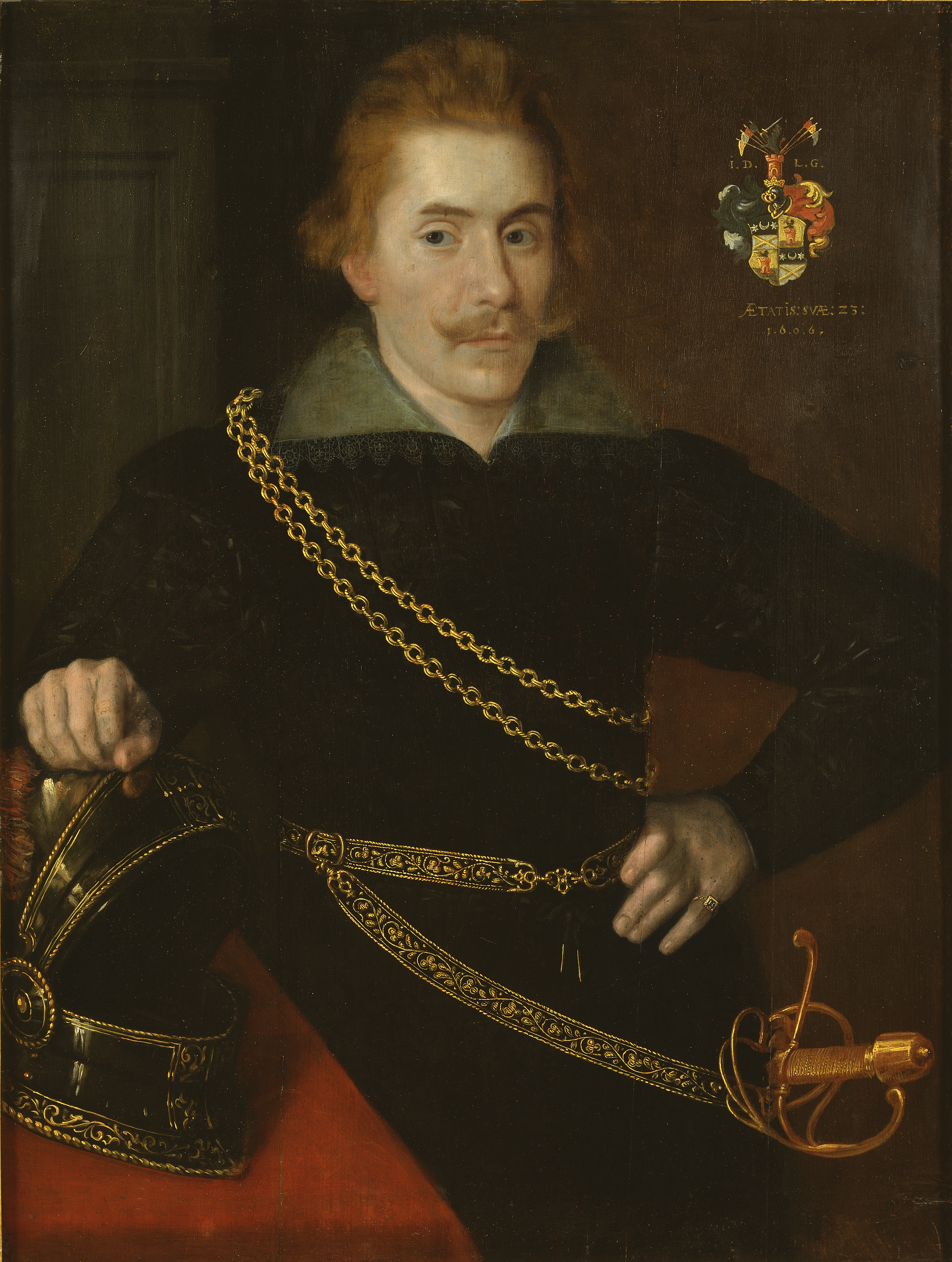
- Jacob De la Gardie
Date	16 July 1614
Location	Bronnitsa, Novgorod Oblast, Russia
Result	Swedish victory

Belligerents
(yes) Swedish Empire	Tsardom of Russia

Commanders and leaders
(Swedish Empire) Jacob De la Gardie	(Tsardom of Russia) Dmitry Troubetskoy

Strength
Few thousand mercenaries	Several thousand militia and Cossacks

Casualties and losses
Light	Heavy

The Battle of Bronnitsy was part of the Ingrian War.

== Prelude ==
After the Battle of Klushino, the Swedish troops located in Russia, called in 1609 by Vasily Shuisky, declared war on Russia and in 1611 occupied Novgorod land. The Siege of Tikhvin in 1613 was unsuccessful for the Swedes, and in spring of 1614, Tsar Michael Romanov sent an army to liberate occupied Novgorod.

== Battle ==
In April 1614, the Russian army made camp near Bronnitsy in Novgorod Oblast, preparing for an offensive against Novgorod. The army consisted primarily of militiamen, marred by weak discipline and conflicts between noblemen and Cossacks. Swedish Governor of Novgorod Jacob De la Gardie decided to act quickly and on July 16, 1614, defeated the Russians in open battle. After that, the Swedes blockaded the Russian camp, where famine soon began. Dmitry Troubetskoy broke through the blockade and retreated to Torzhok, sustaining heavy losses.

== Aftermath ==
As a result of the victory at Bronnitsy, the Swedes regained the military initiative in the Ingrian War and began the siege of Gdov, which guarded the road to Pskov from the north.
