= General Cockburn =

General Cockburn may refer to:

- Francis Cockburn (1780–1868), British Army lieutenant general
- James Pattison Cockburn (1779–1847), British Army major general
- Samuel Cockburn (mercenary) (c. 1574–1621), Scottish-born Swedish Army major general
