= Siege of Pskov (1615) =

Part of the Ingrian War

- Part of the Ingrian War
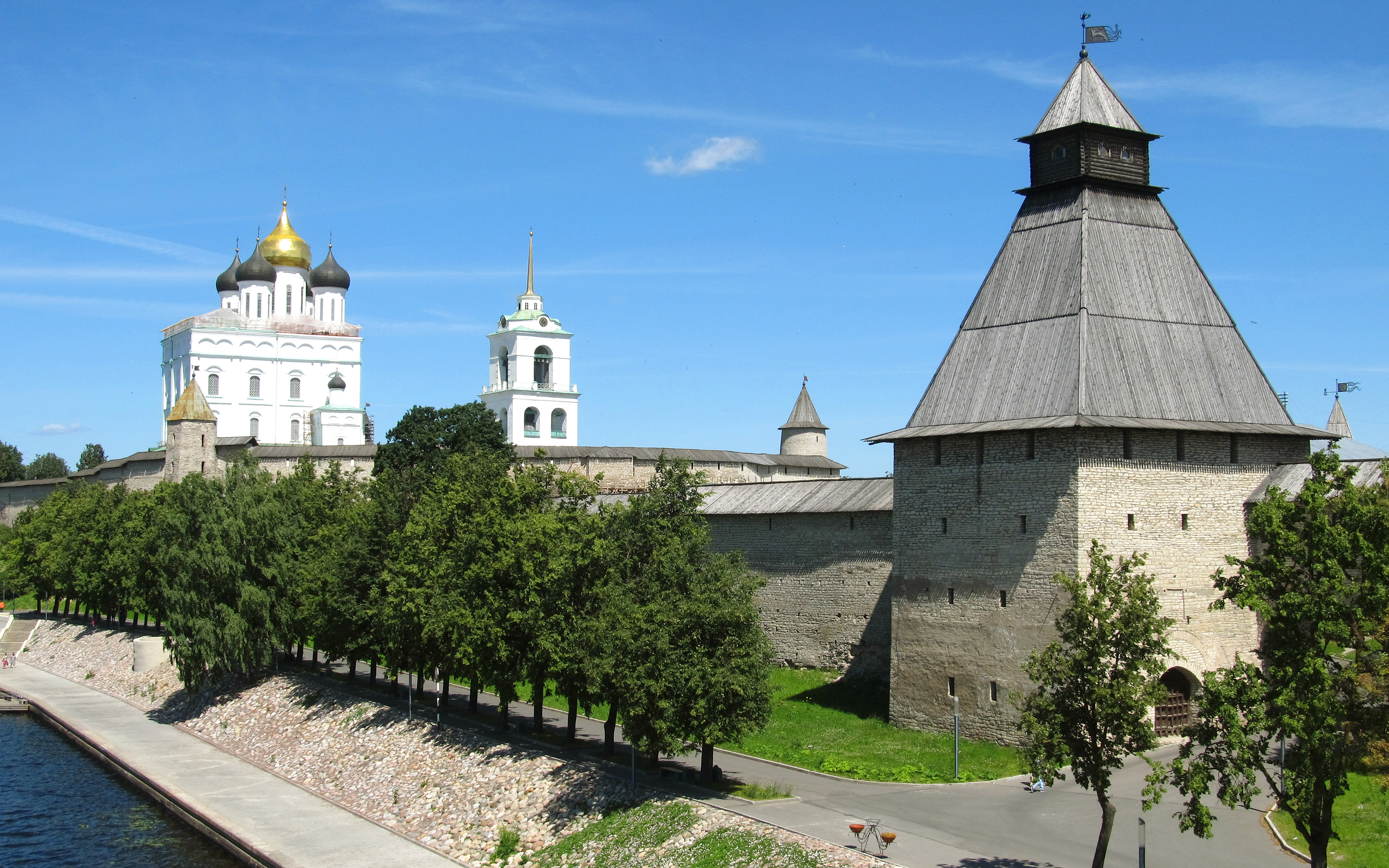
- Pskov Kremlin
Date	9 August – 27 October 1615
Location	Pskov, Tsardom of Russia
Result	Russian victory

Belligerents
Swedish Empire	Tsardom of Russia

Commanders and leaders
Gustavus Adolphus; Evert Horn †	

Strength
9,317	2,200–4,000

Casualties and losses
Heavy	Heavy

The siege of Pskov between 9 August and 27 October 1615 was the final battle of the Ingrian War with which the hostilities ended. Swedish forces under Gustav II Adolf laid siege to Pskov, but were unable to take the city.

== Prelude ==
After the Battle of Klushino, the Swedish troops, located in Russia, called in 1609 by Vasily Shuisky, declared war on Russia and in 1611 occupied Novgorod Land. The siege of Tikhvin in 1613 was unsuccessful for the Swedes, but in 1614 they managed to take Gdov. In 1615 the Swedish King Gustavus Adolphus intended to subdue the Pskov land.

== Siege ==
Approaching Pskov, the Swedes tried to take it immediately, but were repelled by the Pskov garrison with heavy losses. In front of the king, famed field marshal Evert Horn was shot dead from the wall.

On 22 August, the city was fully encircled and cut off.

During the siege, the Swedes shelled the city with artillery, but at night Pskovites successfully closed any breach in the walls, and repeatedly made bold sallies causing the Swedes considerable losses. In September, Pskov even received reinforcements from Moscow.

In early October, the Swedes undertook a second decisive assault. The attackers managed to occupy part of the city wall and one of the towers. However, the Pskovites managed to blow up the tower, together with the Swedes that were in it, and went into a fierce counterattack.

After two and a half months, the Swedes withdrew from Pskov to Narva in view of the coming cold weather, as well as the high mortality from diseases and famine.

== Aftermath ==
After a cruel defeat, King Gustavus Adolphus decided not to continue the war with Russia. Sweden already then planned to resume the struggle with Polish-Lithuanian Commonwealth for the Baltic states and was not ready for a war on two fronts. On December 15, 1615, a truce was concluded, and both parties initiated peace negotiations that ended with Treaty of Stolbovo in 1617.

The obsolete nature of Gustavus Adolphus' army was made apparent following the siege, prompting its reorganization after its return to Sweden.

== Sources ==
=== Bibliography ===
- Essen, Michael Fredholm von (2024). Sweden's War in Muscovy, 1609-1617. Warwick: Helion & Company. ISBN 9781804510087.
- Generalstaben (1936). Jung, Helge (ed.). Danska och Ryska krigen [Danish and Russian wars]. Sveriges krig 1611-1632. Vol. 1. Stockholm: V. Petterson. OCLC 873580936.
