= Siege of Gdov =

- Part of the Ingrian War
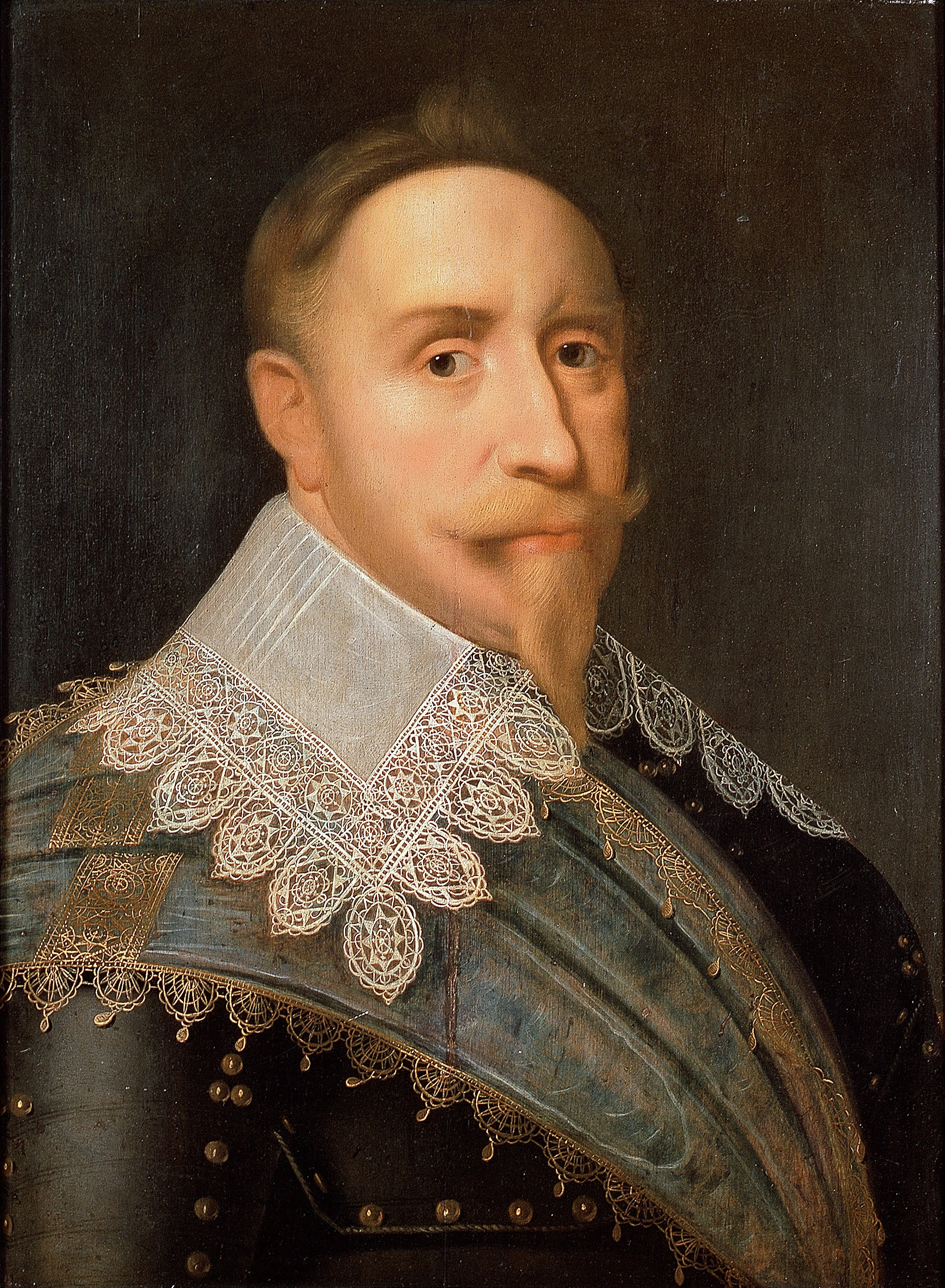
- Gustavus Adolphus
Date	August 1614
Location	Gdov, Russia
Result	Swedish victory
Territorial changes	Gdov is captured by the Swedes

Belligerents
(yes) Swedish Empire	Tsardom of Russia

Commanders and leaders
(Swedish Empire) Gustavus Adolphus (Swedish Empire) Evert Horn	(Tsardom of Russia) Local nobles

Units involved
Unknown	(Tsardom of Russia) Gdov garrison

Strength
Several thousand mercenaries	Few hundred militia

Casualties and losses
Heavy	Heavy

The siege of Gdov was part of the Time of Troubles and an episode of the Ingrian War.

== Prelude ==
In 1613, the Swedes, who captured Novgorod, approached Gdov (Augdow) twice, but as a result of the sorties of the garrison and with the help of the Pskov, the siege was withdrawn. In July 1614, the Swedes managed to defeat the Russian army sent for the liberation of Novgorod in the Battle of Bronnitsy, after which they firmly captured the military initiative in the north-west of Russia.

== Siege ==
In August 1614, the main Swedish forces led by Evert Horn were concentrated at Gdov. On August 25, King Gustavus Adolphus also arrived. The defenders of Gdov managed to repel two attacks, in which the Swedes suffered serious losses. However, the situation of the besieged became increasingly critical. Swedish artillery and subversive mines systematically destroyed the fortress wall. When more than a quarter of it was destroyed, the garrison decided to agree to the surrender of the city with free departure to Pskov, where it subsequently took part in repulsing the Swedish siege.
