= Siege of Tikhvin =

1613 siege

- Part of the Ingrian War
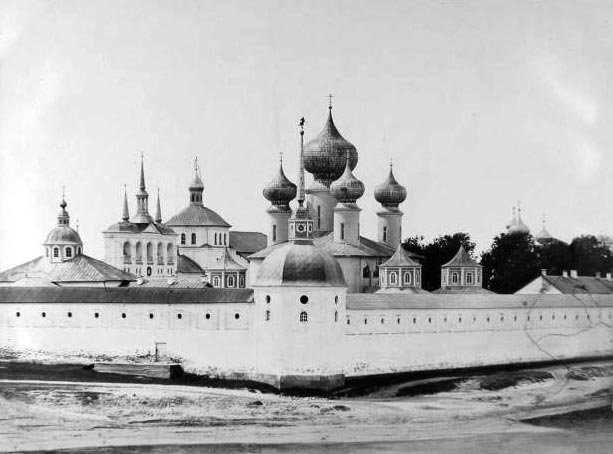
- Fortress of Tikhvin Monastery
Date	4 June – 25 September 1613
Location	Tikhvin, Russia
Result	Russian victory

Belligerents
Swedish Empire	Tsardom of Russia

Commanders and leaders
(Swedish Empire) Jacob De la Gardie	(Tsardom of Russia) Semyon Prozorovsky

Units involved
Unknown	(Tsardom of Russia) Tikhvin garrison

Strength
6,500	1,000

Casualties and losses
Heavy	Heavy

The siege of Tikhvin was a part of the Ingrian War and the Time of Troubles.

== Prelude ==
After the Battle of Klushino, Swedish troops, who had been summoned to Russia in 1609 by Vasily Shuisky, declared war on Russia and in 1611 occupied Novgorod and Tikhvin.

On June 4, 1613, local Streltsy and noblemen rose up against the Swedish garrison and destroyed it. Upon learning of this, the Swedes undertook a punitive expedition to Tikhvin and burned the town, but could not take the Assumption Monastery.

== Siege ==
Tikhvin was approached by a detachment of Russian troops, headed by Prince Semyon Prozorovsky. Meanwhile, the Swedes assembled a 5,000-strong army, which included German infantry, Finnish Reiters, 2,000 Lithuanian riders, as well as artillery and engineers.

However, counterattacks by the defenders of the monastery obstructed the siege works, and on September 17 the defenders repulsed the first general assault. In the Swedish camp riots began due to the late payment of salaries. On September 23, the Swedes, who learned of the acute shortage of gunpowder and lead in the fortress, made a second assault. Even women and children participated in the defense. Again the Swedes were beaten off, after which the defenders counterattacked and forced the enemy to retreat, leaving behind their siegeworks and equipment.

== Aftermath ==
Prince Semyon Prozorovsky later became a benefactor of the monastery and in old age took monastic vows there.
