= Veckholm Church =

Coordinates: 59°31′17″N 17°19′24″E

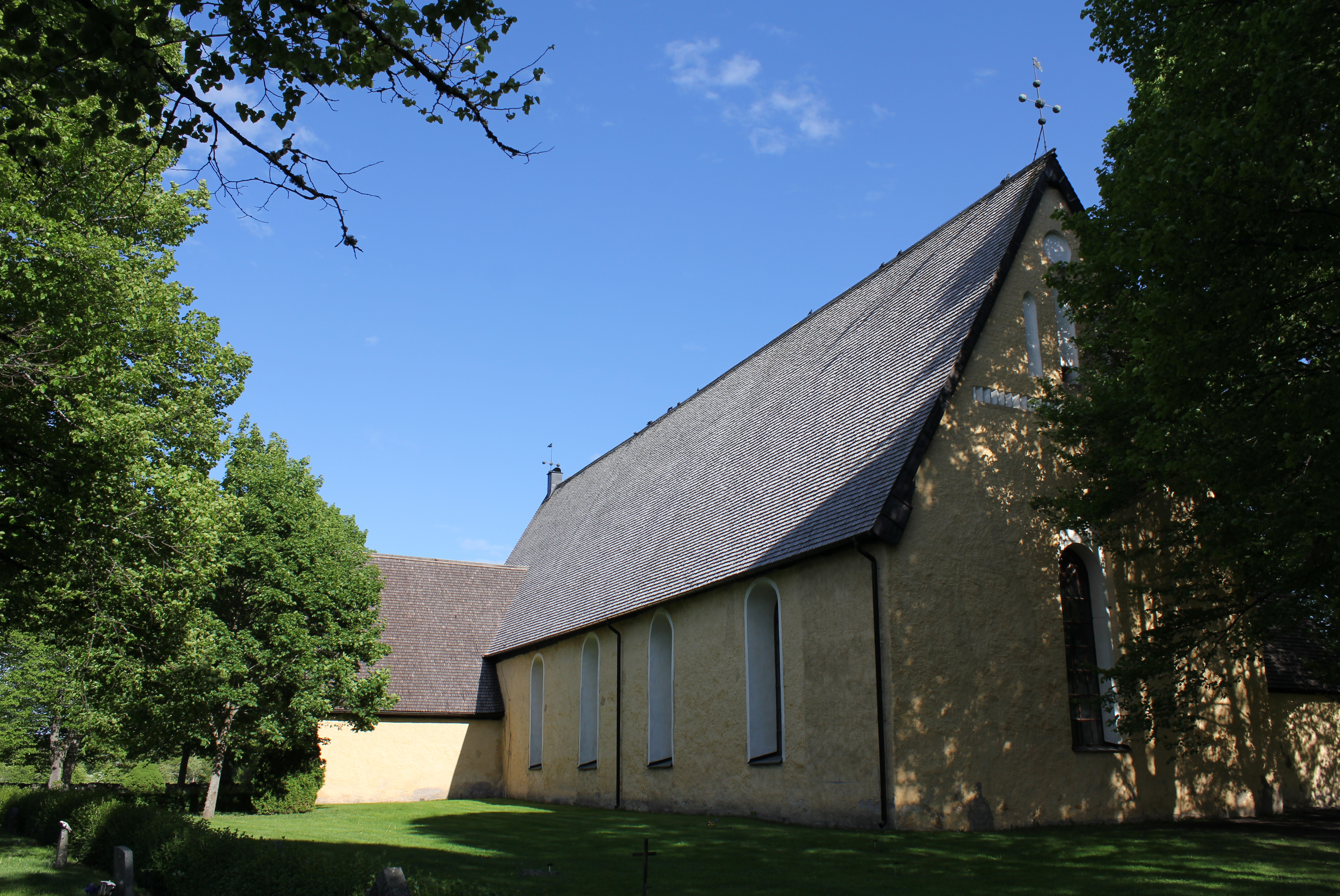
Veckholm Church, external view

Veckholm Church (Swedish: Veckholms kyrka) is a Lutheran church in the Archdiocese of Uppsala in Uppsala County, Sweden.

== History and architecture ==
The oldest parts of the church date from the 13th century. It was later enlarged, and in the 15th century the church was vaulted, a church porch and a vestry was added and the church again enlarged. In the 17th century, a grandly designed burial chapel for the De la Gardie family was added to the church, designed by Nicodemus Tessin the Elder. The chapel was never entirely finished: it reached its current height in 1675 and work was then suspended. A temporary roof was not replaced with a more permanent one until the 1790s.

The church is noteworthy for its rich internal decoration. The altarpiece is made in the atelier of Jan Borman and dates from the early 16th century. The triumphal cross is from the 15th century, while the baptismal font is from the 12th century. The church also houses an unusual carved wooden bench, dating from the 16th century. The pulpit is from 1640, and the organ from the 1660s with later additions. In addition, the burial chapel houses the sculptured grave of Fredrik Pontus De la Gardie and a large monument over Johan De la Gardie and his wife Catharina Oxenstierna.

== Gallery ==
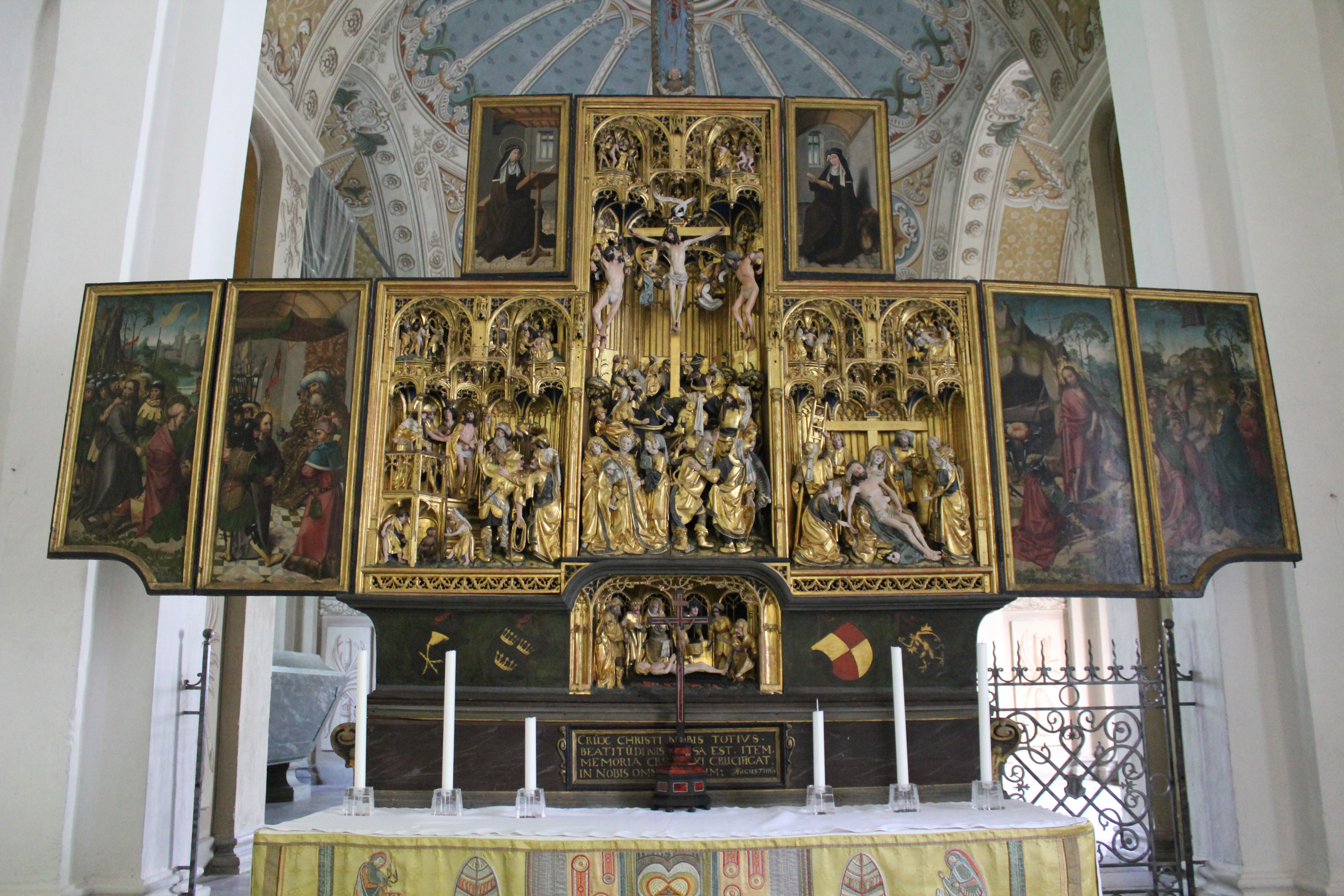
The altarpiece, made in the atelier of Jan Borman, early 16th century

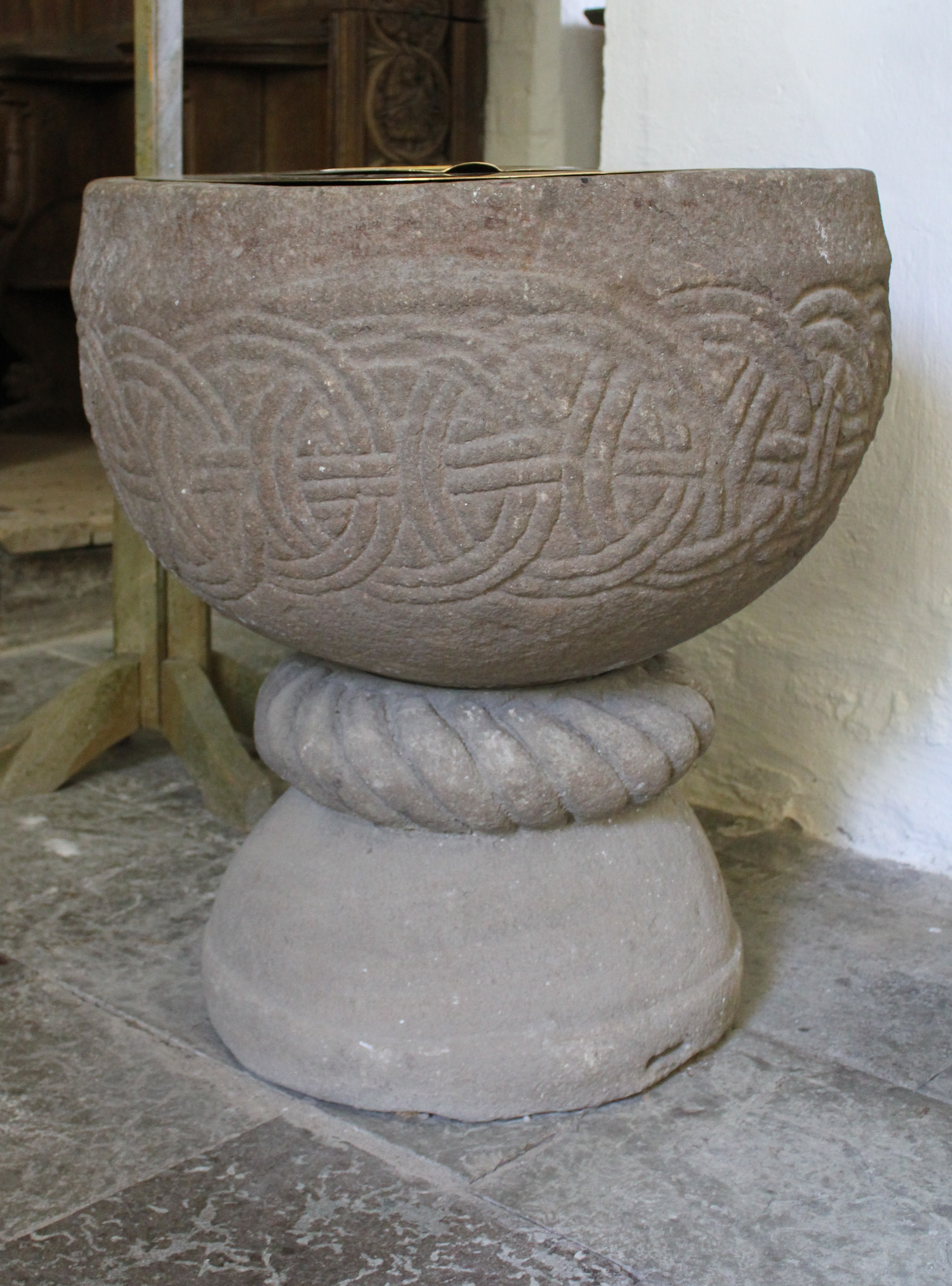
Baptismal font, 12th century

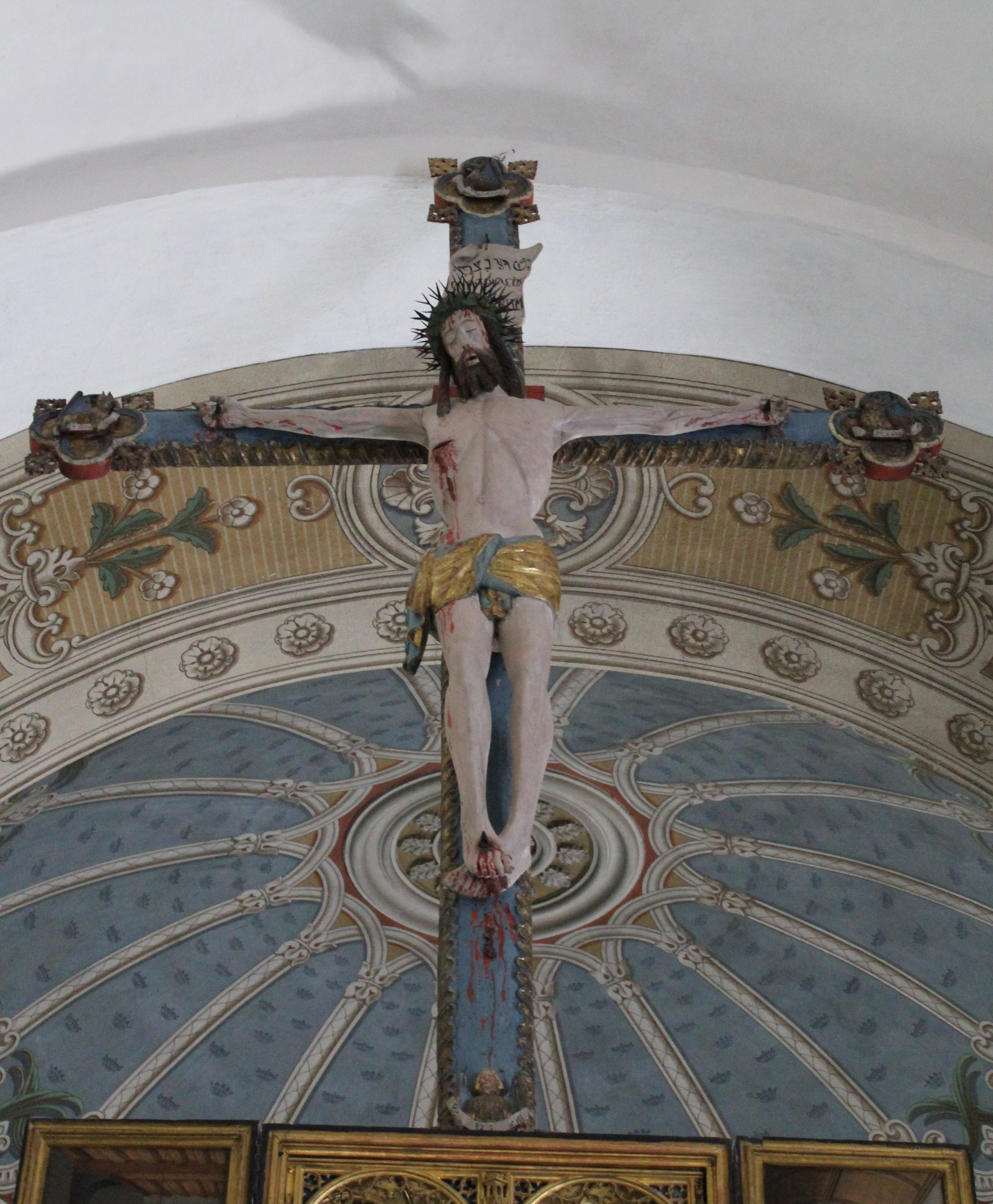
Triumphal cross, 15th century

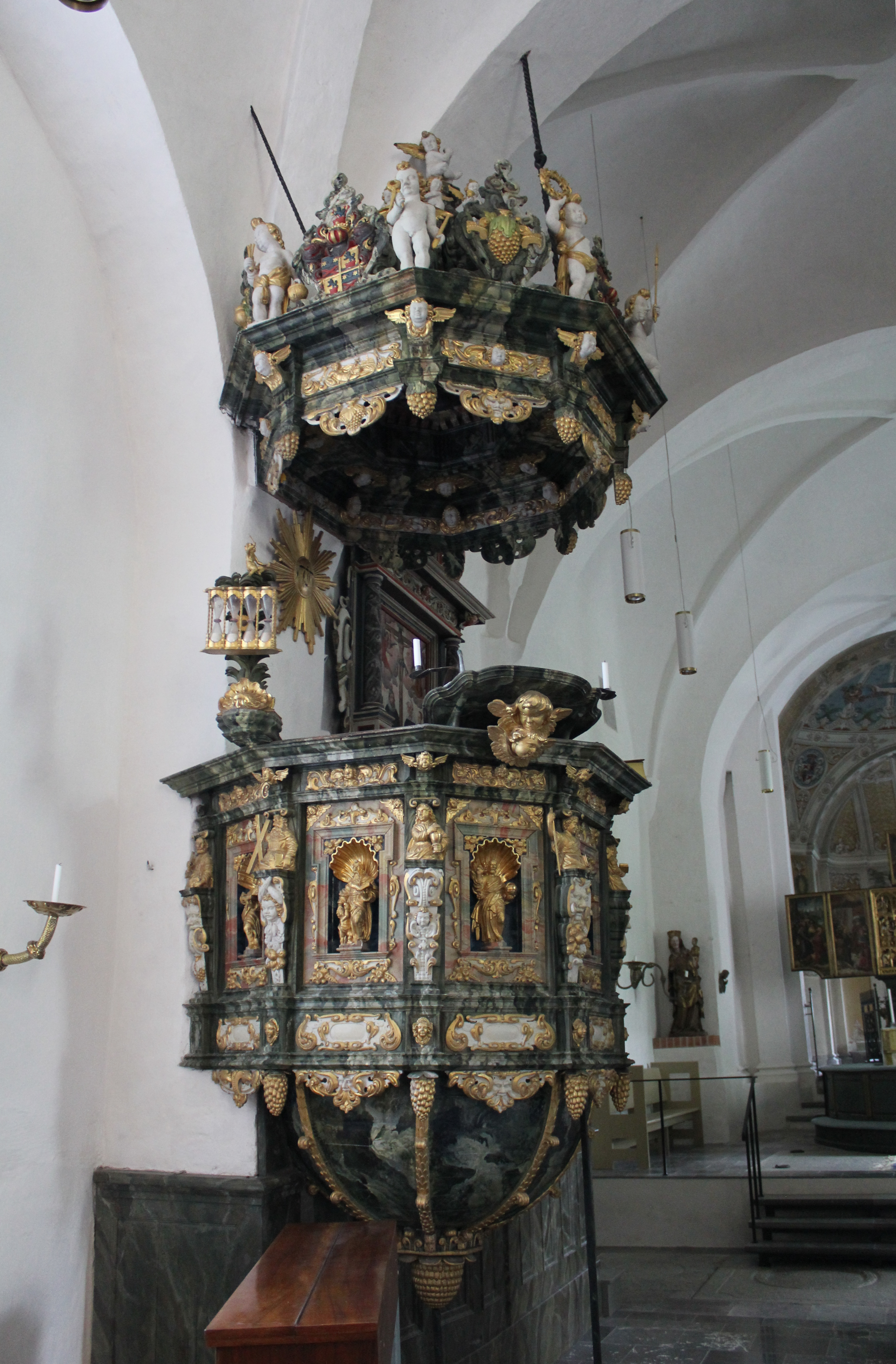
Pulpit, 1640

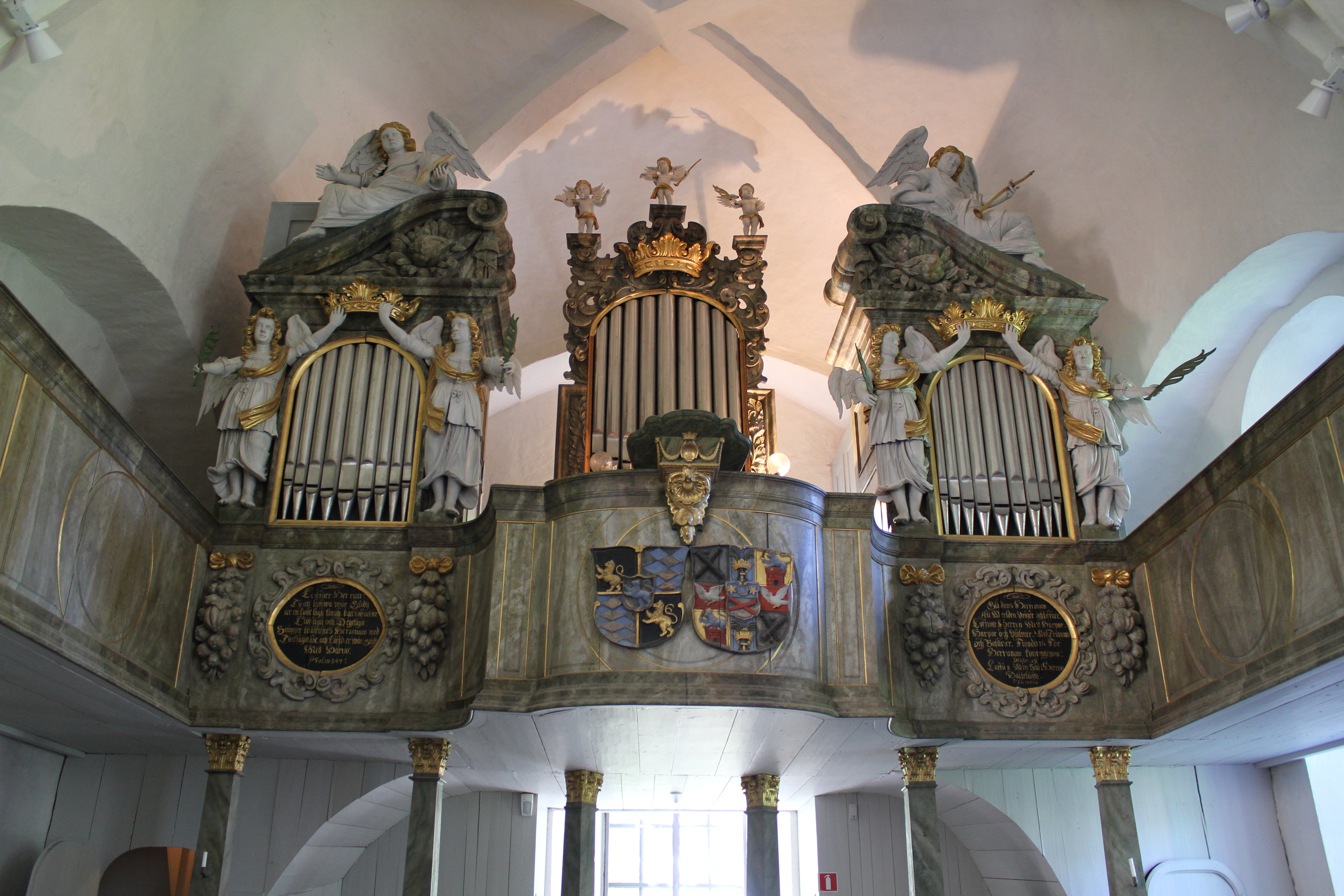
Organ, 1660s

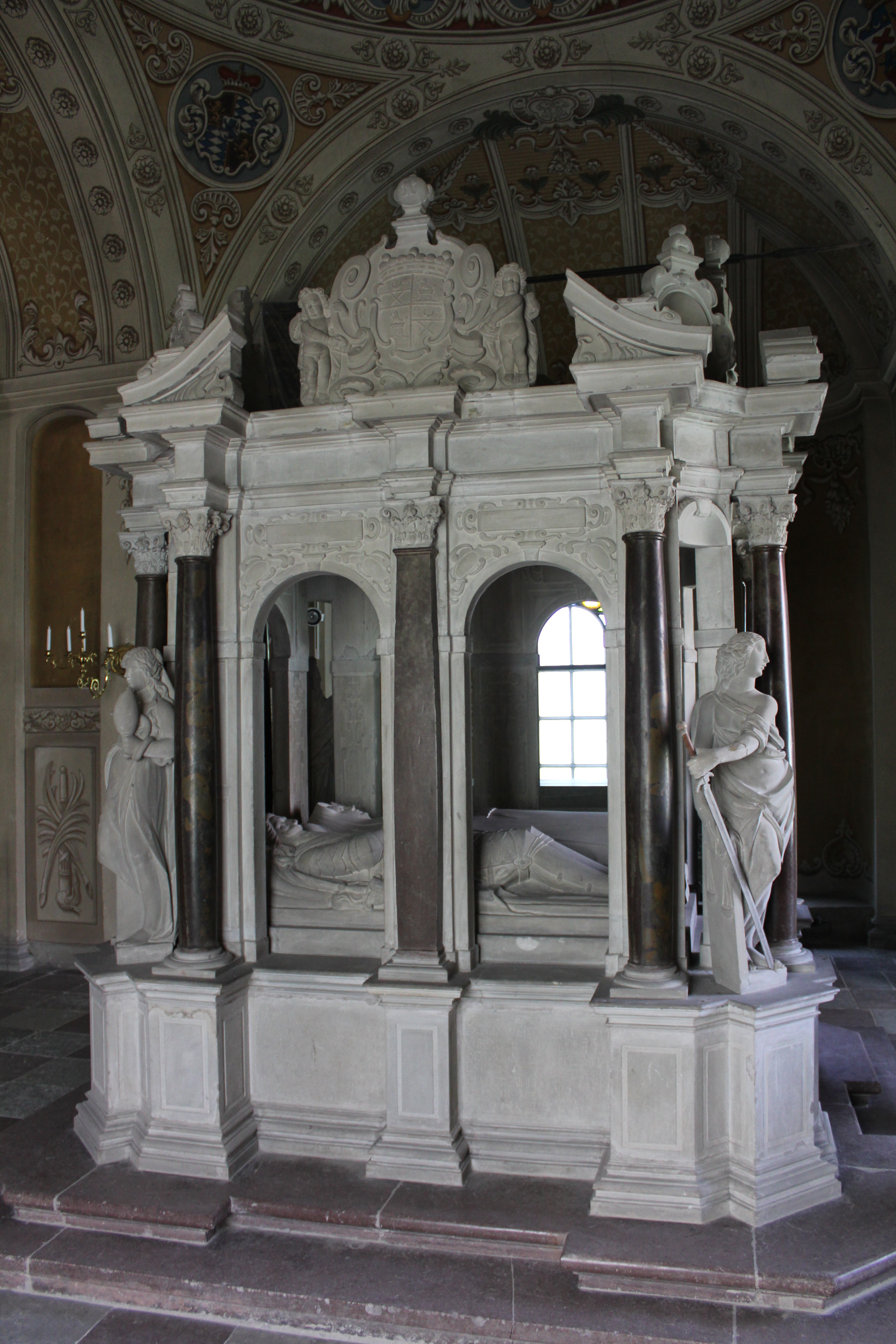
Grave monument in the grave chapel
