= De la Gardie campaign =

Russo-Swedish military campaign in 1609–1610

- Part of the Polish–Russian War (1609–1618)
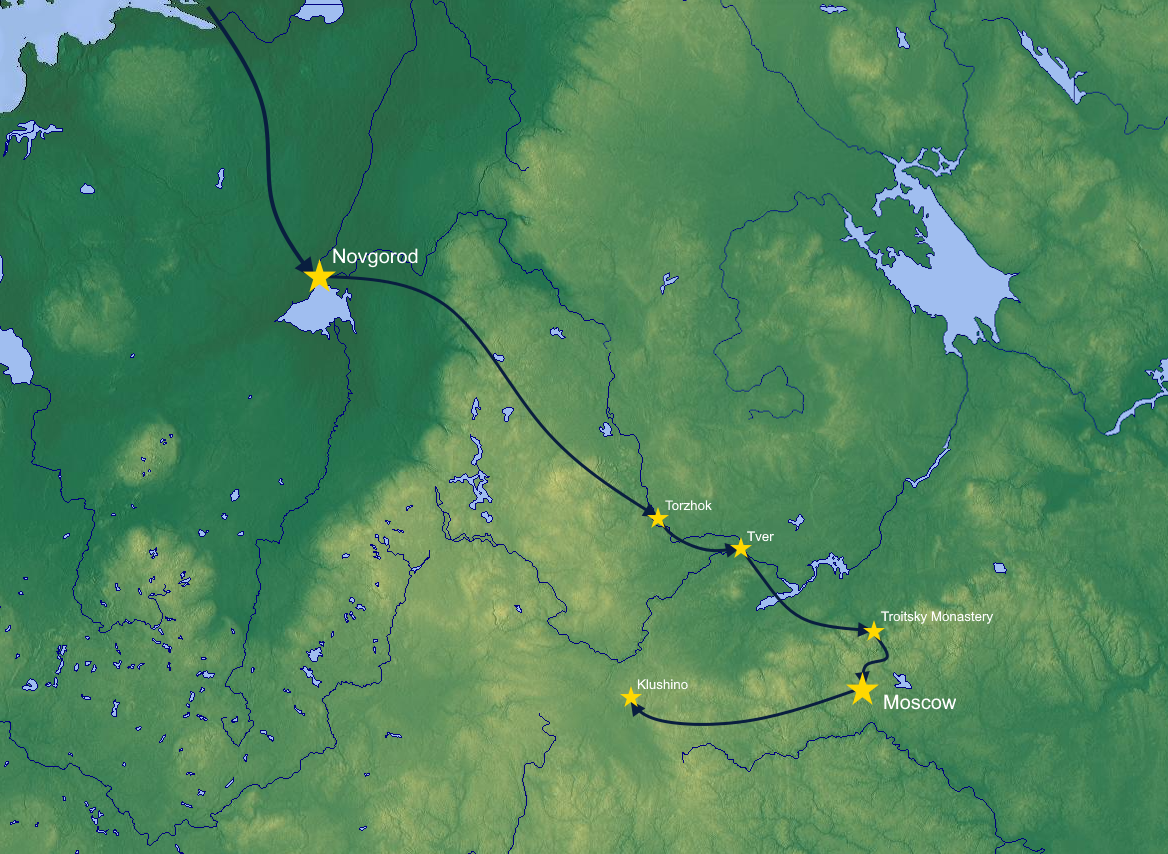
- Overview of the De la Gardie campaign
Date	April 1609 – June 4, 1610
Location	Russia
Result	Polish–Lithuanian victory

Belligerents
Tsardom of Russia; Kingdom of Sweden	False Dmitry II	Polish–Lithuanian Commonwealth

Commanders and leaders
Mikhail Skopin-Shuisky; Jacob De la Gardie; Evert Horn	Roman Rozhinsky	Stanisław Żółkiewski

Strength
5,000 Swedish; 1,500–3,000 Russians	100,000 at peak	6,500 cavalry 200 infantry 2 cannons

Casualties and losses
Heavy casualties	Heavy casualties	400

The De la Gardie campaign was a joint military campaign by Russia and Sweden during the Polish–Russian War, which lasted from April 1609 to June 1610.

Russia was unofficially occupied during the early Time of Troubles by the Polish–Lithuanian Commonwealth, which had supported False Dmitry II as the tsar of Russia since 1607. Tsar Vasili IV formed a military alliance with Sweden in 1609, providing a 5,000-strong auxiliary corps commanded by Jacob De la Gardie and Evert Horn to support Russian forces under Mikhail Skopin-Shuisky. The De la Gardie campaign was successful against False Dmitry II, dispersing his court in Tushino – a former village and town to the north of Moscow, but failed against the Polish–Lithuanians and was defeated at the Battle of Klushino on 4 June 1610.

== Prelude ==
Russia had been experiencing the Time of Troubles (1598–1613) since the death of Tsar Feodor I in 1598, causing widespread political instability and a violent succession crisis for the title of Tsar of Russia by usurpers known as the False Dmitris. In 1605, in the prelude to the Polish–Russian War, the Polish–Lithuanian Commonwealth unofficially invaded Russia in support of False Dmitry I against the unpopular crowned tsar Boris Godunov, seeking to exploit the country's weakness for their own gain. Godunov died in June 1605 and was replaced by False Dmitry I, whose popularity among the Russian populace declined rapidly during his reign. The Polish withdrew when he was eventually murdered during an uprising in Moscow in May 1606.

Despite this, Russia's instability continued to the near-total breakdown of order, prompting the Polish to invade again in 1607 to support the new usurper, False Dmitry II. In 1609, the Tsar of Russia at the time, Vasili IV, approached King Charles IX of Sweden to form a military alliance against False Dmitry II and the Polish occupiers. The two signed the Treaty of Viborg, in which Russia ceded Kexholm County and the strategic Korela Fortress to Sweden in exchange for military support. This Russian alliance, formed in 1609 with Sweden, the main rival of Poland, led to King Sigismund III of Poland officially declaring war on Russia in response.

== Campaign against False Dmitry II ==
In 1608–1613, De la Gardie, Sweden's Chief Commander in Finland, also commanded the Swedish war efforts in Russia. Thus, in accordance with the Swedish–Russian military alliance formed in 1609, he and Evert Horn now provided an auxiliary corps to support the Russian forces commanded by Mikhail Skopin-Shuisky.

Although officially the Swedish-Russian alliance was not ratified before July 1609, in early spring of 1609, Sweden gathered for this mission to Viborg in Finland (then part of Sweden), c. 5,000 soldiers, consisting mainly of Finns. Other sources claim it was 10,000, consisting mainly of cavalry. A Swedish offensive heading towards Moscow – via Novgorod – began from Viborg on 11 March 1609. The operation became known as the De la Gardie campaign. It was a joint military campaign by the Tsardom of Russia and Sweden during the Polish–Russian War, lasting officially from April 1609 to 4 June 1610.

A combined Russo-Swedish army of about 10,000 soldiers set out from Novgorod in April 1609 and marched towards Moscow, defeating rebel forces and relieving the Siege of Troitse-Sergiyeva Lavra on their way. The De la Gardie campaign was successful against False Dmitry II, dispersing his court in Tushino, a former village and town to the north of Moscow, where Dmitry II maintained an alternative court, challenging the authority of Vasili IV. On 12 March 1610, the Russo-Swedish army broke the rebel siege of Moscow and was welcomed into the city by Tsar Vasili. Swedish troops remained in Moscow for approximately 2 months.

== Aftermath ==
In the aftermath, some of the Tushino boyars summoned Wladyslaw IV to lay his claim to the Russian throne, while Skopin-Shuisky was poisoned at the behest of his uncle and rival, Prince Dmitry Shuisky.

In June 1610, De la Gardie and Dmitry Shuisky departed from Moscow to lift the Polish–Lithuanian Siege of Smolensk. However, the campaign failed when most of De la Gardie's forces defected to Polish Hetman Stanisław Żółkiewski at the Battle of Klushino. After the battle, with only 400 loyal men remaining, De la Gardie negotiated a truce with Żółkiewski, securing safe passage to Viborg, Finland (then part of Sweden), in exchange for a promise not to interfere in Russian affairs in favor of Tsar Vasili. The campaign is considered a prelude to the Ingrian War.

== Works cited ==
- Rosander, Lars [in Swedish] (2003). Sveriges fältmarskalkar: svenska fältherrar från Vasa till Bernadotte [Field Marshals of Sweden: Swedish generals from Vasa to Bernadotte] (in Swedish). Historiska Media. ISBN 9789189442054.
