= Ingrian War =

Conflict between Sweden and Russia (1610–17)

- Part of the Time of Troubles
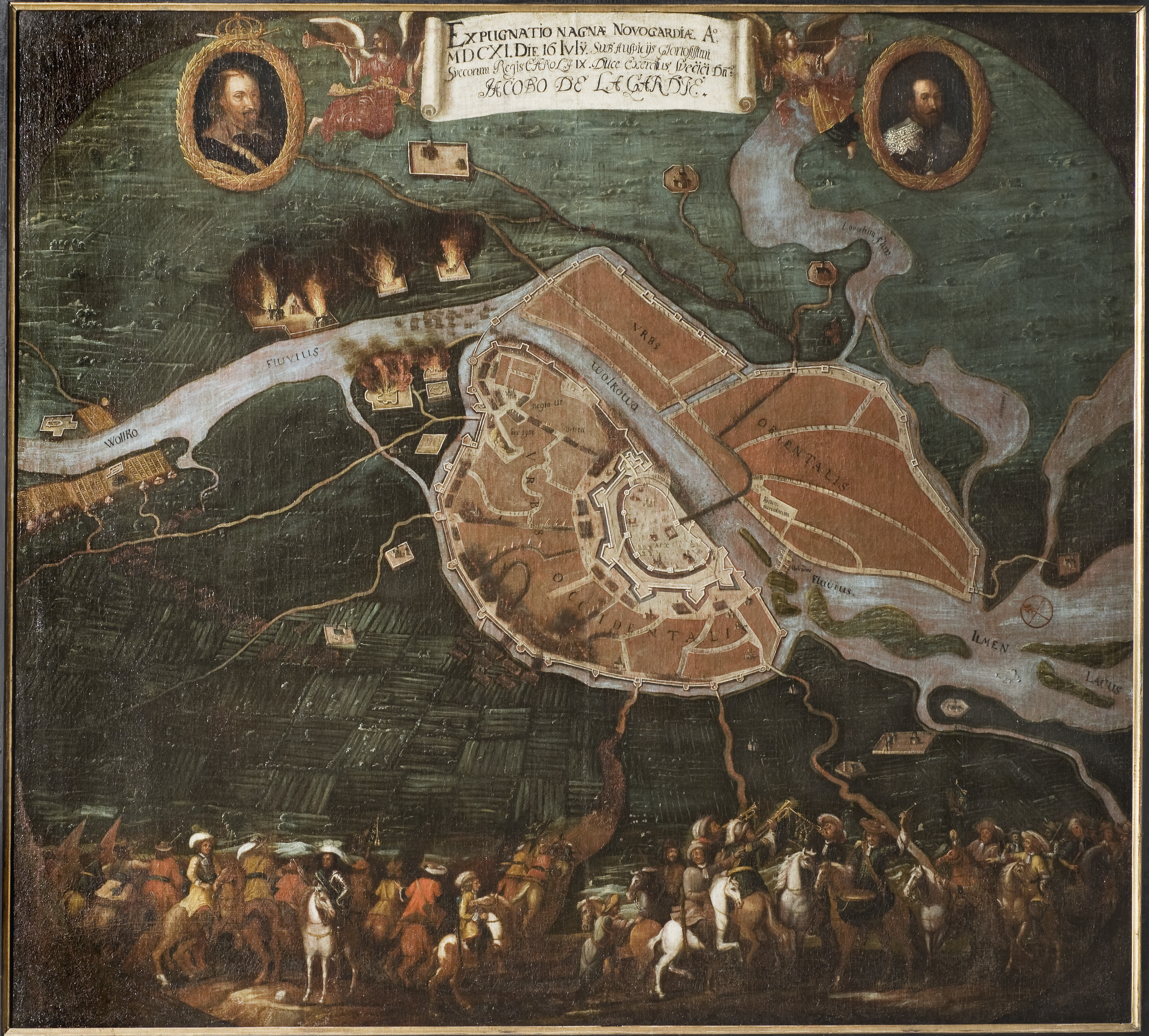
- Depiction of the Siege of Novgorod
Date	1610–1617
Location	Russia
Result	Swedish victory (See § Result)
Territorial changes	Sweden gains the province of Kexholm in Karelia and the province of Ingria — including the fortress of Nöteborg (now Shlisselburg, Russia).; Russia renounces all claims to Estonia and Livonia

Belligerents
Tsardom of Russia	(yes) Swedish Empire

Commanders and leaders
Unknown	(Swedish Empire) Gustavus Adolphus (Swedish Empire) Jacob De la Gardie (Swedish Empire) Evert Horn †

The Ingrian War (Swedish: Ingermanländska kriget) was a conflict fought between the Swedish Empire and the Tsardom of Russia which lasted between 1610 and 1617. It can be seen as part of Russia's Time of Troubles, and is mainly remembered for the attempt to put a Swedish duke on the Russian throne. It ended with a large Swedish territorial gain (including Ingria) in the Treaty of Stolbovo, which laid an important foundation to Sweden's Age of Greatness.

== Prelude ==
During Russia's Time of Troubles, Vasily IV of Russia was besieged in Moscow by the supporters of the False Dmitry II. Driven to despair by the Polish intervention, he entered into an alliance with Charles IX of Sweden, who was also waging war against Poland. According to the Treaty of Vyborg of 1609, the tsar promised to cede Korela Fortress to Sweden in recompense for military support against False Dmitry II and the Poles. Russia also renounced all territorial claims on the coast of the Baltic Sea coast. The Swedish commander Jacob De la Gardie joined his forces with the Russian commander Mikhail Skopin-Shuisky and marched from Novgorod towards Moscow in order to relieve the tsar. In May, the De la Gardie campaign began, where the Swedish corps fought as part of the army of Skopin-Shuisky, who managed to clear a significant part of Russia from the interventionists.

Sweden's involvement in Russian affairs gave King Sigismund III Vasa of Poland a pretext to declare war on Russia. After the sudden death of Skopin-Shuisky, De la Gardie's troops were united with Shuisky's army, and the Poles defeated the combined Russo-Swedish force at the Battle of Klushino on 4 July [O.S. 24 June] 1610. The Swedish mercenaries taking part in the De la Gardie Campaign surrendered and De la Gardie concluded an agreement with Polish hetman Stanisław Żółkiewski. The battle had serious consequences for Russia, as the tsar was deposed by the Seven Boyars and the Poles occupied the Moscow Kremlin, after which the Russian state began to fall into its constituent parts. De la Gardie then sought to take control of the Russian north-west in order to prevent the Poles from extending their power and therefore threaten Sweden with an offensive on its Baltic territories.

== War ==
In July 1611, a Swedish expeditionary corps under Jacob De la Gardie captured Novgorod. He compelled the Novgorodians to acknowledge the Swedish king as their patron and forced them to choose one of his sons, Carl Filip or Gustavus Adolphus, to be installed as their monarch.

Meanwhile, Gustavus Adolphus ascended to the Swedish throne. The young king decided to pursue his brother's claim to the Russian throne, even after the Poles had been expelled from Moscow by a patriotic uprising in 1612, which resulted in Mikhail Romanov being elected as the new tsar. He became the first tsar of the House of Romanov.

While Swedish statesmen envisioned the creation of a Trans-Baltic dominion extending northward to Arkhangelsk and eastward to Vologda, De la Gardie and other Swedish soldiers, still holding Novgorod and Ingria, viewed the war as a response to their forces not receiving payment for their support during the De la Gardie Campaign.

In 1613, Swedish troops advanced towards Tikhvin and laid siege to the city but were ultimately repelled. The Russian counteroffensive failed to reclaim Novgorod; however, the Russian tsar refused to commit his troops to battle, and the war dragged on until 1614 when the Swedes captured Gdov. The Swedes transferred about 5,000 soldiers who had participated in the Swedish-Danish war, which concluded with the peace in Knäred that same year. In 1614, an additional 7,000 soldiers were also shipped over.

The following year, Gustavus Adolphus laid siege to Pskov, but Russian Generals Morozov and Buturlin successfully defended the city. Sweden and Russia began negotiations on 9 March [O.S. 27 February] 1617, which ultimately resulted in the end of the war with the Treaty of Stolbovo.

== Result ==
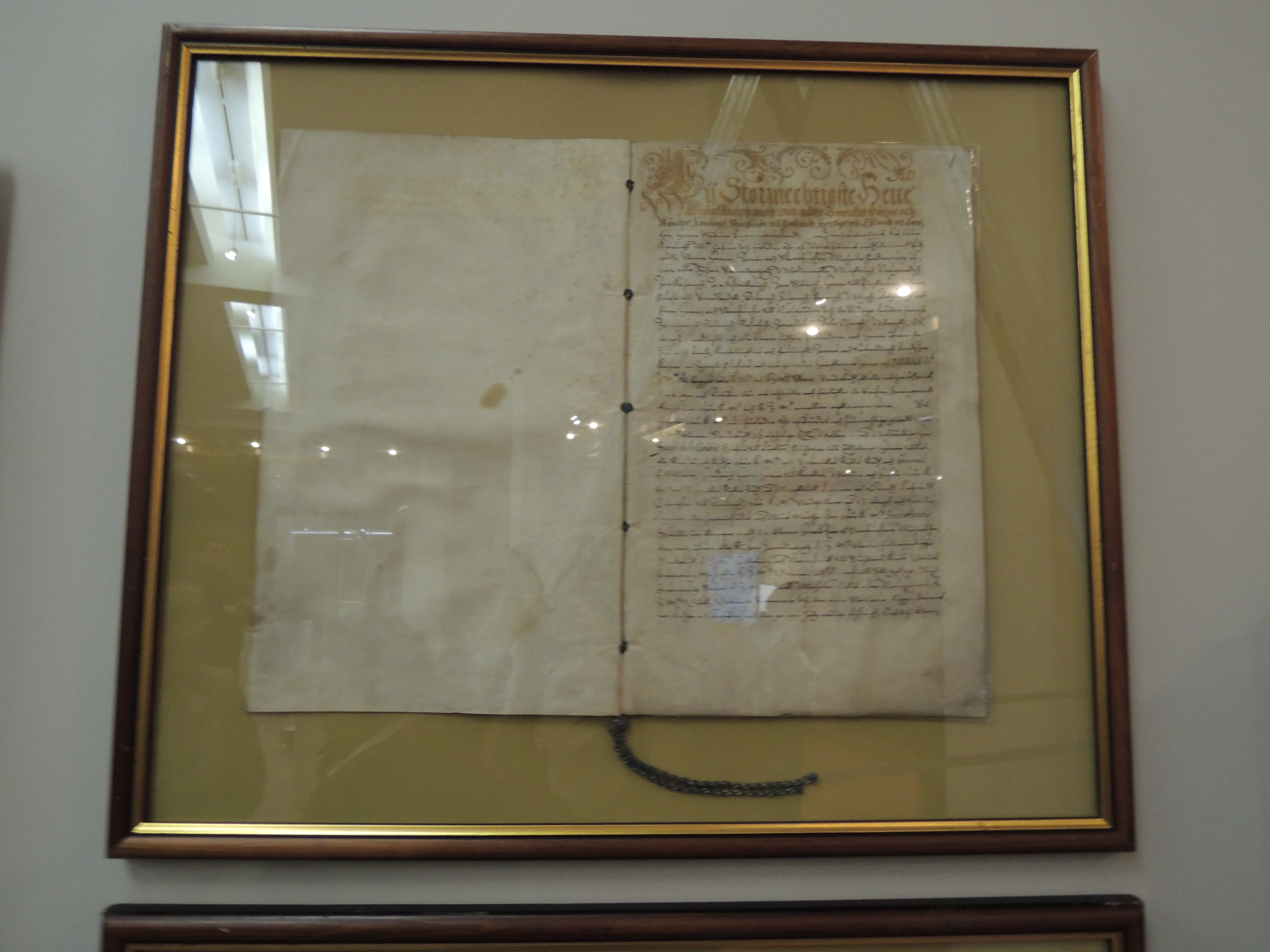
Treaty of Stolbovo at the 2013 exhibition "Romanovs. The beginning of the dynasty"

In 1617, the Treaty of Stolbovo was concluded between Russia and Sweden in which the Swedes acquired significant territories in Ingria, with the townships of Ivangorod, Jama, Koporye, and Nöteborg, as well as Kexholm in Karelia, but restored Novgorod and Gdov which they had occupied since 1611 and 1614, respectively. As a result, Russia was denied access to the Baltic Sea for about a century, despite its persistent efforts to reverse the situation. This led to the increased importance of Arkhangelsk for its trading connections with Western Europe. Russia also renounced all claims to Estonia and Livonia and were obligated to pay 20,000 rubles in war reparations, while Sweden recognised Michael Romanov as the rightful Russian tsar.

A majority of sources assess the war as a victory for the Swedes, with some specifying it as a Swedish military victory. The treaty was considered humiliating in the Soviet era, but more recent Russian historiography views it differently; since the treaty allowed the Russians to concentrate their forces against Poland in the concurrent war, the loss of the Baltic coast was seen as less concerning at the time. Russian historian German Zamyatin claims that, while the treaty was difficult for Russia, Sweden had suffered a diplomatic defeat in its failure to secure Novgorod and Gdov, while other sources express a similar point of view. Gennady Kovalenko considers the agreement a mutually beneficial compromise. The Russian tsar and the Swedish king were both pleased with the peace treaty, with parades being held in Moscow as part of its conclusion.

== See also ==
- Polish–Swedish War (1617–1618)
