= Treaty of Stolbovo =

1617 peace treaty between Sweden and Russia

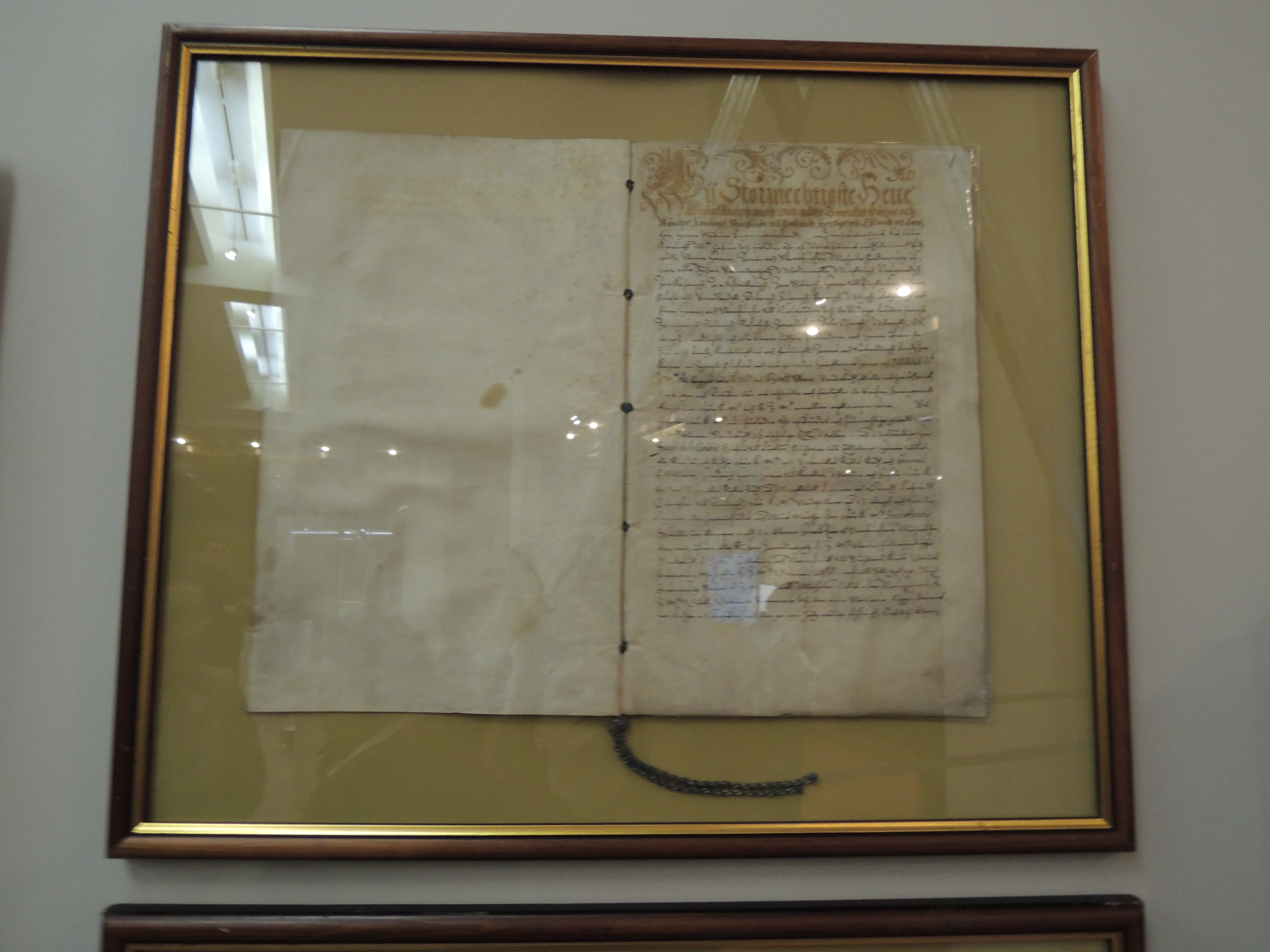
The Treaty of Stolbovo on display in the State Historical Museum, Moscow

The Treaty of Stolbovo (Russian: Столбовский мир; Swedish: Freden i Stolbova) was a peace treaty that ended the Ingrian War (Ingermanländska kriget), which had been fought between the Swedish Empire and the Russian Tsardom between 1610 and 1617.

== History ==
After nearly two months of negotiations, representatives from Sweden and Russia met at the now-derelict village of Stolbovo, south of Lake Ladoga, now in Volkhovsky District. The meeting took place on 9 March [O.S. 27 February] 1617. From the outset, Sweden had gone into the negotiations with very high ambitions and hopes of fulfilling the old dream of making all Russian trade pass through Swedish territory. As a consequence of that ambition, the Swedes originally demanded far-reaching territorial gains into western Russia, including the important northern port of Arkhangelsk.

However, King James I of England sent a delegation to mediate, and the United Provinces did the same, mostly to ensure that Arkhangelsk did not fall into Swedish hands, which would have made the extensive trade between Western Europe and Russia far more difficult. Arkhangelsk did not change hands in the resulting treaty, partly because of the Dutch and the English efforts but mostly because Russia finally managed to unite under Tsar Michael I of Russia. As word reached Russia that the Swedish war against Poland might soon be over, the Russians really became serious in the negotiations to avoid Sweden's renewal of the war effort on only one front.

The Kingdom of England was officially credited with brokering the peace through its mediator, John Mericke (c.1559 – 1638/9), but the Dutch efforts were also very important. After the war, the leader of the Dutch delegation, Reinoud van Brederode (1567–1633), was granted the title of baron and given the barony of Wesenberg (Rakvere) in Estonia by King Gustavus Adolphus of Sweden.

== Terms ==
In the resulting peace treaty, the Russian tsar and Swedish king agreed to the following terms:

- Sweden gained the province of Kexholm in Karelia and the province of Ingria – including the fortress of Nöteborg, (now Shlisselburg, Russia).
- Russia renounced all claims to Estonia and Livonia and would pay Sweden war indemnities of 20,000 rubles.
- Novgorod and other Swedish territorial gains during the war would be returned to Russia.
- Sweden had the right to keep all spoils of war collected before 20 November 1616.
- The city of Gdov was to remain in Swedish hands until the peace had been confirmed and the borders fully established.
- Sweden recognised Michael Romanov as the rightful Russian tsar and ended further Swedish claims in the Russian throne.
- Russia was allowed free trade at normal trade tariffs, which ensured that Sweden would not completely cripple Russia.
- Russia was allowed to establish merchant houses in Stockholm, Reval (Tallinn) and Viborg, and Sweden was allowed to establish merchant houses in Novgorod, Pskov and Moscow.

== See also ==
- The De la Gardie Campaign
- Dymitriads
- List of treaties
- Rise of Sweden as a Great Power
- Time of Troubles
