= Evert Horn =

Swedish military personnel (1585–1615)

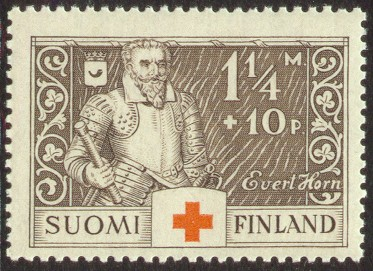
Evert Karlsson Horn af Kanckas portrayed on Finnish postage stamp (1934)

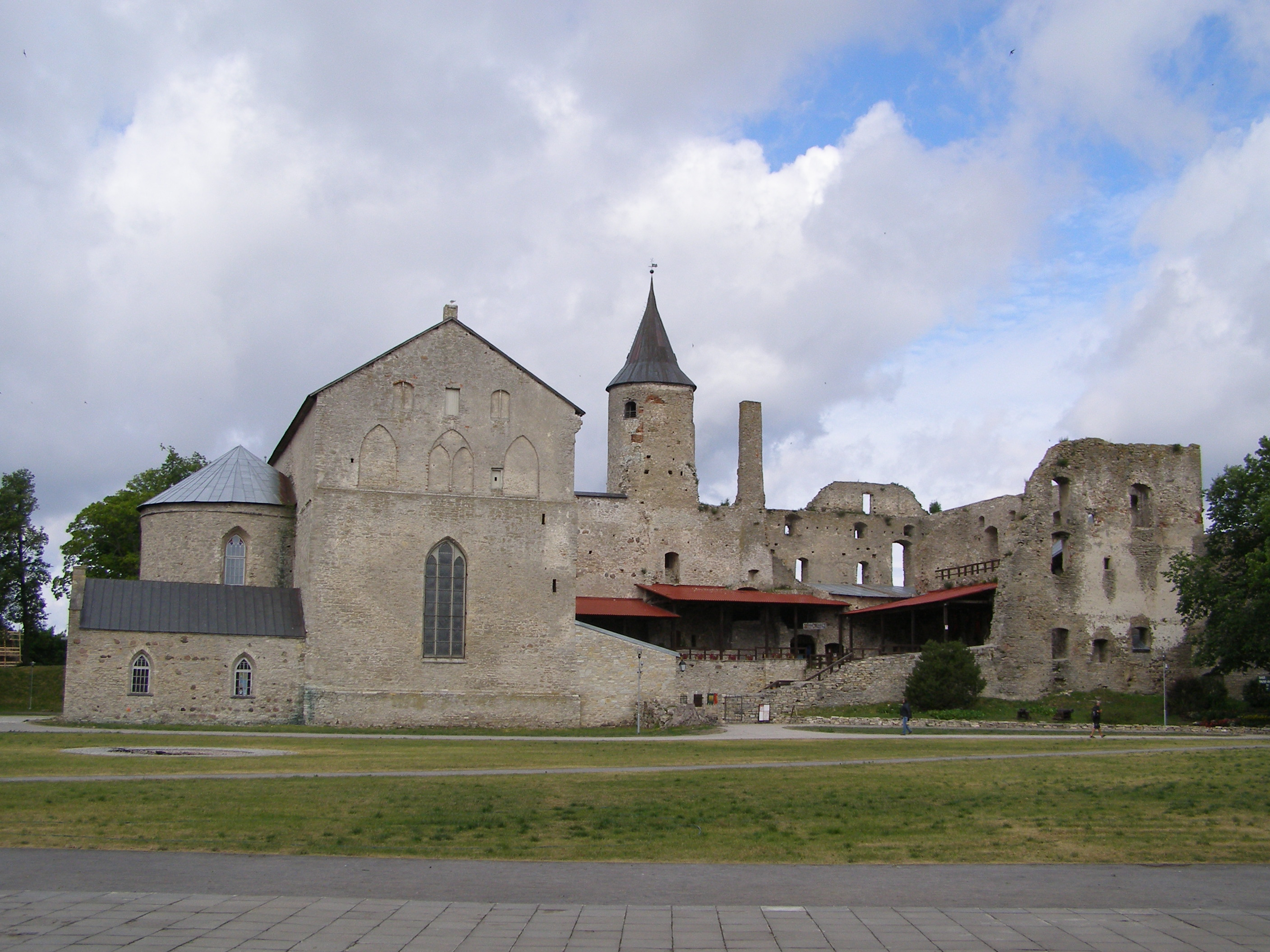
Haapsalu Castle

Evert Karlsson Horn af Kanckas (11 June 1585 – 30 July 1615) was a Swedish field marshal and governor of Narva.

== Biography ==
He was born at Haapsalu Castle in the Swedish province of Estonia. He was a son of Field Marshal Carl Horn and Agneta von Dellwig. His younger brother was Field Marshal Gustav Horn, Count of Pori (1592–1657).

In 1608, Horn was assigned to service with Jakob De la Gardie (1583–1652), Chief Commander in Finland. Evert Horn was appointed Governor (Ståthållare) of Narva in 1613 and Field Marshal in 1614.

During the Ingrian War, he was killed by a bullet during the early days of the Swedish siege of Pskov in 1615.

== Personal life ==
In 1613, he married Margareta Fincke (c. 1611–1647), daughter of Governor Gödik Fincke (c. 1546–1617) and his first wife Ingeborg Boije (c. 1550–1580).
Their son Gustav Evertsson Horn af Marienborg (1614–1666) was a member of the Privy Council of Sweden and Governor General of Finland.

== See also ==
Horn family
De la Gardie Campaign
List of Swedish field marshals
