= Jacob De la Gardie =

Swedish Field Marshal and noble (1583–1652)

Count Jacob De la Gardie
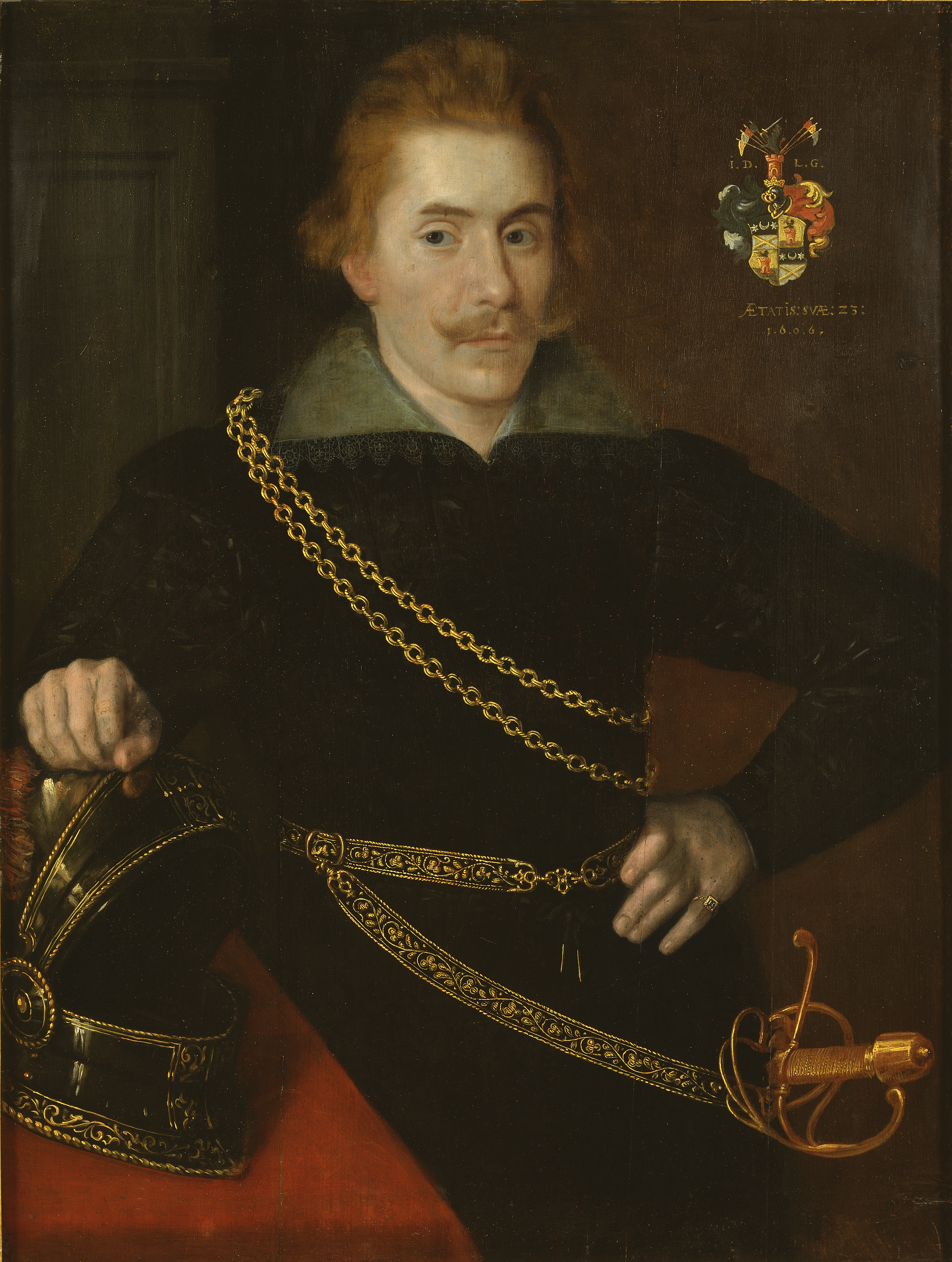
- Portrait, 1606

Lord High Constable of Sweden
- In office 1620–1652
- Preceded by: Axel Nilsson Ryning
- Succeeded by: Gustaf Horn

Governor of Swedish Estonia
- In office 1619–1622
- Preceded by: Anders Eriksson Hästehufvud
- Succeeded by: Per Gustafsson Banér

1st Governor-General of Swedish Livonia
- In office 1622–1628
- Succeeded by: Johan Skytte

Personal details
- Born: 20 June 1583 Reval, Swedish Estonia
- Died: 22 August 1652 (aged 69) Stockholm, Sweden
- Spouse: Ebba Brahe (m. 1618)
- Children: 14, including Magnus, Maria and Axel
- Parent(s): Pontus De la Gardie and Sofia Gyllenhielm

Count Jacob Pontusson De la Gardie (20 June 1583 – 22 August 1652) was a statesman and a soldier of the Swedish Empire, and a Marshal from 1620 until his death.

He was Privy Councilor from 1613 onward, Governor of Swedish Estonia from 1619 to 1622, Governor-General of Livonia from 1622 to 1628, and Lord High Constable from 1620. He introduced reforms based on the then-novel Dutch military doctrine into the Swedish army. He commanded Swedish forces in the Russian Tsardom and against the Polish–Lithuanian Commonwealth. He also served as one of the five regents jointly ruling Sweden during the minority of Queen Christina.

== Biography ==
Jacob De la Gardie was born in Reval (today Tallinn), Estonia (then part of the Swedish Empire), as a son of Pontus De la Gardie and Sofia Johansdotter Gyllenhielm, the illegitimate daughter of King John III of Sweden. His mother died giving birth, and his father perished two years later in Narva. From his age two onward, Jacob was raised in the Vääksy (Swedish: Växiö) manor, Kangasala, Finland (then part of Sweden proper) by his grandmother Karin Hansdotter, the mistress of King John III.

As a young adult, De la Gardie was held prisoner in the Polish–Lithuanian Commonwealth for four years, together with Carl Gyllenhielm. After being released, De la Gardie took part of the Dutch Revolt as a volunteer. In 1606–1608, De la Gardie served under the Dutch general Maurice of Nassau, Prince of Orange. Impressed with the Dutch way of waging war, De la Gardie began introducing Dutch methods into the Swedish army upon his return to the service of Sweden.

=== Prelude to the Jacob de La Gardie Campaign ===
The Tsardom of Russia had been experiencing the Time of Troubles (1598–1613) since the death of Tsar Feodor I in 1598, causing widespread political instability and a violent succession crisis for the title of Tsar of Russia by usurpers known as the False Dmitris. In 1605, in the prelude to the Polish–Russian War, the Polish–Lithuanian Commonwealth unofficially invaded Russia in support of False Dmitry I against the unpopular crowned tsar Boris Godunov, seeking to exploit the country's weakness for their own gain. Godunov died in June 1605 and was replaced by False Dmitry I, whose popularity among the Russian populace declined rapidly during his reign, and the Polish withdrew when he was eventually murdered during an uprising in Moscow in May 1606.

Despite this, Russia's instability continued to the near-total breakdown of order, prompting the Polish to invade again in 1607 in support of the new usurper, False Dmitry II. In 1609, the Tsar of Russia at the time, Vasili IV, approached King Charles IX of Sweden to form a military alliance against False Dmitry II and the Polish occupiers. The two signed the Treaty of Viborg (Finnish: Viipuri), in which Russia ceded Kexholm County and the strategic Korela Fortress to Sweden in exchange for military support. This Russian alliance with Sweden, the main rival of Poland, led to King Sigismund III of Poland officially declaring war on Russia in response.

=== Execution of the campaign ===
In 1608–1613, De la Gardie as Sweden's Chief Commander in Finland also commanded the Swedish war efforts in Russia. Thus, in accordance with the Swedish-Russian military alliance formed in 1609, he together with Evert Horn now took charge of providing an auxiliary corps to support the Russian forces commanded by Mikhail Skopin-Shuisky.

Although officially the Swedish-Russian alliance was not ratified before July 1609, already in the early spring of 1609 Sweden gathered for this mission to the city of Viborg in Finland (then part of Sweden) c. 5,000 soldiers, consisting mainly of Finns. A Swedish offensive heading towards Moscow – via Novgorod – began from Viborg on 11 March 1609. The operation became known as De la Gardie campaign. It was a joint military campaign by the Tsardom of Russia and Sweden during the Polish–Russian War (1609–1618), also known as the Dimitriads, lasting officially from April 1609 to 4 June 1610.

A combined Russo-Swedish army of about 10,000 soldiers set out from Novgorod in April 1609 and marched towards Moscow, defeating rebel forces and relieving the Siege of Troitse-Sergiyeva Lavra on their way. The De la Gardie campaign was successful against False Dmitry II, dispersing his court in Tushino, a former village and town to the north of Moscow, where Dmitry II maintained an alternative court, challenging the authority of Vasili IV. On 12 March 1610, the Russo-Swedish army broke the rebel siege of Moscow and conquered the city.

In June 1610, De la Gardie and Prince Dmitry Shuisky – an uncle and rival of Skopin-Shuisky (who was poisoned at the behest of his uncle) – departed from Moscow, in order to lift the Polish–Lithuanian Siege of Smolensk. The campaign ended with most of De la Gardie's forces defecting to the Polish hetman Stanisław Żółkiewski at the Battle of Klushino, causing a defeat to De la Gardie's alliance on 4 June 1610. After this, De la Gardie's remaining army returned to Viborg during that summer.

=== Ingrian War ===
Not long thereafter, the Ingrian War in 1610–1617 between Sweden and Russia was initiated, during which De la Gardie played a significant role militarily. A new army was rapidly being formed for Jacob De la Gardie, again stationed in Viborg. It this time included four foreign mercenary fighting units, in addition to Finns and Swedes (seven cavalry and two infantry units arrived from Stockholm to Turku on 25 January 1611).

De la Gardie also claimed that Sweden should take advantage of the ongoing turmoil in Russia, later known as the Times of Trouble, and try to place Charles Philip, younger brother of the Swedish King Gustavus Adolphus, on the Russian throne. After some negotiating, these plans were abandoned due to lack of engagement from Gustavus Adolphus, and due to uncertainty on the Russian side.

In 1617, De la Gardie became the chief Swedish negotiator at the Treaty of Stolbovo that ended the Ingrian War, whereby the Swedish Empire was able to secure important territorial concessions from Russia, effectively closing off Russia from access to the Baltic Sea.

From July 1619 to 1622, De la Gardie was Governor of the Swedish Estonia. In 1626, he purchased an estate with a medieval castle in Haapsalu, in modern-day Estonia. His time as governor of Estonia was followed by a time as Governor-General of Livonia in 1622–1628 (conquered by the Swedish Empire in 1621, and referred to as Swedish Livonia in 1629–1721).

After 1621, De la Gardie took part in the Polish–Swedish War (1621–1625) against his mother's half-brother, King Sigismund III of Poland (a former king of Sweden), in Livonia, but he was recalled after serving as commander in chief between 1626 and 1628. De la Gardie was an advocate of peace with Poland and acted as one of the Swedish negotiators at the Truce of Stuhmsdorf in 1635.

=== Member of the Privy Council ===
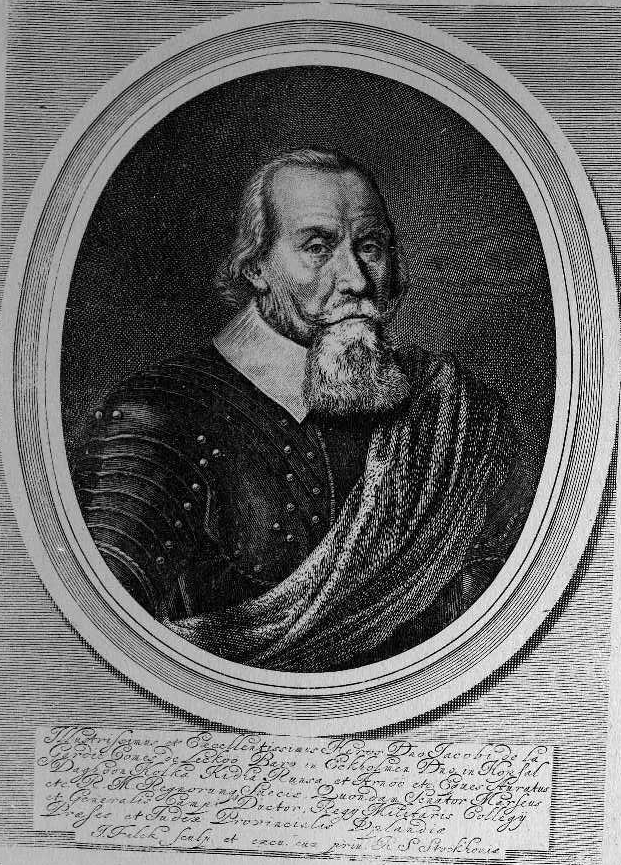
Jacob De la Gardie

De la Gardie became a member of the Swedish Privy Council in 1613. In 1620, he became Lord High Constable and, as such, he was later one of the five regents ruling Sweden during Queen Christina's minority (1632–44). His pacifist and pro-French and pro-Polish attitudes often put him at odds with Chancellor Axel Oxenstierna, who led Sweden's war effort in the Thirty Years' War after the death of Gustavus Adolphus in 1632.

As De la Gardie supported many of Oxenstierna's other policies, eventually the two leaders reconciled after Oxenstierna's return to Sweden in 1636. Although the Marshal's Office came under criticism that year, De la Gardie continued to operate effectively, making large profits from leasing royal revenues and from loans to the crown.

=== Family life ===
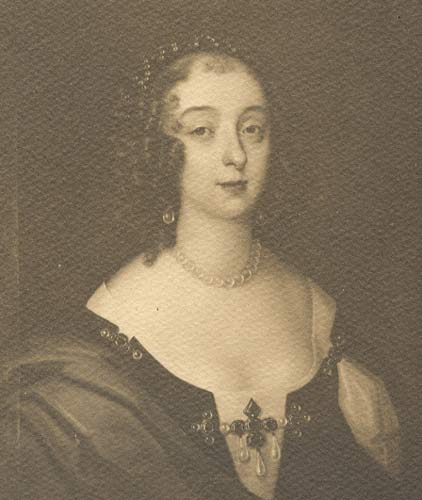
Ebba Brahe

In 1618, De la Gardie married Ebba Brahe, the love of young Gustavus Adolphus. His marriage with Ebba produced 14 children, seven of whom lived to maturity. None of her children are believed to have been fathered by King Gustavus Adolphus.

1. Pontus De la Gardie (1619–1632).
2. Christina De la Gardie (1620 – d. in infancy).
3. Sophia De la Gardie (1621 – d. in infancy).
4. Magnus Gabriel De la Gardie (1622–1686), Lord High Chancellor of the Privy Council of Sweden.
5. Brita De la Gardie (1624 – d. in infancy).
6. Gustaf Adolph De la Gardie (1626 – d. in infancy).
7. Maria Sofia De la Gardie (1627–1694); married Gustaf Gabrielsson Oxenstierna, nephew of regent Axel Oxenstierna.
8. Jakob Kasimir De la Gardie (1629–1658); married Ebba Sparre, intimate friend of Queen Christina of Sweden.
9. Pontus Frederick De la Gardie (1630–1692).
10. Christina Catharine De la Gardie (1632–1704); married Gustaf Otto Stenbock, mother of Magnus Stenbock.
11. Johann Karl De la Gardie (1634 – d. in infancy).
12. Birgitta Helena De la Gardie (1636 – d. in infancy).
13. Axel Julius De la Gardie (1637–1710), Field Marshal and Governor-General over Estonia.
14. Ebba Margaretha De La Gardie (1638–1696).

=== Death and legacy ===
The coat of arms of Jakobstad, a town named after De la Gardie.

Count Jacob De la Gardie died in Stockholm in 1652 and is buried in the Veckholm Church in Uppsala County, Sweden. The town of Jakobstad in Finland is named after him. A shopping mall in Old Tallinn is named De la Gardie in honor of him. During the Ingrian War, the Finnish soldiers nicknamed their commander Laiska-Jaakko ("Lazy Jacob"), due to the unusually lengthy six-year occupation of Novgorod. This name is still widely remembered in Finland. The siege was thus recorded in a folk verse: Lähti suvi, lähti talvi, vaan ei lähde Laiska-Jaakko. ("The summer left, the winter left, but Lazy Jacob does not leave.")
