= Zemsky Sobor of 1613 =

Establishment of Mikhail Romanov as Tsar of Russia

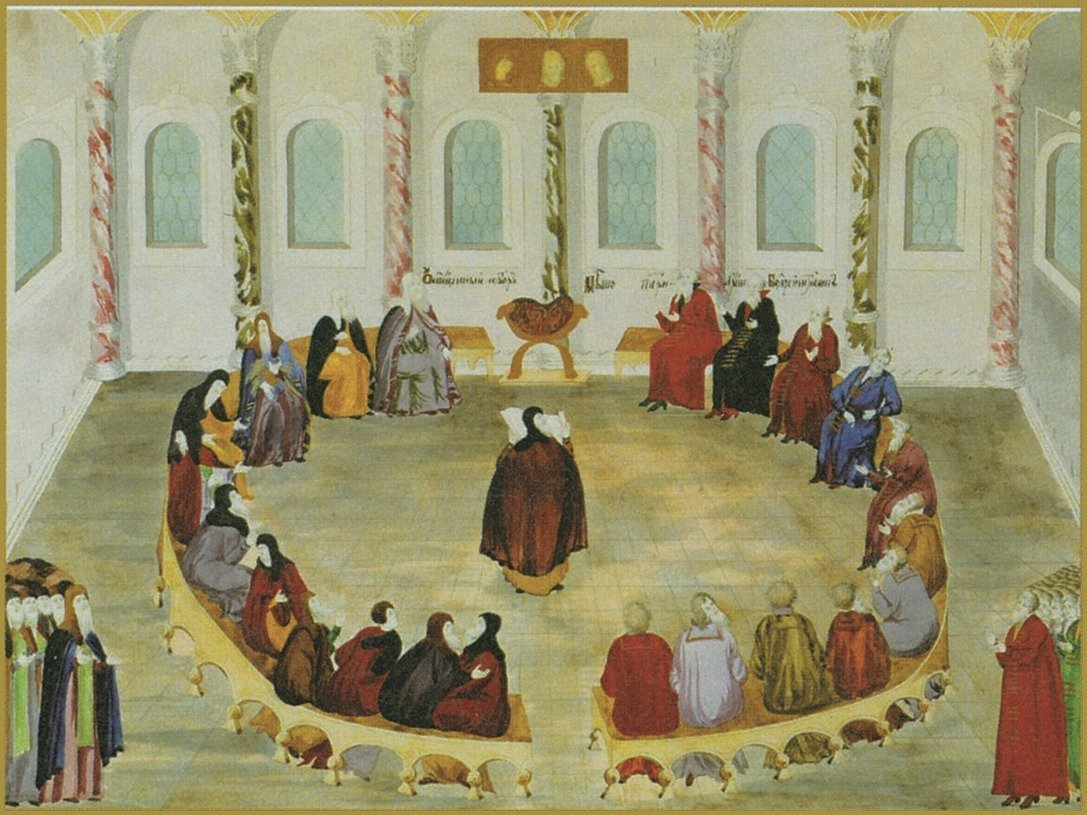
The proclamation by Abraham Palitsin, kelar of the Trinity-Sergius Monastery, the decision of the Zemsky Sobor on the election of Mikhail Fedorovich Romanov to the kingdom. A miniature from the Book of the Election to the Kingdom of the Great Russian Tsar of the Great Sovereign and Grand Prince Prince Mikhail Feodorovich of All Great Russian Autocracy. 1673

The Zemsky Sobor of 1613 was a meeting of representatives of the Estates of the realm of the Tsardom of Russia, held for the election of Tsar after the expulsion of the Polish-Lithuanian Occupiers at the end of the Time of Troubles. It was opened on 16 January 1613 in the Assumption Cathedral of the Moscow Kremlin. On 3 March 1613, the Sobor elected Mikhail Romanov as Tsar, establishing the House of Romanov as the new ruling Russian dynasty. The coronation of Michael I is widely considered to be the end of the time of troubles.

== Zemsky Sobors ==
57 Zemsky Sobors were convened in Russia repeatedly over the course of a century and a half – from 1549 when the first Sobor of conciliation was held by Ivan the Terrible to 1684 when they were abolished by Peter I). However, in all other cases, they played the role of an advisory body under the current monarch and, in fact, did not limit its absolute power. The Zemsky Sobor of 1613 was convened in a dynastic crisis. Its main task was to elect and legitimize the new dynasty on the Russian throne.

== Background ==
The dynastic crisis in Russia erupted in 1598 after the death of Tsar Feodor I of Russia. At the time of his death, Feodor remained the only son of Tsar Ivan the Terrible. Two other sons were killed: the eldest, Ivan Ioannovich, died in 1581, allegedly at the hands of his father; the youngest, Dmitry Ioannovich, in 1591 in Uglich under suspicious circumstances. Fedor died childless, and as such after his death, the throne passed to the king's wife, Irina(although this was disputed), then to her brother Boris Godunov. After the death of Boris in 1605, the throne passed to:

- The son of Boris, Fedor Godunov;
- False Dmitry I, an imposter claiming to be Dmitry of Uglich
- Vasily Shuisky, who overthrew the above

After the overthrow of Vasily Shuisky from the throne as a result of the 27 July 1610 uprising, power in Moscow passed to the Seven Boyars (Semiboyarschina), who were an interim government made from Boyars and princes. In August 1610, part of the population of Moscow swore allegiance to Prince Vladislav, the son of the Polish king and Grand Duke of Lithuania Sigismund III, who was elected Tsar by the Seven Boyars. In September, the army of the Commonwealth entered the Kremlin. The actual power of the Moscow government in the years 1610–1612 was minimal. Anarchy reigned in the country, the north-western lands (including Novgorod) were occupied by Swedish troops. In Tushino near Moscow, the camp of another impostor, False Dmitry II, continued to function. The camp operated until March 1610, but from December 1609 he refused to support the Impostors and supported the Polish king. In March 1610, the Tushino camp was defeated. False Dmitry II was killed in Kaluga in December 1610. To liberate Moscow from the invaders, the First People's Militia (under the leadership of Prokopy Lyapunov, Ivan Zarutsky and Prince Dmitry Trubetskoy), and then the Second People's Militia led by Kuzma Minin and Prince Dmitry Pozharsky, consistently gathered. In August 1612, the Second Militia, with part of the forces remaining near Moscow from the First Militia, defeated the army of the Commonwealth, and in October completely liberated the capital.

== Convocation of the Sobor ==
On 5 November 1612, in Moscow, deprived of support from the main forces of Hetman Khodkevich, the garrison of troops of the Commonwealth capitulated. After the liberation of the capital, it became necessary to choose a new sovereign. Letters were sent from Moscow to many cities of Russia on behalf of the liberators of Moscow – Pozharsky and Trubetskoy. Historians received information about the documents sent to Sol Vychegodskaya, Pskov, Novgorod, Uglich. These letters dated mid-November 1612 ordered the representatives of each city to arrive in Moscow until December 6. However, the elected for a long time gathered from the distant ends of the still boiling Russia. Some lands (for example, Tverskaya) were devastated and completely burned. Someone sent 10–15 people, someone just one representative. The deadline for opening meetings of the Zemsky Sobor was postponed from December 6 to January 6. In dilapidated Moscow, the only building left that could accommodate all the elected was the Assumption Cathedral of the Moscow Kremlin. The number of participants varies according to various estimates from 700 to 1,500 people.

== Candidates for the throne ==
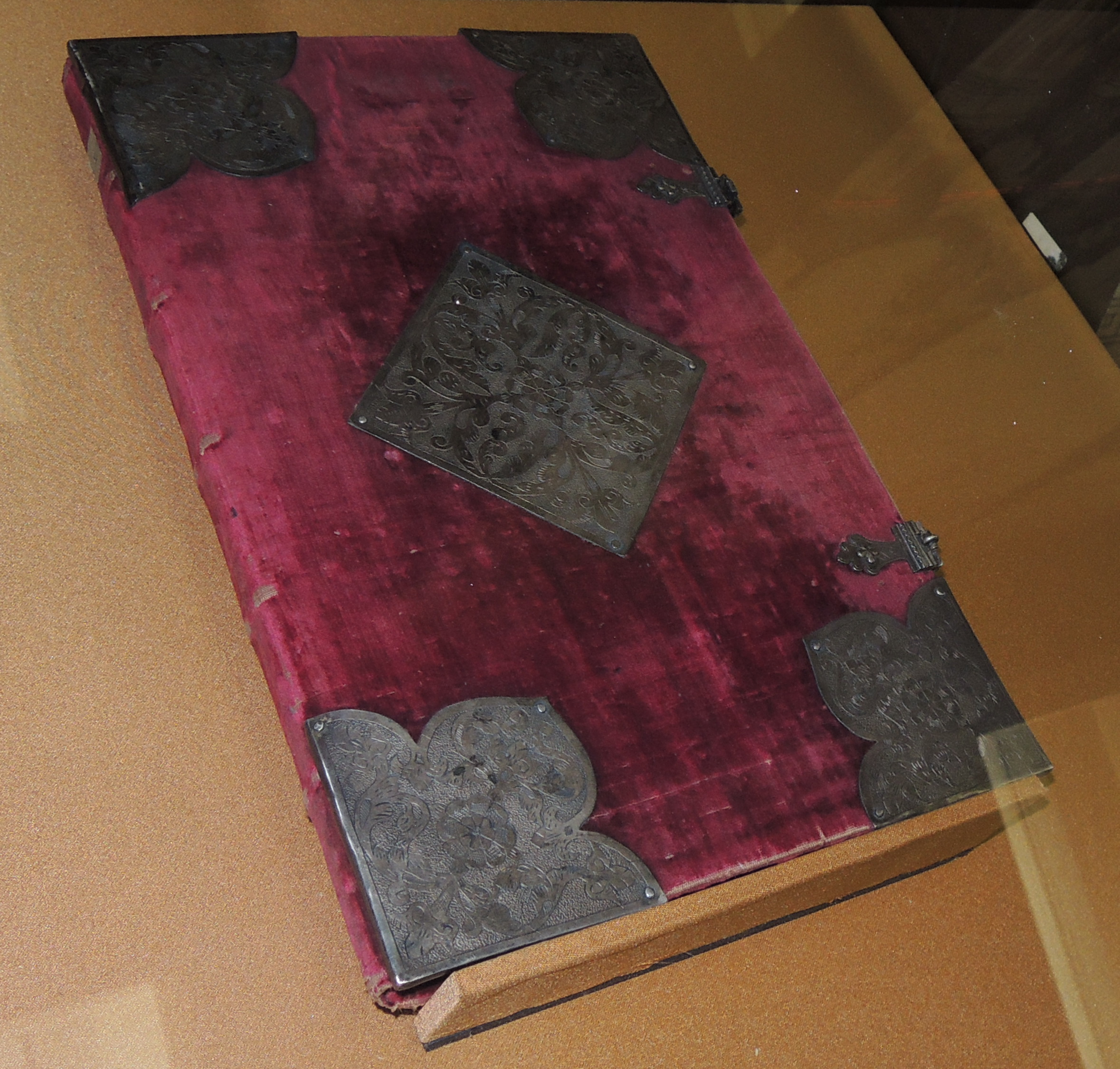
The approved letter of the Zemsky Sobor on the election of Mikhail Fedorovich to the royal throne

In 1613, in addition to Mikhail Romanov, representatives of the local nobility and representatives of the ruling dynasties of neighboring countries claimed the Russian throne. Among the latter, candidates for the throne were:

- Polish prince Vladislav, son of Sigismund III, who was elected as Tsar by the Seven Boyars in 1610
- Habsburg Archduke Maximillian;
- Swedish prince Carl Philip, son of Charles IX.

Among the representatives of the local nobility, the following surnames stood out. As can be seen from the list above, they all had serious flaws in the eyes of voters:

- Golitsyns. This genus came from Gediminas of Lithuania, but the absence of Vasily Golitsyn (he was held captive in Warsaw) deprived this genus of strong candidates;
- Mstislavsky and Kurakin families. Representatives of these noble Russian clans undermined their reputation by collaborating with the authorities of the Polish-Lithuanian Commonwealth (see Semiboyarschina);
- Vorotynsky family. According to the official version, the most influential representative of this genus, Ivan Vorotynsky, recused himself;
- Godunov and Shuysky families. Both those and others were relatives of the previously ruling monarchs. The Shuysky family, in addition, came from Rurik. However, kinship with the ousted rulers was fraught with a certain danger: ascending to the throne, the elect could be carried away by the reduction of political accounts with opponents.
- Dmitry Cherkassky;
- Dmitry Pozharsky and Dmitry Trubetskoy. They undoubtedly glorified their names during the assault on Moscow, but many were afraid of them, and they were not relatives of Ivan the Terrible and Fedor Ivanovich. Although Trubetskoy was from the Gediminids, he undermined his authority among the nobility by the command of the Cossacks, who at the last moment did not support his claim to the throne, so that there would be no turmoil among themselves, as part of them supported Cherkassky. Pozharsky, although he came from the princes of Starodubsky, but in the years of the oprichnina his family was in disgrace and fell considerably in matters of Mestnichestvo. But, most importantly, he was feared as one of the few governors who had never been tarnished by cooperation with False Dmitriy and interventionists, and this united Tushins, Cossacks and former members of the seven-boyars against him, and, most importantly, he did not put forward his candidacy.

In addition, the candidacy of Marina Mnishek and her son from a marriage with False Dmitry II, nicknamed "Vorenok", was considered.

== Motives for the election ==
According to the point of view officially recognized during the Romanov era (and later rooted in Soviet historiography), the council voluntarily, expressing the opinion of the majority of Russian residents, decided to elect Romanov, in accordance with the majority opinion. This point of view was developed by the historian Nikolai Lavrovsky, who, having studied the reports of sources, built the following scheme of events. Initially, the participants in the council decided not to choose the king from Lithuania and Sweden "with their children and Marinka with her son, as well as all foreign sovereigns", but "choose from Moscow and Russian clans". Then the participants of the Sobor began to discuss the question of whom to choose "from the Russian clans" and decided to "elect the tsar from the tribe of the righteous... blessed memory of Feodor Ivanovich of all Russia" – his nephew Mikhail Romanov. This description of the work of the Sobor was repeated many times, right up to the beginning of the 20th century. This position was held, in particular, by the largest Russian historians of the 18th – 20th centuries: Nikolay Karamzin, Sergey Solovyov, Mykola Kostomarov, Vasily Tatishchev and others.

"Then there was nobody dearer to the Russian people than the Romanov family. It has long been in popular love. There was a good memory of the first wife of Ivan Vasilievich, Anastasia, whom the people revered almost holy for her virtues. They remembered and did not forget her good brother Nikita Romanovich and condoled with his children, whom Boris Godunov had tormented and harassed. They respected Metropolitan Filaret, the former boyar Fyodor Nikitich, who was captured in Poland and seemed to be a true Russian martyr for a just cause".

— Mykola Kostomarov

== Course of the meetings ==
The cathedral opened on 16 January. The discovery was preceded by a three-day fast, the purpose of which was the cleansing of the sins of troubles. Moscow was almost completely destroyed and ruined, so they settled, regardless of their origin, who could where. Everyone converged in the Assumption Cathedral day after day. The interests of the Romanovs at the cathedral were defended by the boyar Fedor Sheremetev. Being a relative of the Romanovs (Mikhail Romanov was a relative of the largest number of other candidates) and a candidate for the throne, he, however, from the point of view of the Cossacks, could not successfully aspire to the throne, since, like some other candidates, he was part of the Seven Boyars.

One of the first decisions of the council was the refusal to consider the candidatures of Vladislav and Karl Philip, as well as Marina Mnishek:

"...But the Lithuanian and Swedish king and their children, for their many untruths, and some other people that are to be chosen for the Moscow state, and Marinka and her son – we do not want to".

— Sergey Platonov

But even after such a decision, the Romanovs were still confronted by many strong candidates. Of course, all of them had one or another shortcoming (see above). However, the Romanovs also had an important drawback – in comparison with the old Russian clans, they clearly did not shine with origin. The first historically reliable ancestor of the Romanovs is traditionally considered the Moscow boyar Andrei Kobyla, according to the Romanovs and the Sheremetevs and many other Moscow clans originating from him, who came from the Prussian princely family.

=== First version ===
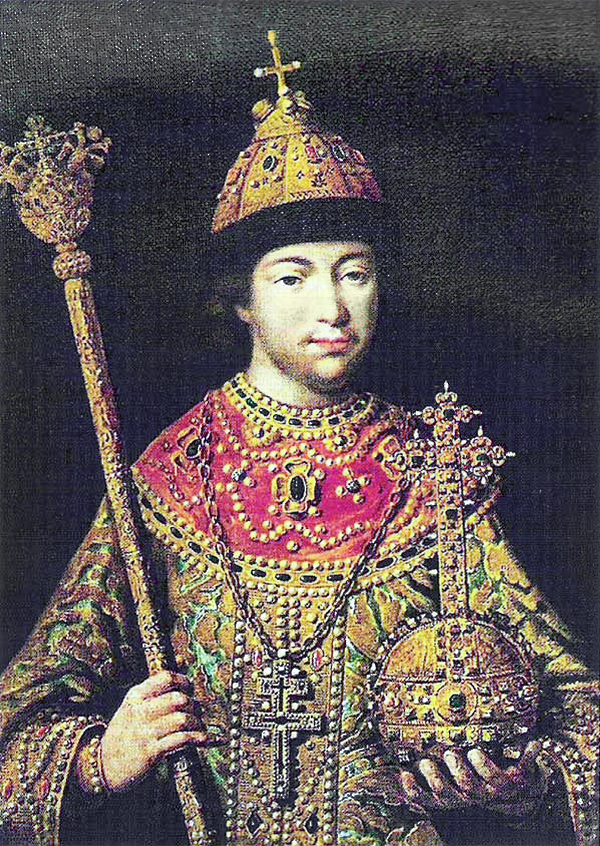
Mikhail Fedorovich after being elected to the kingdom

According to the official version, the election of the Romanovs became possible due to the fact that the candidacy of Mikhail Romanov was a compromise in many respects:

- Having received a young, inexperienced monarch on the Moscow throne, the boyars could hope to exert pressure on the king in resolving key issues;
- Mikhail's father, Patriarch Filaret, was for some time in the camp of False Dmitry II. This gave hope to defectors from the Tushino camp that Mikhail would not settle accounts with them;
- Patriarch Filaret, in addition, enjoyed undoubted authority among the clergy;
- The Romanov clan was less tarnished by collaboration with the "unpatriotic" Polish government in 1610–1612. Although Ivan Romanov was part of the Seven Boyars, he was in opposition to his other relatives (in particular, Patriarch Filaret and Mikhail Fedorovich) and did not support them at the council;
- The most liberal period of his reign was connected with Anastasia Zakharyina-Yurieva, the first wife of Tsar Ivan the Terrible.

"Let's choose Misha Romanov! – Boyar Fedor Sheremetyev campaigned without hiding his plans. "He is young and will be accustomed to us!" ...The desire to have an "inexperienced" monarch is the goal pursued by the experienced and cunning Moscow politicians, supporters of Mikhail (Alexander Degtyarev).

Lev Gumilyov outlines the reasons for the election of Mikhail Romanov to the tsardom as follows:

"The Cossacks were in favor of Mikhail, since his father, who was friends with the Tushintsy, was not an enemy of the Cossacks. The boyars remembered that the father of the applicant from a noble family and also the cousin of Fyodor Ioannovich, the last king from the clan of Ivan Kalita. The hierarchs of the church spoke in support of Romanov, since his father was a monk, with the rank of metropolitan, and for the nobles the Romanovs were good as opponents of the oprichnina."

=== Other versions ===
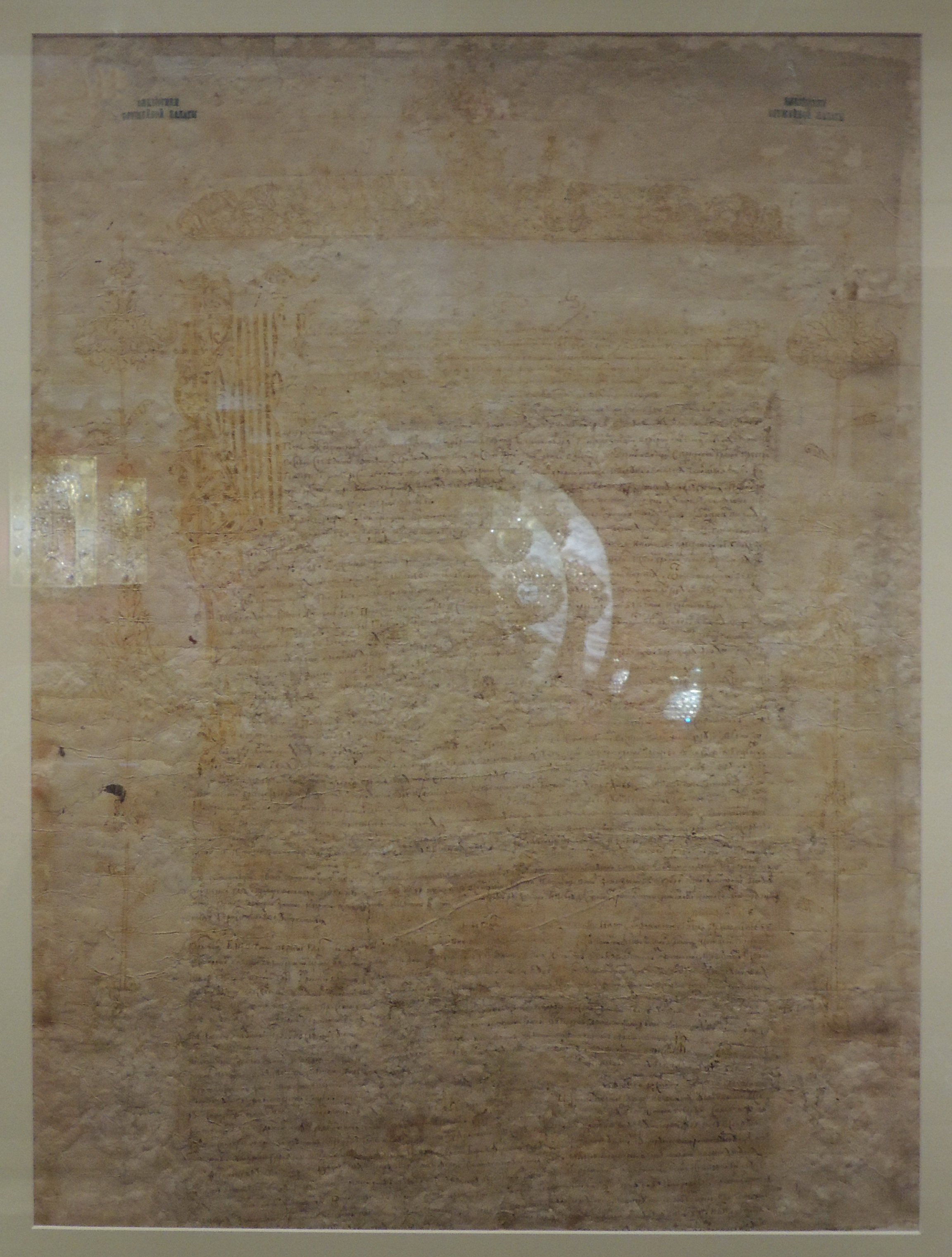
The approved letter of Zemsky Sobor on the election of Tsar Mikhail Fedorovich. Moscow, May 1613. Museum of the Moscow Kremlin. It was written in 2 copies in the form of scrolls, certified by the signatures of more than 230 participants of the Sobor (on the back) and seals of the clergy. At the moment, one of them consists of 9 sheets, in the photo – the 1st sheet

According to some historians, the decision of the Sobor was not completely voluntary. The first vote on the candidacy of Michael took place on February 4 (or 7). The result of the vote deceived Sheremetev's expectations:

"When the majority was sufficiently prepared by Sheremetev's concerns, a preliminary vote was appointed on February 4. The result undoubtedly deceived expectations, therefore, referring to the absence of many voters, they decided to decisively vote postponed for two weeks... The leaders themselves obviously needed a respite in order to better prepare public opinion"... (Kazimir Valishevsky)

Indeed, a decisive vote was set for 3 March 1613. The Sobor, however, made another decision that was not pleasing to Sheremetev: it demanded that Mikhail Romanov, like all other candidates, immediately appear at the Sobor. Sheremetev in every possible way impeded the implementation of this decision, motivating his position with security considerations. Indeed, some evidence indicates that the life of the candidate for the throne was in jeopardy. According to legend, a special detachment of the troops of the Commonwealth was sent to the village of Domnino, where Mikhail Fedorovich was hiding, to kill him, however, the Domnian peasant Ivan Susanin saved the life of the future king. Critics of the official version offer another explanation:

"Deprived of all education among the turbulent events surrounding his childhood and early youth, probably not being able to read or write, Mikhail could have spoiled everything by appearing in front of the Sobor" (Kazimir Valishevsky)

The Sobor continued to insist, but later (tentatively February 17–18) changed the decision, allowing Mikhail Romanov to stay in Kostroma. And on 3 March 1613, it elected Romanov to the kingdom.

=== Cossack intervention ===
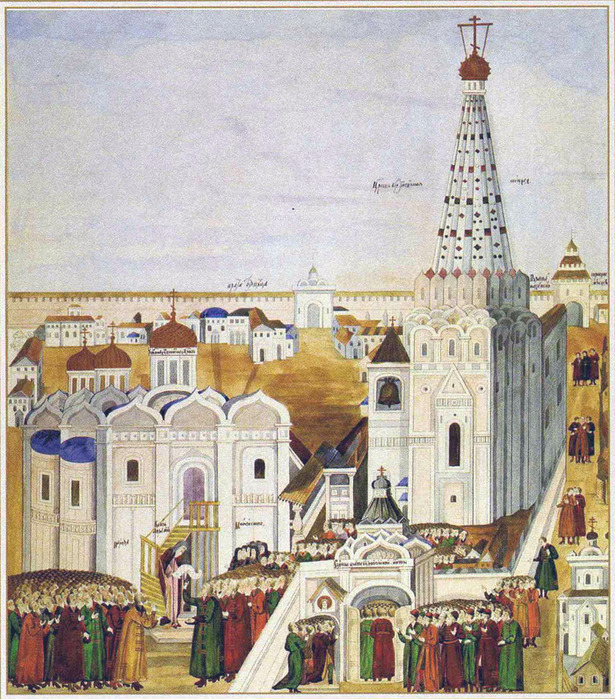
20 February 1613. On the porch of the Annunciation Cathedral of the Moscow Kremlin, Kelar of the Trinity-Sergius Lavra, Abraham Palitsyn, reads out the decision of the Zemsky Sobor "On the election of the boyar Mikhail Fedorovich Romanov to the royal throne". ("The Book of the Election of the Tsar and Grand Duke Mikhail Fedorovich", 1672–1673)

Some evidence points to a possible reason for this change. On 10 February 1613, two merchants arrived in Novgorod, reporting the following:

"The Russian Cossacks, who are in Moscow, wished to be the Grand Dukes of a boyar named Prince Mikhail Fedorovich Romanov. But the boyars were completely against it and rejected it at the Council, which was recently convened in Moscow". (Leo Cherepnin)

And here is the testimony of the peasant Fyodor Bobyrkin, who also arrived in Novgorod, dated 26 July 1613 – five days after the coronation:

"Moscow ordinary people and Cossacks, of their own free will and without the general consent of other zemstvo officials, chose Grand Duke Fedorov's son, Mikhail Fedorovich Romanov, who is now in Moscow. Zemsky ranks and boyars do not respect him". (Leo Cherepnin)

The Lithuanian commander Lev Sapega reported the results of the election to the prisoner Filaret, the father of the newly elected monarch:

"Only your Cossacks donors sent your son to the Moscow state". (Sergey Platonov)

Here's a story written by another eyewitness to the events.

"The boyars pulled time at the Sobor, trying to solve the question of the king secretly from the Cossacks and waiting for their departure from Moscow. But they not only did not leave, but behaved more actively. Once, having consulted "with all the Cossack army", they sent up to five hundred people to the Krutitsy Metropolitan. Having forcibly broken the gates, burst into his courtyard and, using rude words, demanded: "Give us, Metropolitan, the Tsar to Russia, whom we worship and serve, and ask for their salaries, die to death with a smooth death!" (Romanovs, Historical Porters, edited by Elena Leonova)

The terrified metropolitan fled to the boyars. Hastily convened everyone at the Sobor. Cossack chieftains repeated their demand. The boyars presented them with a list of eight boyars – the most worthy candidates, in their opinion. The list included Prince Fyodor Mstislavsky, Prince Dmitry Pozharsky, Prince Dmitry Trubetskoy, Prince Peter Pronsky, Prince Ivan Vorotynsky, Prince Ivan Cherkassky, Fedor Sheremetev, Ivan Romanov, and Mikhail Romanov was not. Then one of the Cossack chieftains spoke:

"Princes and boyars and all Moscow nobles! Not by God's will, but by sovereignty and of your own free will, you choose the autocratic. But according to God's will and with the blessing of... Grand Duke Fyodor Ivanovich of all Russia, with his blessed memory, to whom he, sovereign, bless your tsar's staff and rule Prince Fedor Nikitich Romanov in Russia. And he is now captivated in Lithuania. And from the gracious root and the industry is kind and honor – his son Prince Mikhailo Fedorovich. May it be according to God's will on the reigning city of Moscow and all Russia, that there will be a Tsar sovereign and Grand Duke Mikhailo Fedorovich of all Russia..." (ibid.)

== Embassy to Kostroma ==
On March 2, an embassy under the leadership of the Ryazan archbishop Feodorit Troitsky was sent to Mikhail Romanov and his mother on behalf of Zemsky Sobor to Kostroma. The embassy included archimandrites of the Chudov, Novospassky, Simonov monasteries, the boyars Fyodor Sheremetev, Vladimir Bakhteyarov-Rostovsky, boyar children, and orderly people elected from cities. The purpose of the embassy was to inform Michael of his election to the throne and to give him a Sobor oath. According to the official version, Mikhail was frightened and flatly refused to reign, so the ambassadors had to show all their eloquence to convince the future king to accept the crown. Critics of the "Romanov" concept express doubts about the sincerity of rejection and note that the conciliar oath has no historical value:

"Strictly speaking, this document has no historical value. Designed to serve as a protocol of a great event, it consists in large part of a literal copy of Godunov’s electoral letter; the very speech delivered to Boris by Patriarch Job is here pounded by the mouth of Archbishop Feodorit addressing Mikhail". (Kazimir Valishevsky)

One way or another, Michael agreed to take the throne and went to Moscow, where he arrived on 12 May 1613.

The coronation in Moscow took place on 21 July 1613.

== Sources ==
- Belokurov, Sergei (1906). Approved Certificate (On the Election of Mikhail Fedorovich Romanov to the Moscow State). Moscow.
- Kazimir Valishevsky, The Time of Troubles, Moscow, IKPA, 1989
- Ilya Vasilevsky. Romanovs from Michael to Nikolai – Rostov: Maprecon, 1993
- Faina Grimberg, "The Romanov Dynasty. Puzzles. Versions. Problems", Moscow, Moscow Lyceum, 1996
- Lev Gumilyov, "From Rus to Russia", Saint Petersburg, "UNA", 1992
- German Zamyatin. From the History of the Struggle of Sweden and Russia over the Moscow Throne at the Beginning of the 17th Century. The Fall of Karl Philip and the Accession of Mikhail Fedorovich // German Zamyatin. Russia and Sweden at the Beginning of the 17th Century. Essays on Political and Military History. Saint Petersburg, 2008
- Alexander Degtyarev. (Scientific Review by Ruslan Skrynnikov), "The Difficult Age of the Russian Kingdom", Leningrad, "Children's Literature", 1988
- Nikolai Karamzin, "History of the Russian State", in 12 Volumes, in 3 Books, Kaluga, "Golden Alley", 1993
- Vasily Klyuchevsky, "Russian History. A Full Course of Lectures in 3 Books", Moscow, "Thought", 1993
- Felix Lurie, "Russian and World History in the Tables", Saint Petersburg, "Art–Saint Petersburg", 1997
- Boris Pashkov, "Rus. Russia. The Russian Empire. Chronicle of Reigns and Events of 862–1917", Moscow, CenterCom, 1997
- Sergey Platonov, "Works on Russian History", Saint Petersburg, "Stroilstavchit", 1994
- "Romanovs. Historical Portraits", edited by Elena Leonova, Moscow, "Armada", 1997
- "The Centennial of the Romanov Dynasty", Reprinted Reproduction of the Anniversary Edition of 1913, Moscow, "Sovremennik", 1991
- Boris Florya. The Election of Tsar Michael // Motherland – 2013 – No. 2 – Pages 2–7
- Leo Cherepnin, "Zemsky Sobors of the Russian State in the 16–17th Centuries", Moscow, "Science", 1978
- Dmitry Volodikhin. Zemsky Sobor in 1613
- Homeland, 2013. No. 2
