= False Dmitry =

The generic name False Dmitry (also Pseudo-Demetrius, Russian: Лжедмитрий, Lžedmitrij) refers to various impostors who passed themselves off as the deceased Tsarevich Dmitry Ivanovich of Russia, the youngest son of Ivan the Terrible, and claimed the Russian throne during the Time of Troubles (1598–1613), after the real Dmitry's death at the age of eight in 1591. Each of these impostors claimed to have miraculously escaped the assassination attempt that appeared to have claimed Dmitry's life, and, in the case of II and III, also to have escaped the assassinations that subsequently targeted I and II.

Several people impersonated Dmitry Ivanovich, most prominently:

- False Dmitry I (1582–1606), who actually became Tsar of all Russia and reigned 1605–1606
- False Dmitry II, active 1607–1610
- False Dmitry III, active 1611–1612
- False Dimitry IV active 1611–1612 (some argue that False Dmitry IV is just False Dmitry III due to bad record keeping)

== See also ==
- Tsarevich Ivan Dmitriyevich, son of False Dmitry II, sometimes referred to as False Dmitry IV
