= Tushino (disambiguation) =

Tushino is a former village and town to the north of Moscow.

Tushino may also refer to:

- Tushino Airfield, a former general aviation airfield located in Tushino
- Tushino Camp, the shadow capital of False Dmitry II, near Tushino
- Tushino constituency, a Russian legislative constituency in Moscow
- Severnoye Tushino District or Northern Tushino, an administrative district (raion) of the North-Western Administrative Okrug
- Yuzhnoye Tushino District, an administrative district (raion) of the North-Western Administrative Okrug
- 2003 Tushino bombing, a terrorist attack that occurred on July 5, 2003 at Tushino Airfield
