= Tushino Camp =

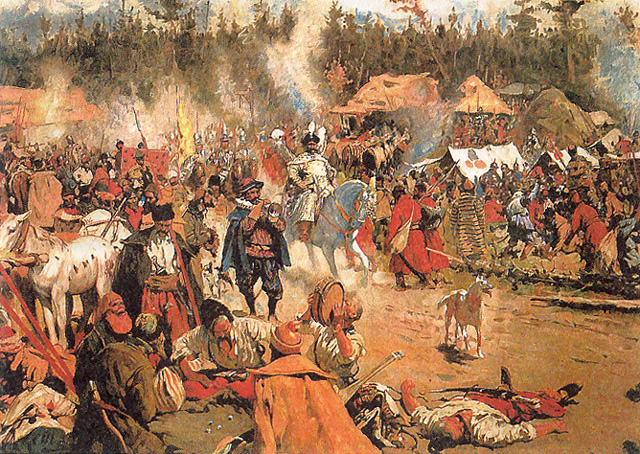
Sergey Ivanov. "In the Time of Troubles"

The Tushino Camp was the camp of False Dmitry II near the village of Tushino near Moscow from June 1608 to December 1609. The Tushino Camp served as False Dimitry II's capital, and as a result False Dimitry II received the name "Tushino Thief." All those dissatisfied with the elected Tsar Vasily Shuisky, flocked to the Tushino Camp, which made it a shadow capital with its own state institutions and leaders. From December 1609 to March 1610, the Tushino Camp supported the Polish King Sigismund.

== Location ==
The camp was located on the Volokolamsk Road on a hill outside the village of Tushino. It was located between the Skhodnya and Moskva Rivers, in the place where the Skhodnya flows into the Moskva River. The camp was located on a high hill from which the territory was visible for several miles in the direction of Moscow. The hill was surrounded by cliffs to the north, east, and south. To the west the camp was surrounded by an earthen rampart, the remains of which were visible at the beginning of the 20th century. In addition, wooden fortifications were built. The Cossack camp was separated from the main camp by the river. False Dmitry II lived in a palace built to the west of Tushino near the Spassky Monastery on the banks of the Moskva River. False Dmitry's palace was located on a hill surrounded by a rampart and a moat. The hill was later given the name received the name "Tsarikova Gora", which remained in use until the beginning of the 20th century.

== Camp formation ==
In the two–day Battle Near Bolkhov (April 30 – May 1, 1608) False Dmitry II defeated the army of Vasily Shuisky. False Dimitry II then moved to Moscow. The independent detachment of Alexander Lisovsky, who was serving False Dmitry II, defeated Prince Khovansky during the Battle of Zaraisk and took Tushino. Lisovsky, having assessed his position, apparently, prompted False Dmitry II to set up a camp there. Depending on the source, False Dimitry II arrived either on June 1 or June 14. False Dimitry II initially stopped in Tushino and then tried to move the camp to the village of Taininskoye. However, he was cut off from his base from his base – the Seversk Land – by Shuisky's troops, who occupied the Kaluga Road. This led him to return to Tushino and settled there. One of his commanders, Joseph Budilo, wrote the following in his notes describing the founding of the Tushino Camp:

The same year on June 24, on the feast of Saint John, the Tsar approached the capital city of Moscow. There was no army there except the guards. When the Tsar, not finding a convenient place for a camp, walked around Moscow and, heading back to Tushino, reached the village of Taininskoye, then Shuisky's army attacked him in a cramped place, but with God's help it was defeated. The Tsar's army was stationed at Tushino, near the monastery of Saint Nicholas in a place overgrown with sycamore.

Shuisky's army, sent against the impostor, camped on the Khodynka River near the village of Vsekhsvyatskoye (now the Sokol District), while the Tatar cavalry was stationed in the village of Horoshevo; the second line with the Tsar himself was on the Presnya River in Vagankovo. At night, Shuisky's army was attacked by Rozhinsky and fled to Presnya, where, having received reinforcements from the tsarist reserve, in turn threw the Pretender back to Khimka, but from there it was again driven back to Khodynka. After that, the Pretender's troops finally concentrated in Tushino, since the actual commander of Hetman Rozhinsky adopted a plan to blockade Moscow and bring it to surrender by starvation.

== Tushino with an impostor ==
Initially, tents were pitched, but with the onset of winter, when snow had already begun to fill them, dugouts were dug, and stalls were made of brushwood and straw for the horses, but this turned out to be insufficient. Then the surrounding towns and villages were imposed a duty on the supply of log cabins to Tushino: "another captain received three log cabins and settled down with complete convenience".

Soon a full–fledged and numerous city grew on the site of the camp, and the former dugouts turned into cellars, which, thanks to constant requisitions, were bursting with supplies. Around the military camp a trading settlement was formed, where some Polish merchants, according to Markhocki's testimony, numbered up to three thousand; merchants from Moscow also went there.

Immediately with the appearance of the Pretender in Tushino, a massive transfer to his side from Moscow began. The first to run across were princes Alexei Sitsky and Dmitry Cherkassky, followed by Dmitry and Yuri Trubetskoy. Two princes Zasekin fled to Tushino, Mikhailo Buturlin, Prince Vasily Rubets–Mosalsky, Mikhail Saltykov and others. The Boyar Duma was composed of them, the de facto leader of which was Saltykov; however, noblemen and even one peasant (Ivan Naumov), not to mention the leader of the Zaporozhye Cossacks, Ivan Zarutsky, sat there, mixed with representatives of the ancient boyar families.

The court and the government were organized on the model of Moscow. Prince Semyon Zvenigorodsky was appointed as the butler, from the ancient, but fallen into insignificance, branch of the Chernigov princes; prikazes were instituted, at the head of which were placed clerks Ivan Gramotin, Pyotr Tretyakov, Bogdan Sutupov, Ivan Chicherin and finally Fyodor Andronov, who had fled from Moscow. The last former large leather merchant, then the Duma clerk and treasurer under Shuisky, accused of abuses, was appointed by the impostor as the head of the order of the Big Treasury and concentrated the entire financial side of the Tushino government in his hands.

The actual leader of the Tushino Camp, acting on behalf of the nominal "tsarik", was hetman Roman Ruzhinsky, a young Lithuanian prince from the Gediminovichs. Such major commanders as Alexander Lisovsky and Jan Pyotr Sapega, who came a little later with a large detachment, the Usvyatsky Headman and cousin of the Lithuanian Chancellor, acted semi–independently (however, they operated far from Tushino). Finally, the leader of the Cossacks, the Zaporozhets Ivan Zarutsky, stood out, either a Pole or a Polonized Ukrainian from the Russian Voivodeship, who received the rank of boyar and the post of Head of the Cossack Order.

Soon, the "queen" Marina Mnishek appeared in Tushino, released to Poland in accordance with the peace treaty concluded with King Sigismund III, was intercepted on the way by Zborovsky's detachment in August and taken to Tushino, where she "recognized" her murdered husband in the Pretender, and then secretly she married him in the Sapoga Detachment (September 5 – the wedding was performed by her Jesuit confessor). The impostor, for his part, promised her upon accession three thousand rubles and income from 14 cities. Finally, in Tushino, his named patriarch appeared – namely, Filaret (Romanov), the father of the future Tsar Mikhail Fedorovich. As the Bishop of Rostov, he was captured by the Tushinites during the capture of Rostov in October 1608, and in disgrace, on the woods and tied to a dissolute woman, was brought to Tushino; however, False Dmitry showered him, as his imaginary relative, with favors, appointing him patriarch, which Filaret did not dare to refuse – and as a patriarch began to perform divine services and send district letters to the regions. Seeing such an example, representatives of the clergy flocked to Tushino.

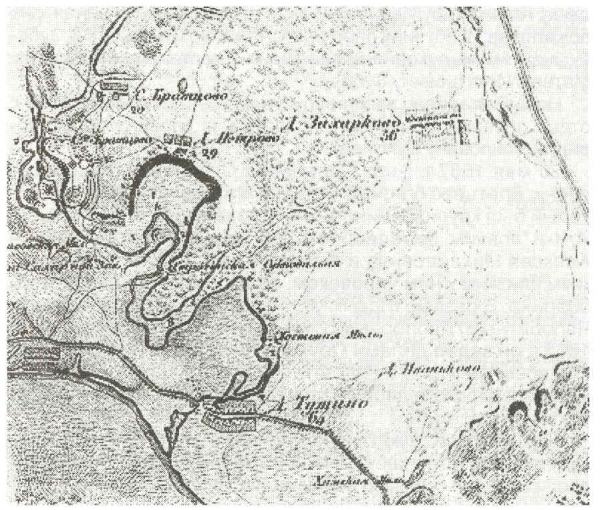
Tushino and surroundings. Fragment of a topographic map of Moscow in 1818

Often, representatives of the same family served both in Moscow and in Tushino, which was supposed to guarantee the family in case of any turn of events. Some fled from Moscow to Tushino and back several times, with each betrayal receiving new awards, which, in turn, had to be sanctioned by the other owner in case of repeated betrayal. These have received the nickname "Tushino flights". "Encyclopedic Dictionary of Brockhaus and Efron" defines the army of the "Tushino Thief" in 7,000 Poles, about 10,000 Cossacks and "tens of thousands of armed rabble", at some moments approaching 100,000. According to Sergei Solovyov's calculations, there were 18,000 Poles, 2,000 infantry, 13,000 Zaporozhye Cossacks, 15,000 Don Cossacks, "except for the Russian people, the Poles did not keep many of the latter in the camp, because they were not trusted". This horde subjected to terrible devastation all the areas into which it penetrated. At the same time, as noted by Sergei Solovyov, it was not the Poles who did not feel any hatred of the local population that raged most of all, but the Russians, who had nowhere to flee in case of failure and who regarded all Shuisky's supporters as personal enemies. And if the Poles, having captured Shuisky's supporter, often treated him mercifully, the Russians put the prisoners to painful death, to the horror and disgust of the Poles. Especially the Cossacks raged, who "saw themselves as an evil enemy in every civilian living by the fruits of honest labor, and over him they exhausted all their ferocity". The Cossacks brought everything they encountered to senseless destruction: in those houses that they could not burn, they at least broke down gates and doors so that it was impossible to live in them; provisions that they could not carry, they destroyed: drowned, thrown into the manure or thrown under the hooves of their horses. Someone Nalivaiko distinguished himself in the Vladimir Region by impaling men and raping all women, so that "he beat to death with his own hands, noblemen and boyar children and all sorts of people, men and wives, 93 people"; in the end he was taken prisoner by the Vladimir Governor Velyaminov (a supporter of the Pretender) and hanged by him on the orders of the Pretender.

In the fall of 1608, the flight from Moscow took on a rampant character – especially after at the end of September Sapega defeated a detachment moved against him at Rakhmanov, after which he laid Siege to the Trinity–Sergius Monastery. The New Chronicler describes the situation in Moscow as follows: "A great famine began to exist in Moscow, one quarter of rye was sold for seven rubles, and because of the famine, many came from Moscow to Tushino; the rest came to Tsar Vasily saying: how long can we endure hunger, or give us bread, or we'll leave the city". This led to uprisings and several attempts to overthrow Shuisky: February 25, April 2 and May 5, 1610. However, in Tushino itself, on February 1, a riot also broke out, as the Poles demanded payment of salaries. Since, with all their desire, the Poles could not find the required amount of coins, they divided the country between feeding units – "bailiffs", which the inhabitants compared with the former appanage principalities, and began to plunder them whenever possible.

By that time, the Poles and "thieves" took control of a significant part of the country: Yaroslavl, Kostroma, Vladimir, Suzdal, Vologda, Murom, Uglich, Galich, Kashin, Pskov and other cities submitted to False Dmitry – in all, 22 cities. It seemed that the turmoil had reached its climax.

== Discord in the Tushino Camp ==
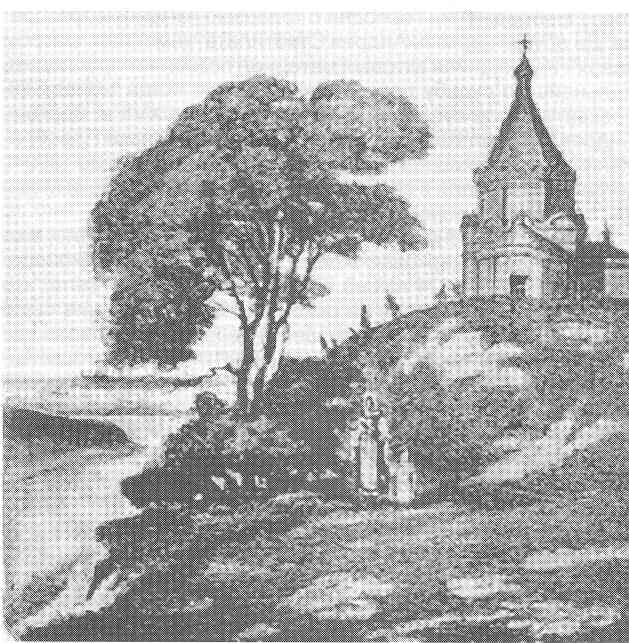
Church of the Transfiguration of the Savior in the village of Spas (Tushino). Lithograph of the 19th century. The former Church of Andrei Stratilat of the Spassky Monastery (about 1587) was the only building that survived in the monastery after the Troubles. Demolished in 1890

The turn occurred after the conclusion of the Shuisky alliance with the Swedes, alarmed by the strengthening of hostile Poland. On February 28, 1609, in Vyborg, the young nephew of the Tsar, Mikhail Skopin–Shuisky, signed an agreement with the Swedish King Charles IX, who promised to provide an army in exchange for the Korelsky District and an alliance for the conquest of Livonia. On May 10, Skopin set out from Novgorod and moved towards Moscow, crushing Tushino troops on the way. In July, he defeated Sapega at Kalyazin. On February 6, 1610, Sapega was forced to lift the Siege of Trinity and retreat to Dmitrov.

=== Polonization of the Tushino Camp ===
For his part, the Polish King Sigismund III, having presented as an excuse the clearly directed alliance of Russia with Sweden, invaded Moscow's possessions and in September besieged Smolensk. Tushino Poles at first took this with irritation, immediately forming a confederation against the king and demanding that he leave the country, which they already considered their own. However, Jan Peter Sapega did not join the confederation and demanded negotiations with the king – his position had a significant impact on the further course of affairs. For his part, Sigismund sent commissars to Tushino, headed by Stanislav Stadnitsky, demanding help from them both from their subjects and offering them extensive rewards both from the Moscow treasury and in Poland; as for the Russians, they were promised the preservation of the faith and all customs and also rich rewards. This seemed tempting to the Tushino Poles, and negotiations began between them and the royal commissars, and not only Poles, but also many Russians began to lean on the king's side. The Pretender's attempt to remind himself and his "rights" provoked the following rebuff from Ruzhinsky: "What is it to you, why did the commissars come to me? God knows who you are? We have shed enough blood for you, but we see no benefit".

=== Kaluga Faction ===
On December 10, the Pretender tried to escape with four hundred Don Cossacks loyal to him, but was caught and de facto arrested by Rozhinsky. However, on December 27, 1609, he still fled to Kaluga, disguised as a peasant and hiding in a sleigh with a plank (according to another version, even with manure). The Don Cossacks and part of the Poles under the leadership of Jan Tyshkevich, Rozhinsky's personal enemy, followed him (thus it came to a shootout between supporters of Tyshkevich and Rozhinsky). However, the Russian Tushinians immediately went in procession to the royal ambassadors, expressing their joy at getting rid of the "thief". On February 11, she fled to Dmitrov to Sapega, and from there to Kaluga and Marina Mnishek – on horseback in a hussar dress, accompanied by a servant and several Don Cossacks. At that time in Tushino itself the following was happening: Jan Tyshkevich brought from Kaluga a letter from the Pretender with promises, which caused a new ferment among the Poles; but Rozhinsky had already firmly taken the royal side and was leading the matter towards an agreement with Sigismund, for which an embassy was sent to Smolensk from the Poles and Russians, who entered into a confederation with the Poles and decided on their part to call the King's son Vladislav (son of Sigismund) to the kingdom, subject to acceptance him Orthodoxy. This embassy was headed by Mikhail Saltykov, a prominent role in it was played by Fyodor Andropov and Prince Vasily Rubets–Masalsky; on January 31, they submitted to the King a draft treaty drawn up by Saltykov; in response, Sigismund proposed to the ambassadors a constitutional plan, according to which the Zemsky Sobor and the Boyar Duma received the rights of an independent legislative, and the Duma at the same time – and the judiciary. The Tushino ambassadors accepted the conditions and swore allegiance, "As long as God gives us sovereign Vladislav for the Muscovite State", "to serve and direct and wish his sovereign father, the current most poignant King of Poland and Grand Duke of Lithuania Sigismund Ivanovich". In general, Sigismund, who made its complete reconciliation as a condition for the departure of his 15-year–old son to Moscow, was clearly trying to take the reins into his own hands.

== End of the Tushino Camp ==
Meanwhile, however, the situation in Tushino itself was becoming critical. In the south, in Kaluga, troops loyal to False Dmitry II were concentrated; in the north, near Dmitrov, Skopin–Shuisky and the Swedes, who were hardly restrained by Sapega, were pressing. In such conditions, Rozhinsky decided to move to Volokolamsk – namely, to the Joseph–Volotsky Monastery. On March 16, the residents of Tushino set their camp on fire and set out on a march with a "quick custom". Two days later they were in Volok – mostly Poles, since the Russians mostly fled. Konstantin Kalaydovich, who investigated the remains of the Tushino Camp on behalf of Nikolay Karamzin, wrote down a legend that the Tushinites did not leave themselves, but were knocked out in battle by a Moscow detachment that burst into the camp from the side of the ancient settlement, at the confluence of the Gorodenka River into Skhodnya (from the north). Neither Russian nor Polish written sources report this battle; most likely it was a minor attack on the Polish rearguard.

== Fate of the "Tushinites" ==
The pro–Polish Tushinites (Mikhail Saltykov) supported the Seven Boyars and the Polish occupation of Moscow. Anti–Polish Tushinites (Ivan Zarutsky) took part in the First Militia.

== Excavations at the site of the Tushino Camp ==
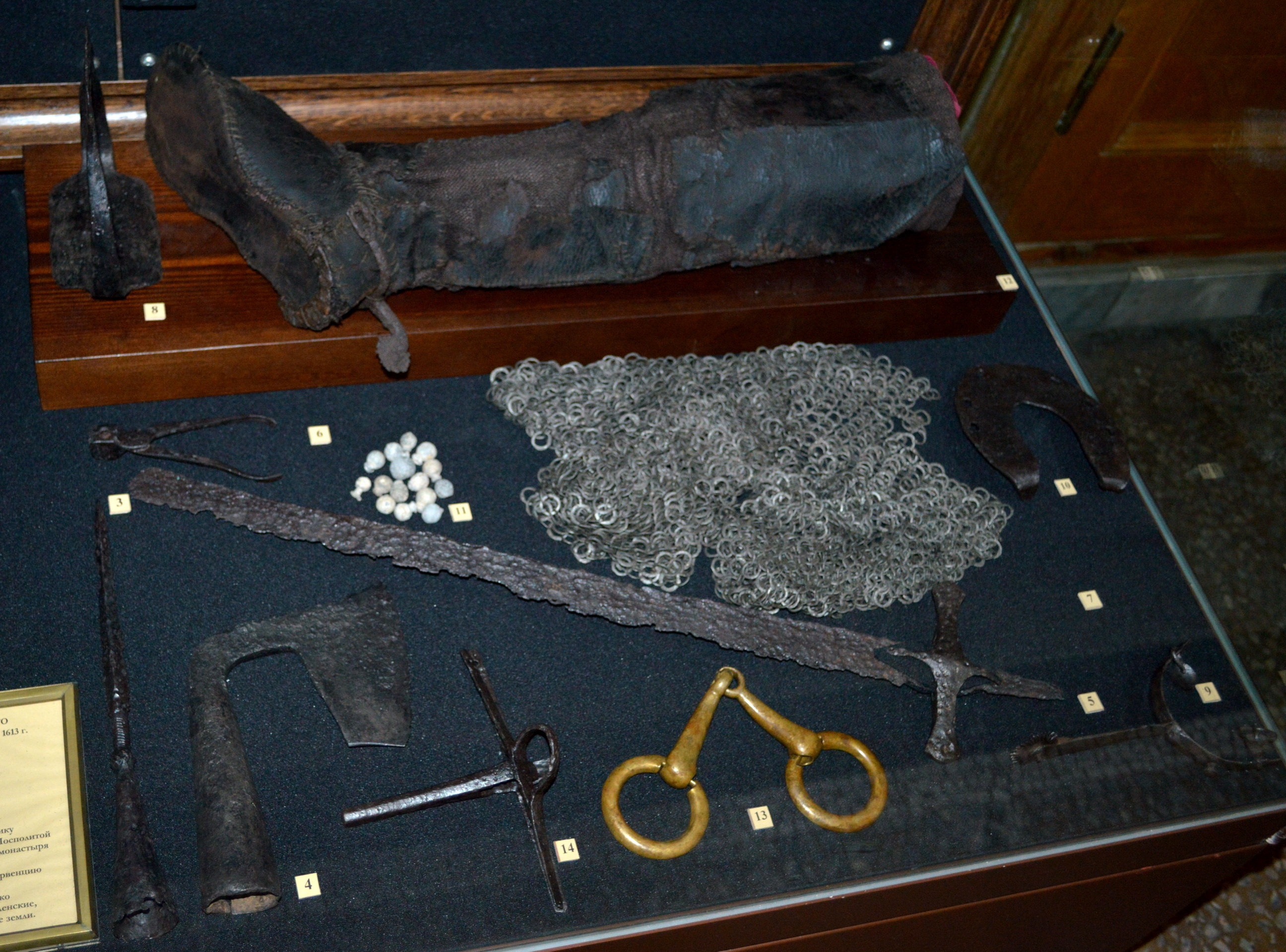
Archaeological finds at the site of the Tushino Camp

As can be seen from Kalaydovich's notes, at the beginning of the 19th century, the Tushino people, at least the old people, still retained a vivid and detailed memory of the events of the Troubles. At the end of the same century, that is, only three generations later, local residents could not even tell Ivan Tokmakov where the name Tsarikova Gora came from. Memories of the Tushino people now boiled down to the fact that ancient burial mounds located in the district began to be considered their graves, and the largest of them was legendary that the untold treasures of False Dmitry were supposedly hidden there.

In 1898, during the construction of the Moscow–Vindavskaya (now Riga) Railway, many finds were made near Tushino. The excavations were carried out by the engineer–traveler Politkovsky under the scientific supervision of Academician Zabelin. As a result, a collection of 560 items was collected, donated to the Imperial Historical Museum, where it is still partly on display (in particular, you can see kernels, "garlic" – sharp thorns that were thrown at the feet of horses, and Polish boot with a spur). Samples of weapons are of particular interest: barrels of arquebuses, a bullet, several bardiches and axes, spears, as well as horse comb, shishaks, chain mails, shells. Also tools and household items were found: scythes, sickles, chisels, axes, armchairs, scissors, finally utensils: doorknobs, beads and locks, both hinged and internal, tiles, and finally a large number of coins, both Polish and coins of "Tsar Dmitry Ivanovich" minted in Tushino. The items found were charred, which confirmed reports of the burning of Tushino.

== Sources ==
- Nikolay Markhotsky (2000). History of the Moscow War. Moscow: Russian Political Encyclopedia. ISBN 5-8243-0005-4.
