= False Dmitry III =

Pretender to the Russian throne

Dmitry Ivanovich
- Pretender
- Born: 19 October 1582 (claimed)
- Died: July 1612 (aged 29) (Note: His birthdate is claimed so he may not have been 29 when he died.); Moscow, Russia
- Title(s): Pretended Tsar of Russia
- Throne(s) claimed: Russia
- Pretend from: 1607
- Connection with: Claimed to be Dmitri Ivanovich, (Note: Also known as Dmitry of Uglich) half brother of Feodor I, False Dmitry I and False Dmitry II.
- Father: Ivan IV (claimed)
- Mother: Maria Nagaya (claimed)
- Predecessor: False Dmitry II
- Successor: False Dmitry IV (Note: False Dmitry IV may have just been False Dmitry III due to bad record keeping.) or Ivan Dmitriyevich

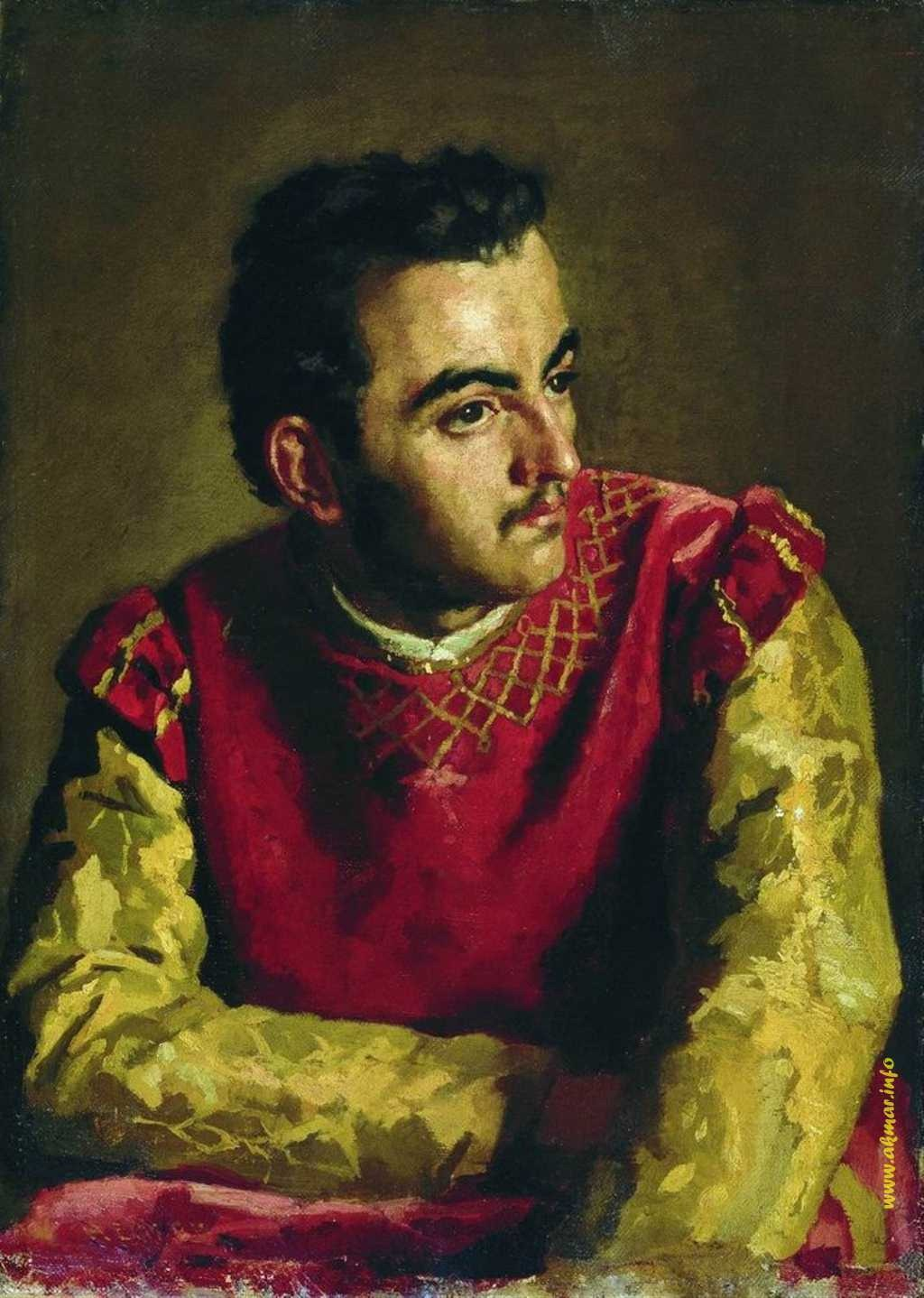

False Dmitry III (Russian: Лжедмитрий III, romanized: Lzhedmitrii III; died July 1612), historically known as Pseudo-Demetrius III, was the last and most enigmatic of three pretenders to the Russian throne who claimed to be the youngest son of Ivan the Terrible; Tsarevich Dmitry.

== Biography ==
Supposed to have been a deacon called Sidorka, he appeared suddenly, from behind the river Narva, in the Ingrian town of Ivangorod, proclaiming himself the Tsarevich Dmitry Ivanovich, on March 28, 1611. The Cossacks, ravaging the environs of Moscow, acknowledged him as Tsar on March 2, 1612, and under threat of vengeance in case of non-compliance, the gentry of Pskov also "kissed the cross" (i.e., swore allegiance) to the rebel/criminal of Pskov (псковский вор), as he was usually nicknamed. On May 18, 1612, he fled from Pskov, was seized and delivered up to the authorities at Moscow, and was secretly executed there.

== See also ==
- Time of Troubles
- Dymitriads
- False Dmitry I
- False Dmitry II
- Šćepan Mali
