= Peter Urusov =

Peter Urusov or Ouroussoff may refer to:

- Peter Arslanovich Urusov, a Tatar prince who killed False Dmitry II in 1610
- Pyotr Vasilyevich Ouroussoff, co-founder of the Bolshoi Ballet in 1776
