= Tsarevich Ivan Dmitriyevich =

Son of False Dmitry II of Russia

Ivan Dmitriyevich
- Pretender
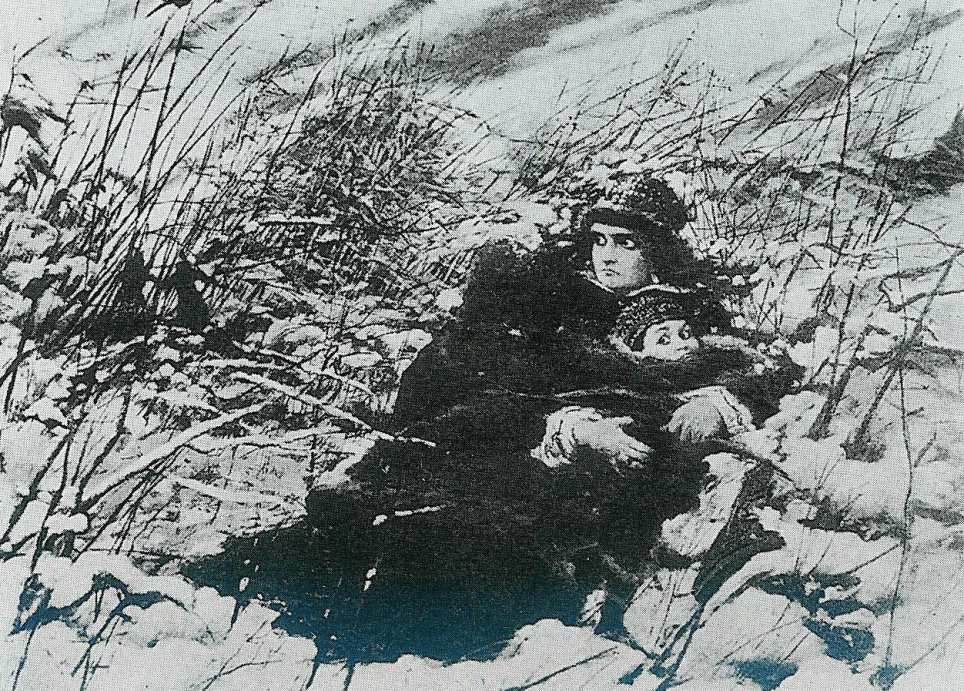
- "Escape" by Leon Wyczółkowsky, depicting Ivan with his mother Marina Mniszech
- Born: 5 January [O.S. 26 December 1610] 1611; Kaluga, Tsardom of Russia
- Died: 16 July [O.S. 6 July] 1614 (aged 3); Moscow, Tsardom of Russia
- Regnal name claimed: Ivan V of Russia
- Title(s): Tsarevich of Russia (would later have been Tsar of Russia)
- Throne(s) claimed: Tsardom of Russia
- Monarchy abolished: December 1610
- Last monarch: False Dmitry II
- Connection with: son
- Royal House: Rurik (claimed) (father was a usurper)
- Father: False Dmitry II
- Mother: Marina Mniszech

Ivan Dmitriyevich (Russian: Иван Дмитриевич, nicknamed as Ivashka the Little Rebel/Criminal, Russian: Ивашка Ворёнок; 5 January [O.S. 26 December 1610] 1611 – 16 July [O.S. 6 July] 1614) was the only son of False Dmitry II of Russia ("Rebel/Criminal of Tushino", Russian: Тушинский вор) and his wife Marina Mniszech, daughter of Polish Voivode Jerzy Mniszech and his wife Jadwiga Tarło. He was a claimant to the throne of the Tsardom of Russia until his death at the age of three, in July 1614. He was killed right after his step-father, Ivan Zarutsky.

== Early life ==
=== False Dmitry I, False Dmitry II and Marina Mniszech ===
On 8 May 1606, Marina Mniszech married False Dmitry I, Tsar of Russia and thus became Tsarita consort of All Russia. However, this lasted just 9 days. On 17 May 1606, conspirators who opposed Dmitri and his policy of close cooperation with Poland, broke into the Moscow Kremlin. Dmitry attempted to escape out a window, but he broke his leg while climbing out. He was immediately spotted by a plotter and he was shot on the spot. After the death of False Dmitry I, Marina was spared her life – after she had rejected her royal title – and sent back to Poland in July 1608. However, her father Jerzy Mniszech didn't give up on his plan to become father-in-law of the Tsar. Exiled to Yaroslavl, he searched for a way to regain his favours. With his help, Marina turned up in Tushino, where she would secretly marry another impostor, False Dmitry II after "recognizing" her miraculously "salvaged" husband in him, even though they looked absolutely nothing alike and it was impossible for Dmitry I to have been saved, as his body had been put for display after his murder. Polish hetman Stanisław Żółkiewski wrote in his memoirs that the only two things False Dmitris I and II had in common was that they were both human and usurpers. This marriage would soon share the same fate as her previous one, as Dmitry II was killed by a Tatar prince, Peter Urusov.

=== Birth of the Tsarevich and Ivan Zarutsky ===
After the 10 December 1610 murder of False Dmitry II, Marina was once again left widowed. She was, this time, however, pregnant and on 5 January 1611 (O.S. 26 December 1610), she delivered a baby boy, whom she named Ivan. The infant was subsequently nicknamed Little Rogue, Baby Brigand or Luba. She met Cossack leader Ivan Zarutsky and by April 1611, they were married. Zarutsky took a liking to little Ivan, and using the fact that Marina was a widow of two Tsars, he proclaimed four-month-old Ivan "Ivan Dmitriyevich" (literally, Ivan, son of Dmitry). Patriarch Hermogenes, however, called Ivan "little сriminal". Zarutsky was thinking he would have established his position as de facto ruler of the Tsardom of Russia for a long time. He was, however, dethroned, and he and Marina had to flee to Astrakhan.

== Death ==
When Tsar Michael I of Russia was elected, the citizens of Astrakhan wanted the pretender and his family to leave the town. In 1614 an uprising of townspeople was aimed solely at capturing the family. They fled into the steppes to escape. A month later, in May 1614, after failing to gather support for a Cossack uprising, they were captured by the Cossacks near the Yaik River and handed over to the government. Marina was imprisoned in the Kolomna Kremlin tower and Ivan and Zarutsky were brought to Moscow. Zarutsky was impaled. Three-year-old Ivan was publicly hanged on 16 July [O.S. 6 July] 1614 in Moscow, near the Serpukhov Gate. According to one account, he was too light for the drop to break his neck and died slowly of strangulation. Just five months after the deaths of her son and husband, Marina died in prison on Christmas Eve, 24 December 1614.

== Bibliography ==
- Thackeray, Frank W.; Findling, John E. (1999). Events That Changed the World in the Seventeenth Century. Greenwood Publishing Group. ISBN 978-0-313-29078-7.
