= Battle of Bolkhov =

1608 battle in Russia

- Part of Polish–Muscovite War (1605–18)
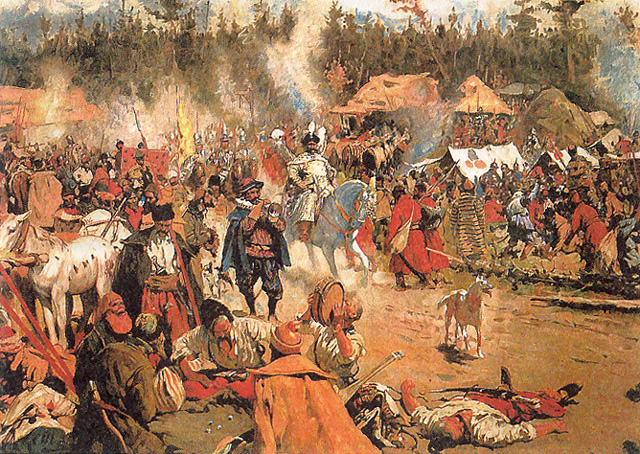
- Camp of False Dmitry II at Tushino
Date	May 10–11, 1608
Location	Kamenka River near Bolkhov
Result	Pretender's victory

Belligerents
False Dmitry II	Muscovite Tsardom

Commanders and leaders
Roman Rozhinsky	Dmitry Shuisky

Strength
About 13,000	No less than 30,000

Casualties and losses
About 2,000	Up to 20,000

In the Battle of Bolkhov on May 10–11, 1608, the troops of False Dmitry II managed to defeat the army of Tsar Vasily Shuisky.

== Prelude ==
From the Tsar's side at least 30 thousand soldiers (5 regiments) were assembled, Streltsy, Cossacks, noble cavalry and German mercenaries (from Livonia), under voevody Dmitry Shuisky and Vasily Golitsyn. On the side of the Pretender was only 13 thousand soldiers under the leadership of Lithuanian Prince Roman Rozhinsky, including almost 6,000 Polish-Lithuanian mercenaries.

== Battle ==
On the first day of battle, the Pretender's cavalry attacked first, consisting of heavy Hussars and Cossack cavalry. The attack was successfully repulsed by the Russian nobleman's cavalry and German mercenaries.

The next day, the frontal attacks of the Polish-Cossack forces were not successful because the Russian leaders placed their troops in a fortified camp. However, a deserter informed the hetman Rozhinsky of the strength of the Russian army, the location of the regiments, and also their unwillingness to fight for Tsar Vasily IV. Rozhinsky moved his reserves into the flank of the Russian army and resorted to cunning, ordering the inclusion of carts in this detachment, putting the battle banners on them, so that Russian soldiers would think that the army of False Dmitri was much larger. This caused confusion in the ranks of government troops, and their front crumbled under attack. The defeated army of Dmitry Shuisky fled.

== Aftermath ==
Part of the government troops (about 5 thousand) was besieged in Bolkhov, but after artillery bombardment surrendered and, recognizing the impostor as their sovereign, joined his army. False Dmitry II had the opportunity to attack Moscow. Kaluga recognized his power without a fight. The army of False Dmitry II came to Moscow and settled in the Tushino camp.
