= Ivan Zarutsky =

Cossack leader (died 1614)

Ivan Martynovich Zarutsky (Russian: Заруцкий, Иван Мартынович, Polish: Iwan Martynowicz Zarucki or Zarudzki) (died 1614) was a Cossack leader in Russia in the early 17th century.

== Biography ==
Zarutsky was born in the city of Ternopol in the 16th century, then part of Poland–Lithuania.

In 1606–1607, ataman Zarutsky and his men took part in the Bolotnikov Uprising. After Ivan Bolotnikov's defeat on the outskirts of Moscow, Zarutsky went to Poland to take the side of "tsar Dmitry" (False Dmitri II) and Polish king Sigismund III Vasa. Zarutsky played an important role in creating the military for False Dmitri II and took part in all of his battles, for which he would be given the title of a "boyar".

After the death of the impostor, Zarutsky married Dmitri's widow Marina Mniszech and set the goal to install her son Ivan on the Russian throne. In January 1611, Zarutsky joined the First People's Volunteer Army, which had been fighting with the Polish invaders in Moscow under the command of Prokopy Lyapunov. Zarutsky organized Lyapunov's assassination and became the leader of the army; however, most of the service class people left it after that. Zarutsky was left with a scanty unit of the Cossacks, who couldn't struggle successfully in small numbers. The leader of the Second People's Volunteer Army, Dmitry Pozharsky, urged the people to unite and not to recognize the authority of Marina Mniszech, her son and Zarutsky.

In 1612, abandoning the siege of Moscow, Zarutsky and his cossacks fled to Kolomna with Marina Mniszech and her son Ivan. In June 1613, Tsar Mikhail Romanov's army confronted the plundering Zarutsky at Voronezh, forcing Zarutsky's retreat to Astrakhan. Zarutsky instigated a reign of terror, which caused a popular uprising, forcing Zarutsky to escape in May 1614. By mid-June, Zarutsky was captured, along with Marina and Ivan. Zarutsky was impaled in Moscow, and the three year old Ivan hanged. Marina was imprisoned in a Kolmna tower, and died soon after.

== Sources ==
- "Заруцкий, Иван Мартынович" . Brockhaus and Efron Encyclopedic Dictionary (in Russian). 1906.
