= Peter Arslanovich Urusov =

Tatar prince

Peter Urusov (Russian: Пётр Арсла́нович Урусов, Turkish: Urak Arslan-oglu) was a Tatar prince who killed False Dmitry II in December 1610. Urusov married Anna Grigoryevna, the former wife of Alexander Shuysky, brother to Tsar Vasily Shuyky. They had a son named Vasily.

== Killing of False Dmitry II ==
On 11 December 1610, Urusov killed False Dmitry II in response to the killing of the Tatar prince Uraz Muhammed who was killed in November of the same year by Dmitry.

The event was described by Hetman Stanisław Żółkiewski in his memoirs:

Having drunk deep at dinner...he ordered a sleigh to be harnessed, taking flasks of mead to the sleigh. Coming out into the open country, he drank with some boyars. Prince Peter Urusov, together with those several score horsemen with whom he was in league, was riding after him, apparently escorting him. And when the imposter had drunk very well with the boyars, Urusov drew from his holster a pistol which he had ready, and galloping up to the sleigh first shot him with the pistol, then cutting off his head and hand with his saber, took to the road.

== Later life ==
After his killing of False Dmitry II, he left Tushino for Crimea, where he served as an advisor to the khans on "Russian issues". In May 1637, Urusov was summoned to the council of Bahadır I Giray, Khan of the Crimean Khanate, where he and two of his sons were killed. This was likely revenge for an attack by the Nogais on the Crimeans, when two of Bahadır's sons were killed.

== See also ==
- False Dmitry II
- Time of Troubles
