= False Dmitry I =

Tsar of Russia from 1605 to 1606

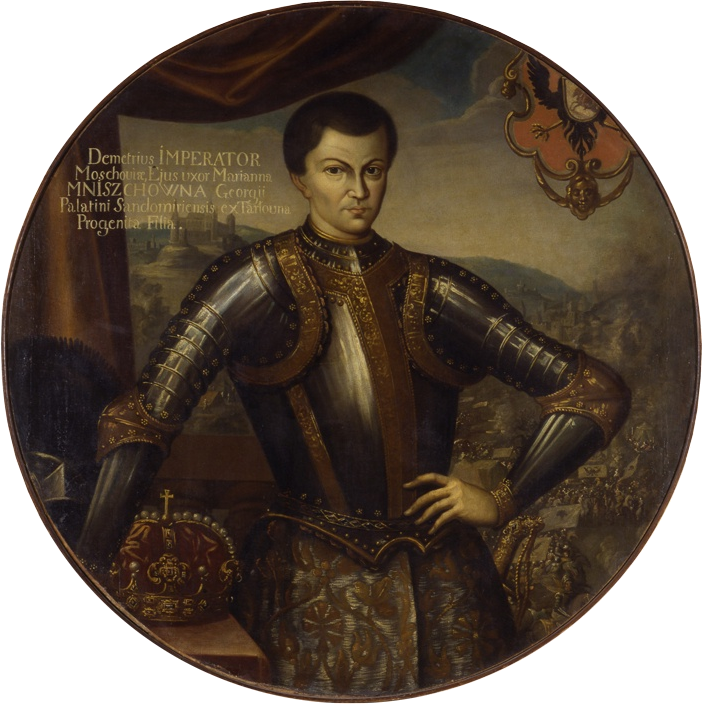
- A portrait of False Dmitry I made in Poland–Lithuania in the early 17th century

Tsar of all Russia
- Reign: 20 June [O.S. 10 June] 1605 – 27 May [O.S. 17 May] 1606
- Coronation: 21 July 1605
- Predecessor: Feodor II
- Successor: Vasili IV
- Born: 19 October 1582 (claimed)
- Died: 17 May 1606 (aged 23); Moscow, Russia
- Spouse: Marina Mniszech
Names
- Dmitry Ivanovich (claimed)
- Dynasty: Rurik (claimed)

False Dmitry I or Pseudo-Demetrius I (Russian: Лжедмитрий I, romanized: Lzhedmitriy I) (Note: Other romanizations include the common Dmitri, as well as Dmitrii, Dimitri, Dimitrii, Dimitriy, and Dimitry.) reigned as the Tsar of all Russia from 10 June 1605 until his death on 17 May 1606 under the name of Dmitry Ivanovich (Russian: Дмитрий Иванович). Dmitry ascended to the throne after the deposition of Tsar Feodor II and ruled for 11 months before he was assassinated in the 1606 Moscow Uprising and replaced with Vasili Shuisky. Dmitry was a pretender who impersonated Dmitry of Uglich, a son of Ivan the Terrible, and his reign formed part of the Time of Troubles.

He was the first, and most successful, of at least three imposters who claimed during the Time of Troubles to be the youngest son of Ivan the Terrible, tsarevich Dmitry Ivanovich, who supposedly escaped a 1591 assassination attempt when he was eight years old. It is generally believed that the real Dmitry of Uglich died in Uglich in 1591. False Dmitry claimed that his mother, Maria Nagaya, anticipated the assassination attempt ordered by Boris Godunov and helped him escape to a monastery in the Tsardom of Russia, and the assassins killed somebody else instead. He said he fled to the Polish–Lithuanian Commonwealth after he came to the attention of Boris Godunov, who ordered him seized. Many Polish nobles did not believe his story, but nonetheless supported him.

With the support of the Polish–Lithuanian Commonwealth, False Dmitry invaded Russia in 1604 with mixed success, and the war later ended with the sudden death of Tsar Boris Godunov. Disaffected Russian boyars staged a coup against the new tsar, Feodor II. False Dmitry entered Moscow on 21 July 1605, and was crowned tsar. Maria Nagaya accepted him as her son and "confirmed" his story. False Dmitry's reign was marked by his openness to Catholicism and allowing foreigners into Russia. This made him unpopular with the boyars, who staged a successful coup and killed him eleven months after he took the throne. Later, another pretender, False Dmitry II, claimed to be False Dmitry having survived the 1606 Moscow Uprising. His wife of 10 days, Marina, would later "accept" Dmitry II as her fallen husband.

According to historian Chester S. L. Dunning, Dmitry was "the only Tsar ever raised to the throne by means of a military campaign and popular uprisings".

== Background ==
Dmitry entered history circa 1600, after making a positive impression on Patriarch Job of Moscow with his learning and assurance. Tsar Boris Godunov ordered the young man seized and questioned. Dmitry fled to Prince Constantine Ostrogski at Ostroh, in the Polish–Lithuanian Commonwealth, and subsequently entered the service of the Wiśniowieckis, a polonized Ruthenian family. The princes Adam and Michał Wiśniowiecki in particular showed interest in the stories Dmitry told, and who he purported to be, as they gave the Poles an opportunity to capitalize on the political rancor in Moscow.

Rumors said that Dmitry was an illegitimate son of the Polish king, Stefan Batory, who reigned from 1575 to 1586. According to a later tale, Dmitry blurted out that identity once, when a violent master slapped him. Dmitry's own story was that his mother, Tsar Ivan's widow, anticipated Boris Godunov's assassination attempt, and put him into the care of a doctor, who hid him in various monasteries through the years. After the doctor died, Dmitry fled to Poland, and worked briefly there as a teacher before he entered the service of the Wiśniowieckis. Some who had known Ivan IV later claimed that Dmitry did indeed resemble the young tsarevich. The young man also possessed such aristocratic skills as horsemanship and literacy, and was fluent in Russian, Polish, and French.

Whether or not Dmitry's tale was accurate, the Wiśniowiecki brothers, Samuel Tyszkiewicz, Jan Sapieha, Roman Różyński, and several other Polish noblemen agreed to back him, and his claim, against Boris Godunov.

In March 1604, Dmitry visited the court of Sigismund III Vasa in Kraków. The king provisionally supported him, but did not promise any military help. To attract the powerful Jesuits to his cause, Dmitry publicly converted to Roman Catholicism on 17 April 1604, and convinced papal nuncio Claudio Rangoni to also back his claim.

While at court, Dmitry met Marina Mniszech, daughter of Polish nobleman Jerzy Mniszech. Dmitry and Marina fell in love. When he asked her father for her hand, he was promised it in return for granting the Mniszechs full rights to the Russian towns of Pskov, Novgorod, Smolensk, and Novhorod-Siverskyi upon his ascension.

== Russian throne ==
Boris Godunov received word of Dmitry's Polish support, and spread claims than the younger man was simply a runaway monk called Grigory Otrepyev (Russian: Григорий Отрепьев, born Yuri Otrepyev; "Grigory" was the name given to him at the monastery). The basis for this claim remains unknown. But Tsar Boris's public support began to wane, especially as Dmitry's loyalists spread counter-rumors. Several Russian boyars also pledged themselves to Dmitry, thereby giving themselves a "legitimate" reason to not pay taxes to Tsar Boris.

== Invasion of Russia ==
In October 1604, Dmitry crossed the Desna, a river which at the time formed part of the border between Russia and Poland-Lithuania, marking the start of his invasion. Dmitry, having gained the full support of the Polish Commonwealth, formed a small army of approximately 3,500 soldiers from various private Polish and Lithuanian forces. Boris's many enemies, including the southern Cossacks, joined Dmitry's army on the long march to Moscow. These combined forces fought two engagements with reluctant Russian soldiers. Winning the first, they captured Chernigov (modern Chernihiv), Putivl (Putyvl), Sevsk, and Kursk, but they badly lost the second battle. Despite these successes, the true turning point in the war was the sudden death of Tsar Boris.

Afterwards, Boris's son Feodor was crowned Tsar, but since he was just sixteen, he was "unable to retain the loyalty of even the passive acceptance of the Russian elite for very long", and on 1 June, the disaffected boyars of Moscow staged a palace coup and imprisoned him along with all members of the Godunov clan. On the same day the boyar council declared Tsar Feodor deposed and proclaimed its support for Tsar Dmitry.

On 20 June, Dmitry made his triumphal entry into Moscow with 8,000 Cossacks and Poles (according to Isaac Massa), and on 21 July a new Muscovite Patriarch of his own choosing, the Greek Ignatius of Moscow, crowned him as tsar.

== Reign ==
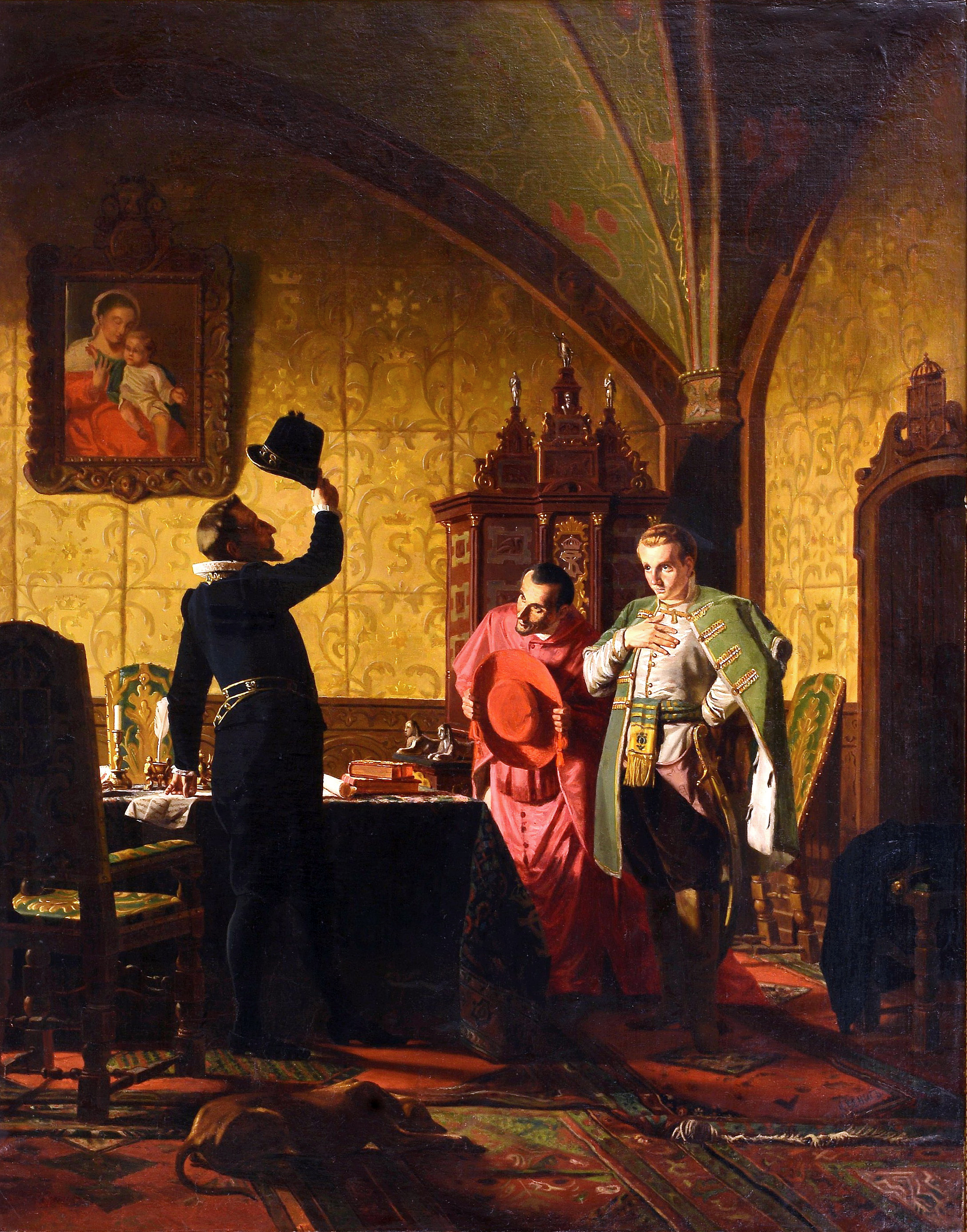
False Dmitry takes an oath of allegiance to king Sigismund III Vasa by Nikolai Nevrev (1874)

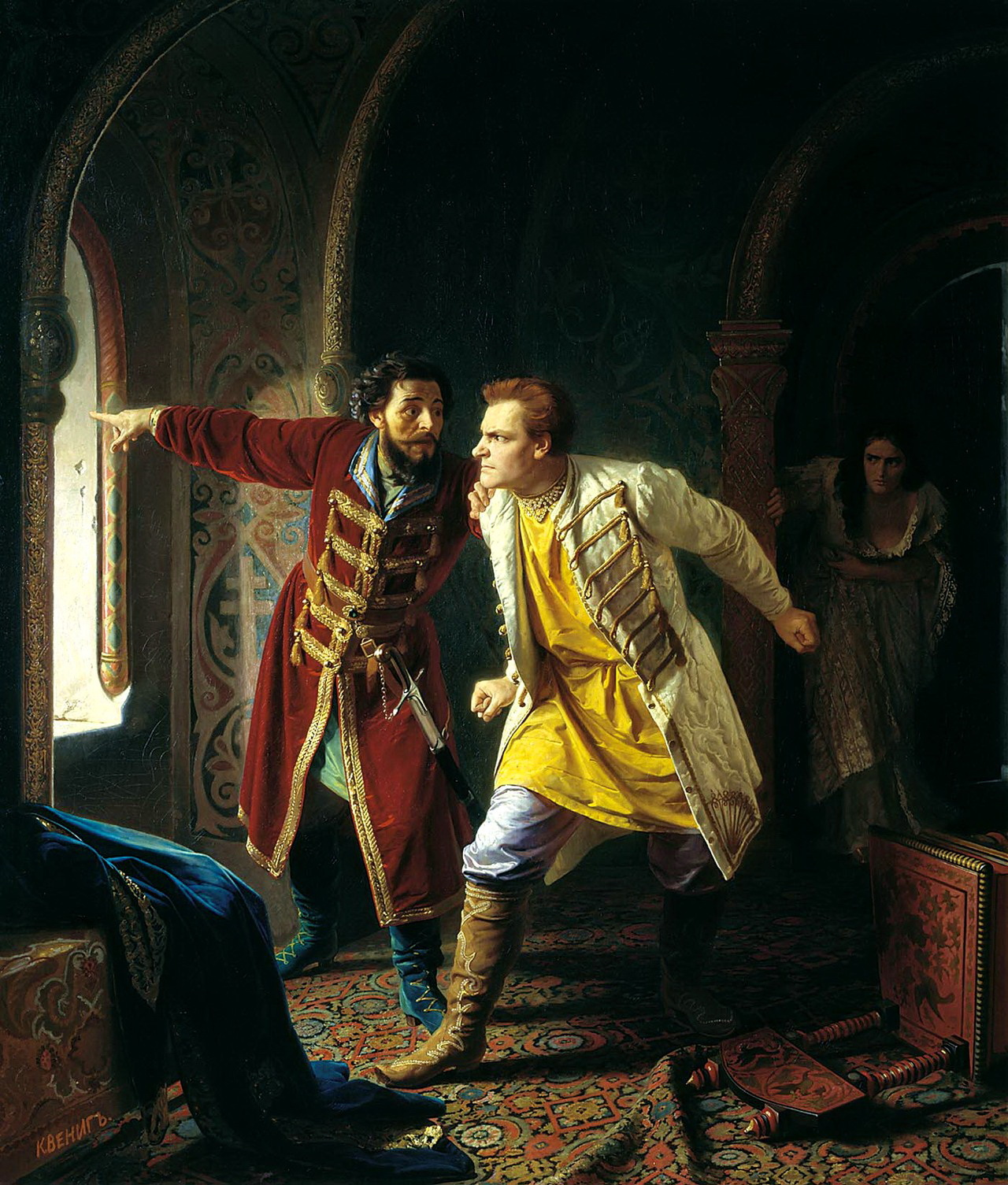
Last minutes of False Dmitry by Carl Wenig (1879).

The new tsar moved to consolidate his power by visiting the tomb of Tsar Ivan, and the convent of his widow Maria Nagaya, who accepted him as her son and "confirmed" his story. The Godunovs were killed, including Tsar Feodor and his mother, with the exception of Tsarevna Xenia, whom Dmitry allegedly raped and kept as a concubine for five months. Many of the noble families Tsar Boris had exiled – such as the Shuiskys, Golitsins and Romanovs – were pardoned and allowed to return to Moscow. Feodor Romanov, sire of the future imperial dynasty, was soon appointed as metropolitan of Rostov; the old patriarch Job, who did not recognize the new tsar, was sent into exile.

Dmitry planned to introduce a series of political and economic reforms. He restored Yuri's Day, the day when serfs were allowed to change their allegiance to another lord, easing the conditions of peasantry. His favorite at the Russian court, 18-year-old Prince Ivan Khvorostinin, is considered by historians to be one of Russia's first Westernizers.

In foreign policy, Dmitry sought an alliance with his sponsor, the Polish Commonwealth, and with the Papal States. He planned for war against the Ottoman Empire, ordering mass production of firearms to prepare for the conflict. In his correspondence, he referred to himself as "Emperor of Russia" a century before Tsar Peter I used the title, although this was not recognized at the time. Dmitry's royal depictions featured him clean-shaven, with slicked-back dark hair, an unusual look for the era.

On 8 May 1606, Dmitry married Marina Mniszech in Moscow; she was Catholic. When a Russian Tsar married a woman of another faith, the usual practice was that she would convert to Eastern Orthodox Christianity. Rumors circulated that Dmitry had obtained the support of Polish King Sigismund and Pope Paul V by promising to reunite the Russian Orthodox Church and the Holy See; so, claimed the rumors, Tsarina Marina did not convert to the Orthodox faith. This angered the Russian Orthodox Church, the boyars, and the population alike.

The resentful Prince Vasily Shuisky, head of the boyars, began to plot against the tsar, accusing him of spreading Roman Catholicism, Lutheranism, and sodomy. This gained traction and popular support, especially since Dmitry surrounded himself with foreigners who flouted Russian customs — something the conservative Russian society of the time could not accept. According to Russian chronicler Avraamy Palitsyn, Dmitry further enraged many Muscovites by permitting his Catholic and Protestant soldiers, whom the Russian Church regarded as heretics, to pray in Orthodox churches.

Shuisky's adherents had spread word that Tsar Dmitry was about to order his Polish retainers to lock the city gates and massacre the people of Moscow. Whether such orders existed or not, Palitsyn's chronicle reported them as undeniable fact.

== Death ==
On the morning of 17 May 1606, ten days after Dmitry's marriage to Marina, huge numbers of boyars and commoners stormed the Kremlin. Dmitry tried to flee by jumping out a window, but fractured his leg in the fall. He fled to a bathhouse and tried to disappear within. But he was recognized and dragged out by the boyars, who killed him lest he successfully appeal to the crowd. His body was hacked to pieces, burned, and then the ashes fired from a cannon towards Poland. According to Palitsyn, Dmitry's death set off a massacre of his supporters. He boasted in his chronicle that "a great amount of heretical blood was spilled on the streets of Moscow."

Dmitry's reign had lasted only eleven months before Prince Shuisky took his place. Two further impostors later appeared, False Dmitry II and False Dmitry III, the first of whom was publicly "accepted" by Tsarina Marina as her fallen husband.

== Portrayals in literature ==
- False Dmitry is one of the primary characters in Alexander Pushkin's blank verse drama Boris Godunov. Pushkin's character is a young novice monk who impersonates the Tsarevich after he learns he is the age the child would have been had he lived. Pushkin's decision to humanise the False Dmitry earned him the disapproval of Emperor Nicholas I of Russia, who prevented the play from being published or staged. In an unpublished foreword, Pushkin wrote, "There is much of Henri IV in Dmitri. Like him he is brave, generous and boastful, like him indifferent to religion -- both abjure their faith for a political cause, both love pleasures and war, both devote themselves to chimerical projects, both are victims of conspiracies... But Henri IV didn't have a Ksenya [Xenia] on his conscience -- it is true that this horrible accusation hasn't been proved and, as for me, I make a point of not believing it." Pushkin intended to write further plays about the reigns of Dmitry and Vasili, as well as the subsequent Time of Troubles. Pushkin was prevented from fulfilling these plans by his death in a duel at the age of 37.
- Although based on Pushkin's play, Modest Mussorgsky's opera of the same name demonizes False Dmitry, the Polish people, and the Roman Catholic Church. False Dmitry's engagement to Marina Mniszech is portrayed as instigated by a Jesuit. Marina balks at seducing the pretender, and the Jesuit threatens her with hellfire until she grovels at his feet. In contrast, Pushkin believed that Marina was motivated by pathological ambition. At the opera's denouement, the pretender's ascent to the throne is lamented by the holy fool Nikolai, who appears in Pushkin's play only to rebuke Tsar Boris for murdering the real Dmitry. In Mussorgsky's opera, the holy fool proclaims, "Weep, weep Orthodox soul", and predicts that "the enemy will come" leading to "darkness blacker than night."
- False Dmitry's story was also told by Schiller (in Demetrius), Sumarokov, Khomyakov, by Victorin Joncières in his opera Dimitri, and by Antonín Dvořák in his opera Dimitrij.
- Rainer Maria Rilke recounts the overthrow of False Dimitry in The Notebooks of Malte Laurids Brigge, Rilke's only longer prose work.
- Harold Lamb fictionalizes the demise of False Dimitry in "The Wolf Master", in which the claimant survives his assassination through trickery, and flees east, pursued by a Cossack he had betrayed.
- A false Dmitry features in the second story of The Ninth Doctor Adventures: Back to Earth (Volume 2.1), a boxset of Doctor Who audio dramas from Big Finish Productions. In that story the False Dmitry is under the control of aliens who wish to conquer Russia and then the world with a robot army.

== See also ==
- Bibliography of Russian history (1223–1613)
- Ivan Bolotnikov
- Isaac Massa
- Polish–Muscovite War (1605–18)
  - Battle of Novhorod-Siverskyi
  - Battle of Dobrynichi
  - Siege of Kromy
- Šćepan Mali
- Tsars of Russia family tree

== Notes ==
Regnal titles
Preceded by Feodor II	Tsar of Russia; 1605–1606	Succeeded by Vasili IV
