= Marina Mniszech =

Tsaritsa of Russia in 1606

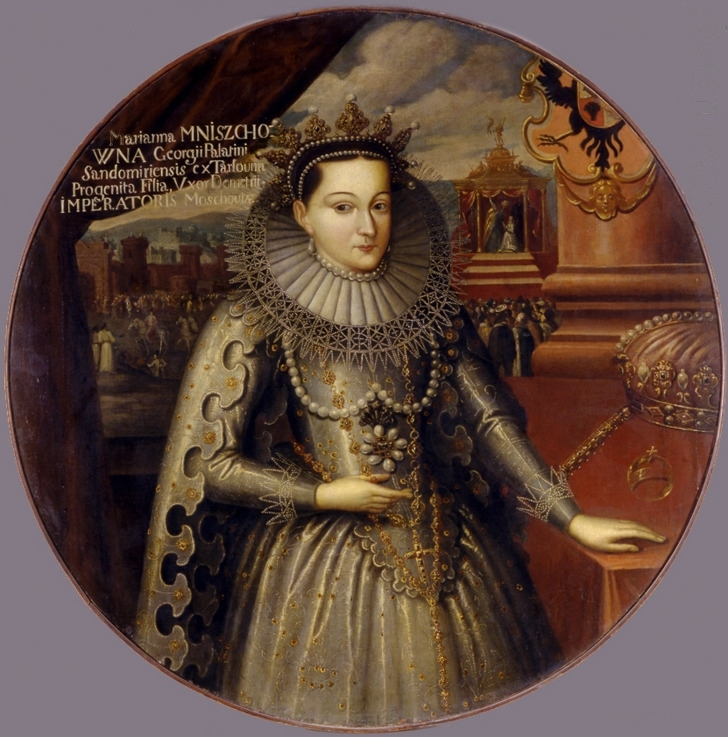
- Official portrait, early 17th century

Tsaritsa consort of all Russia
- Tenure: 18 May [O.S. 8 May] 1606 – 27 May [O.S. 17 May] 1606
- Coronation: 18 May [O.S. 8 May] 1606
- Predecessor: Maria Skuratova-Belskaya
- Successor: Maria Buynosova-Rostovskaya
- Born: 1588; Laszki Murowane, Crown of the Kingdom of Poland
- Died: 24 December 1614 (aged 25–26); Kolomna Kremlin, Tsardom of Russia
- Spouses: False Dmitriy I; False Dmitriy II; Ivan Zarutsky
- Issue: Ivan Dmitriyevich
Names
- Maryna Mniszech
- House: Mniszech
- Father: Jerzy Mniszech
- Mother: Jadwiga Tarło-Mniszech
- Religion: Roman Catholicism

Marina Mniszech or Mnishek (Polish: Maryna Mniszech, IPA: [maˈrɨna ˈmɲiʂɛk]; Russian: Марина Мнишек, IPA: [mɐˈrʲinə ˈmnʲiʂɨk]; c. 1588 – 24 December 1614) was a Polish noblewoman who was the tsaritsa of all Russia in May 1606 during the Time of Troubles as the wife of False Dmitry I. Following the death of her husband, she later married another imposter to the throne, False Dmitry II. A devout Catholic, she hoped to convert Russia's population to Catholicism.

== Life ==
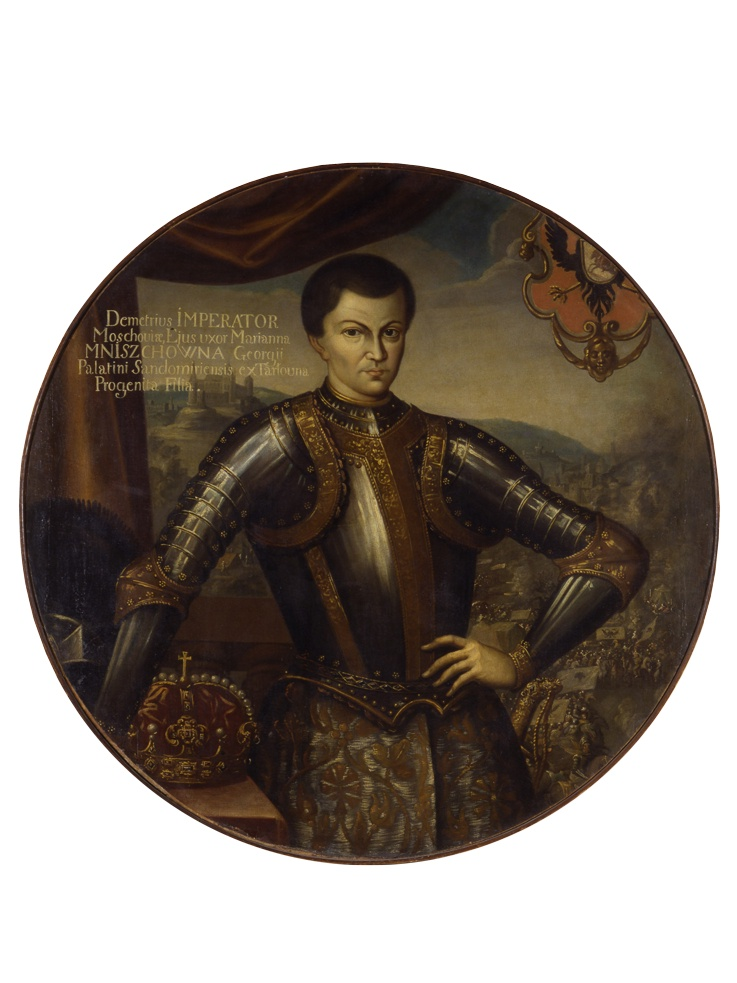
Official portrait of False Dmitry I

Marina Mniszech was a daughter of Jadwiga Tarło and Polish Voivode-Governor of Sandomierz Jerzy Mniszech, who was one of the organizers of the Dimitriads, which were instigated by the appearance of a man who claimed to be Ivan the Terrible's son. Marina Mniszech's marriage to False Dmitriy I provided an opportunity for the Polish magnates to control their protégé. Mniszech met False Dmitry I around 1604 or 1605, at the court of one of the Commonwealth magnates, and was betrothed to him. In return for her hand Dmitri promised her Pskov and Novgorod, and her father Smolensk and Severia. After the death of Boris Godunov, Dmitri captured Moscow in June 1605. In November he sent a diplomatic mission to Poland, asking for Marina's hand and proposing a military alliance to defeat the Ottoman Empire.

=== Tsaritsa ===
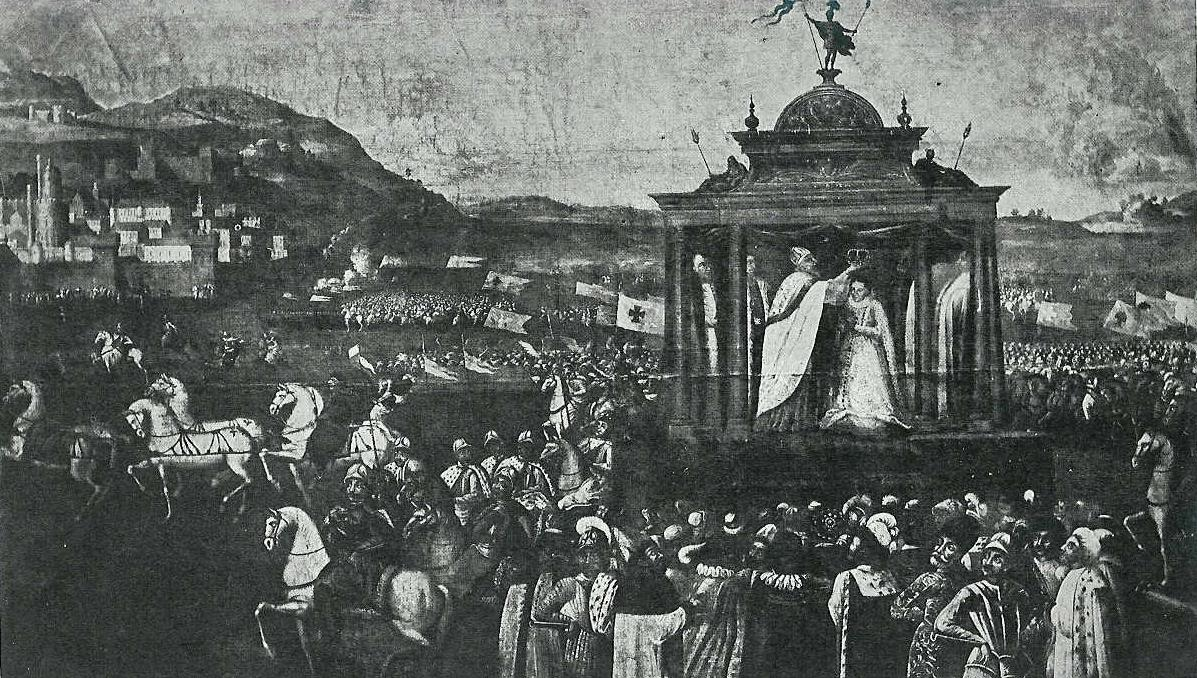
Coronation of Maryna Mniszech in Moscow by Tommaso Dolabella.

The first wedding ceremony, performed in November 1605 by the Bishop of Kraków, Cardinal Bernard Maciejowski was held per procura in Kraków, at the Montelupi complex (Pod Jaszczurami and Firlejowska) and was attended by the Polish king Sigismund III Vasa himself, as well as hundreds of high-ranking szlachta members and foreign guests. Dmitri was represented by Muscovite envoy Afanasy Vlasiev. Afterwards, Marina went with her father and a retinue of approximately 4,000 to Moscow. At the beginning of May 1606, Marina entered Moscow in a triumphant parade, and on 8 May was crowned in Ascension Cathedral when Patriarch Ignatius confirmed their marriage and put the Rurikid crown on her head. It is unknown whether Marina converted from Catholicism to Orthodoxy. She wore a Polish wedding dress, and Dmitri wore the armor of a Polish hussar.

However, Marina did not reign long. On the morning of 17 May 1606, about two weeks after the coronation, conspirators opposed to Dmitri and his policy of close cooperation with Poland stormed the Kremlin. Dmitri tried to flee through a window but broke his leg in the fall. One of the plotters shot him dead on the spot. At first the body was put on display, then cremated and the ashes were shot from a cannon towards Poland. Dmitri's reign had lasted a mere ten months. Vasili Shuisky, whom Dmitri earlier pardoned for conspiring against him, took his place as Tsar. This coup d'état caused thousands of deaths, including many from the Polish entourage. Marina and her father Jerzy Mniszech were imprisoned. However, the story of the False Dmitri was just beginning.

=== Later life ===
After the death of False Dmitry I, Marina Mniszech was spared her life – after she had rejected her royal title – and sent back to Poland in July 1608. However, her father Jerzy Mniszech didn't give up on his plan to become father-in-law of the Tsar. Exiled to Yaroslavl, he searched for a way to regain his favours. With his help, Marina turned up in Tushino, where she would secretly marry another impostor, False Dmitry II, after supposedly recognizing him as her husband. Polish hetman Stanisław Żółkiewski wrote in his memoirs that the only two things False Dmitris I and II had in common was that "they were both human and usurpers". False Dmitry II was killed in December 1610.

Marina Mniszech then found herself a protector in the person of ataman Ivan Zarutsky, who would try to support the nomination of her son Ivan (born in January 1611) for the Russian throne. In the summer of 1613, after having lost their supporters, Mniszech and Zarutsky fled to Astrakhan but with the election of Michael Romanov as tsar, the citizens of Astrakhan wanted the pretender and his family gone from their city. In 1614, an uprising of townspeople was aimed solely at capturing the family and they fled into the steppes. Near the Yaik River in May 1614, after failing to gather support for a Cossack uprising, they were captured by the Cossacks and handed over to the new Tsar the following month.

Ivan Zarutsky and Mniszech's little son were executed in 1614. Marina Mniszech died in prison in Kolomna Kremlin fortress, soon afterwards. According to some sources, she was found strangled.

== In popular culture ==
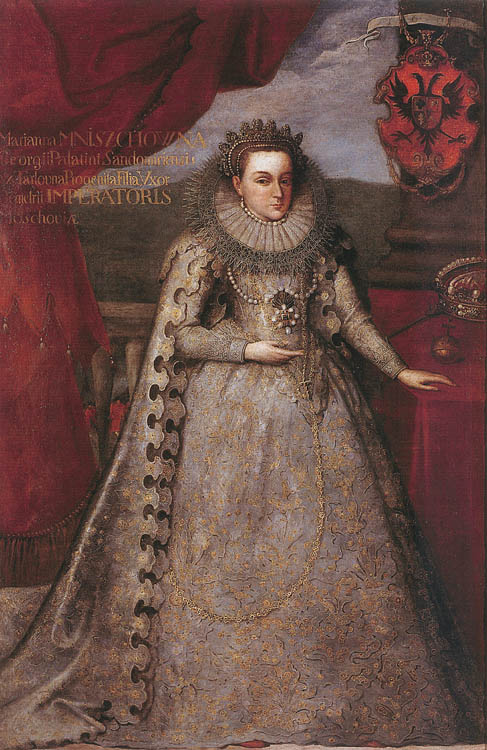
Marina Mniszech in coronation robes, 1606.

Marina Mniszech appears as a character in Alexander Pushkin's blank verse drama Boris Godunov and Modest Mussorgsky's opera of the same name. Although both depict Marina's impending marriage to False Dmitriy I, the depictions of the future Tsaritsa are quite different. Pushkin wrote, "A tragedy without love attracted my imagination. But apart from love entering a great deal into the character of my adventurer, I made Dmitri fall in love with Marina to make the strange character of the latter stand out better. It is barely outlined in Karamzin. But certainly, she was an odd and pretty woman. She had only one passion and that was ambition, but with such a degree of energy, or fury, that it is difficult to imagine it. Look how having sampled royalty, drunk on a dream, she prostitutes herself to one adventurer after another -- shares now the disgusting bed of a Jew, now the tent of a Cossack, always ready to give herself to whoever can show her a faint hope of a throne which no longer exists. Look at her brave war, poverty, shame, at the same time negotiating with the King of Poland like one crowned head to another, and then end her most stormy and most extraordinary existence so miserably. I have only one scene for her, but I will return to her if God lets me live long enough. She upsets me like a violent emotion. She is horribly Polish, as Mme. Lubomirska's cousin said."

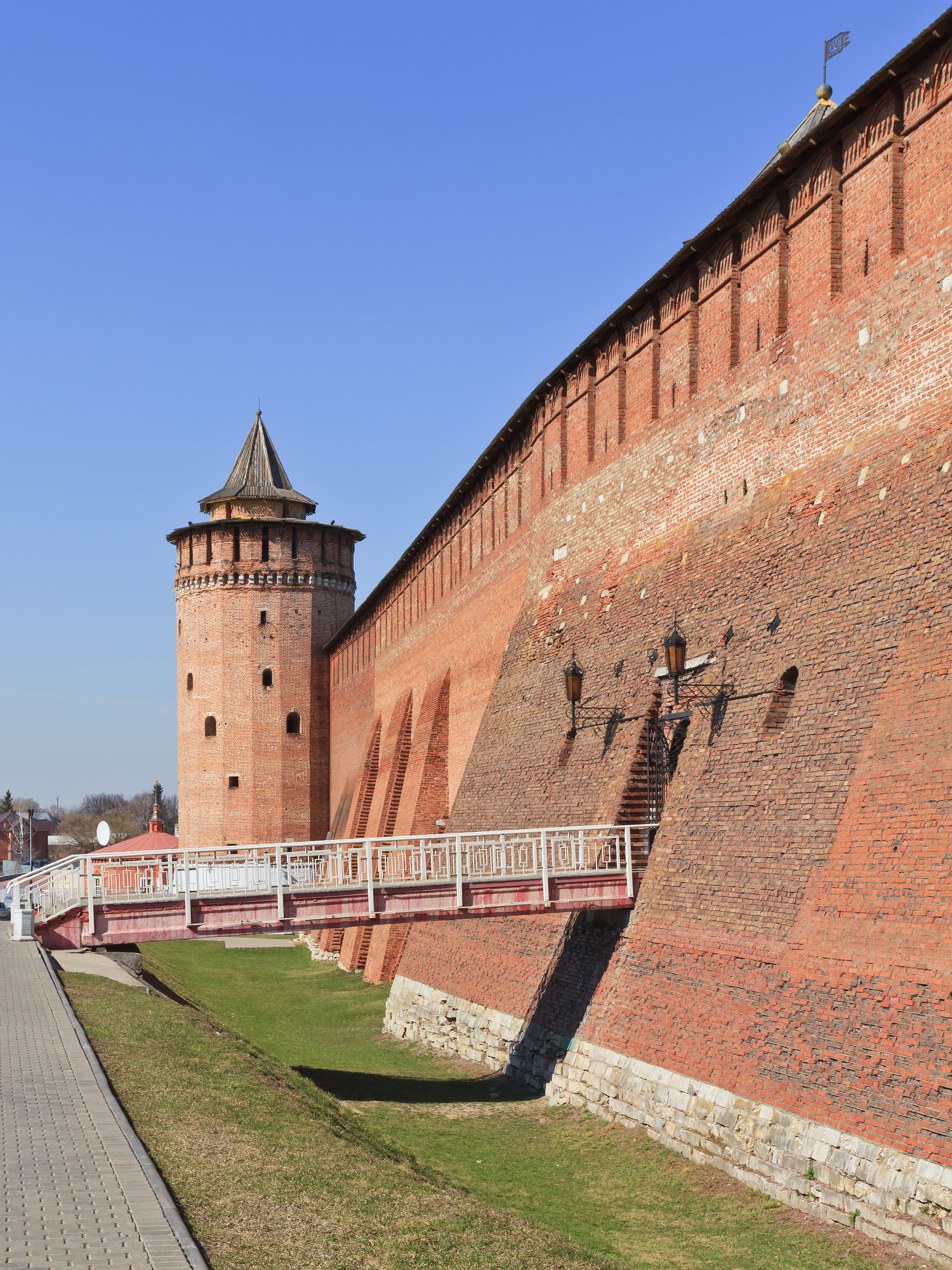
Marinkina Tower in the Kolomna Kremlin where Mniszech died

In Mussorgsky's opera, however, Marina Mniszech's ambitious manipulation of her future husband is shown to be instigated by a Jesuit priest Ercole Rangoni, who eventually threatens her with hellfire unless she seduces the pretender. Then Rangoni informs False Dmitry about Marina coming to the garden and secretly being in love with him [with False Dmitry]. The pretender confesses his feelings but the proud Marina rejects the love of a "daring vagabond", and promises to share his feelings only after he becomes a tsar to make her a tsaritsa of all Russia.

== In folklore ==
When Marina's three-year-old son, Tsarevich Ivan Dmitriyevich, was publicly hanged, Marina – according to the Russian ambassador to the Polish royal court – “died of longing for her own fate”. According to other sources, she either was hanged or was drowned.

A popular legend in Russian folklore has it that Mnishek, a powerful witch known as Marinka the Witch, put a curse on the Romanov dynasty because of the execution of her son by the new Tsar Mikhail and his father, Patriarch Filaret of Moscow. The boy's body had been left hanging near the Serpukhov Gate for months. Marina said: "Damn you! In the Ipatiev's [Monastery] you started, in the Ipatiev's [House] you will end! You began with the death of a tsarevich, you will end with the death of a tsarevich!" Thus, according to the legend, the murder of Tsar Nicholas II and his family, including his thirteen-year-old son, Alexei, was Marinka the Witch's revenge for the public execution of her tsarevich-son.

== See also ==
- Urszula Mayerin
- Elżbieta Sieniawska
- Izabela Czartoryska

== Sources ==
- "Мнишек, Марина" . Brockhaus and Efron Encyclopedic Dictionary (in Russian). 1906.

Marina Mniszech Mniszech Born: 1588 Died: 1614
Russian royalty
Vacant Title last held by Maria Grigorievna Skuratova-Belskaya	Tsaritsa of Russia; 1605–1606	Vacant Title next held by Maria Buynosova-Rostovskaya
