= False Dmitry II =

Pretender to the Russian throne

Dmitry Ivanovich
- Pretender
- Born: 19 October 1582 (claimed)
- Died: 21 December 1610 (aged 28) (Note: His birthdate is claimed so he may not have been 28 when he died.)
- Title(s): Pretended Tsar of Russia
- Throne(s) claimed: Russia
- Pretend from: 1607
- Connection with: Claimed to be Dmitri Ivanovich, (Note: Also known as Dmitry of Uglich) half brother of Feodor I and False Dmitry I.
- Father: Ivan IV (claimed)
- Mother: Maria Nagaya (claimed)
- Spouse: Marina Mniszech
- Children: Ivan Dmitriyevich
- Predecessor: False Dmitry I
- Successor: False Dmitry III, False Dmitry IV (Note: False Dmitry IV was active around the same time as False Dmitry III and may just be False Dmitry III because of bad record keeping.) or Ivan Dmitriyevich

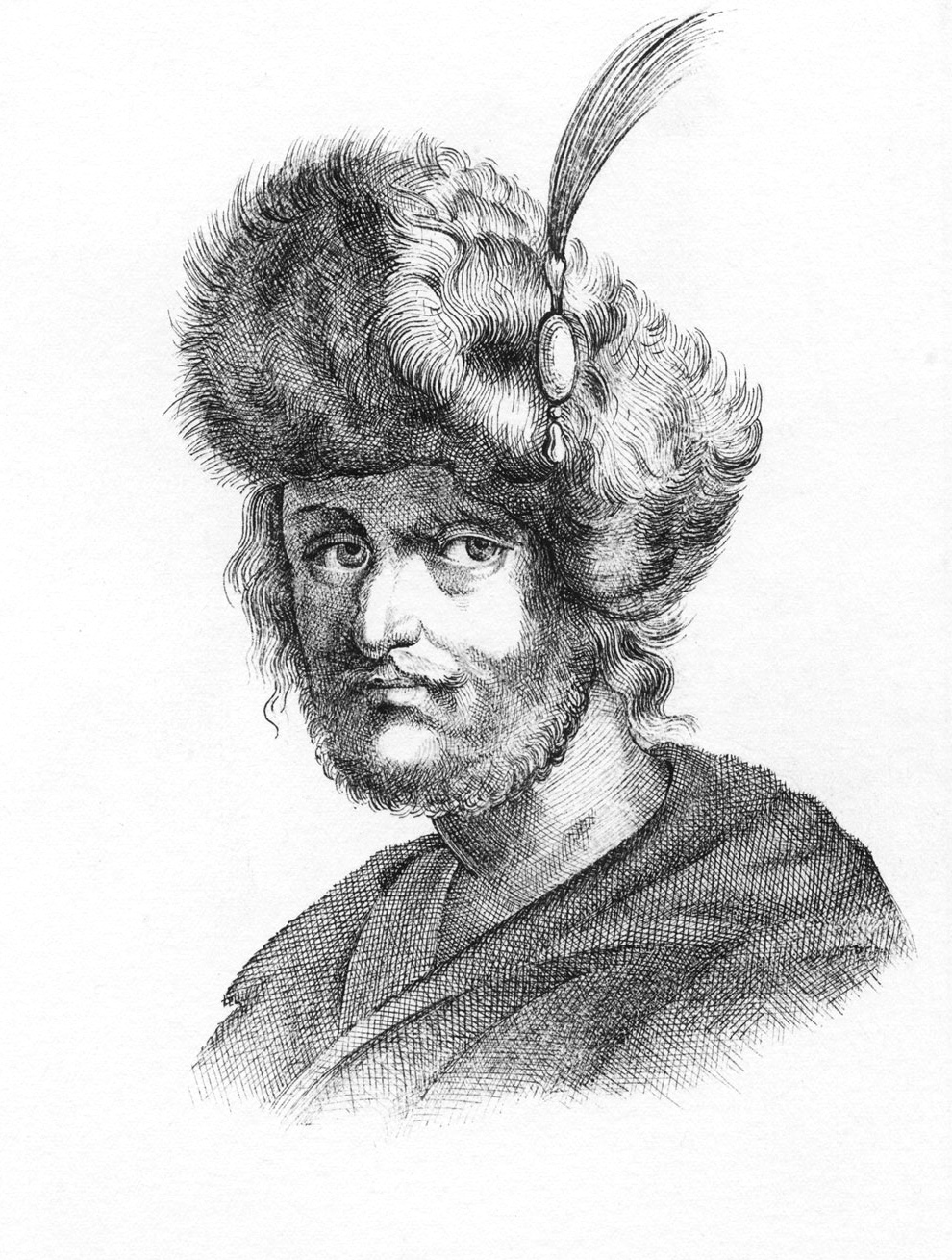
A 17th-Century depiction of Cyrus the Great is often misinterpreted as a portrait of False Dmitry II.

False Dmitry II (Russian: Лжедмитрий II, romanized: Lzhedmitrii II; died 21 December [O.S. 11 December] 1610), (Note: Other romanizations of his name include Dmitri, Dmitrii, and Dmitriy.) historically known as Pseudo-Demetrius II and also called tushinsky vor ("the thief of Tushino"), was the second of three pretenders to the Russian throne during the Time of Troubles who claimed to be the youngest son of Ivan the Terrible, Tsarevich Dmitry Ivanovich. The real Dmitry had died under uncertain circumstances, most likely an assassination in 1591 at the age of nine at his widowed mother's appanage residence in Uglich.

== Biography ==
The second False Dmitry first appeared on the scene around 20 July 1607, at Starodub. He is believed to have been either a priest's son or a converted Jew, and was relatively highly educated for the time. He spoke both the Russian and Polish languages and was something of an expert in liturgical matters. He pretended at first to be the Muscovite boyar Nagoy, but falsely confessed under torture that he was Tsarevich Dmitry, whereupon he was taken at his word and joined by thousands of Cossacks, Poles, and Muscovites.

The historian Chester Dunning states, "According tradition, the future 'Tsar Dmitry' was at the time of his 'discovery' a priest's servant and teacher who lived for some time in the town of Shklov in Belorussia." In the winter of 1606–1607, unemployed and reduced to begging, Pan Miechowikci noticed the beggar looked similar to Dmitry, and eventually convinced the beggar to learn the role of the deceased prince. In May 1607, accompanied by two aides, the impostor crossed the border and made his way to Starodub.

In 1608, following a peace agreement with King Sigismund, Tsar Vasilii agreed to release the father-in-law of False Dmitry I, Jerzy Mniszech, and his widow, Marina Mniszech. They soon joined the second false Dmitry's camp in Tushino, where she "recognized" her late husband in this second Dmitry. According to Dunning, "On the Tushino impostor's boyar council sat such powerful men as Mikhail G. Saltykov and Dmitrii Trubetskoi. They were soon joined by several of Tsar Dmitry's former courtiers, including Grigorii Shakhovskoi and Mikhail Molchanov. The Saltykov and Romanov families were by far the most influential Russians in Tushino. The arrival in Tushino of Jan Piotr Sapieha with seven thousand cavalrymen in August sped up rebel military activity."

Dmitry quickly captured Karachev, Bryansk, and other towns, was reinforced by the Poles, and in the spring of 1608 advanced upon Moscow, routing the army of Tsar Vasili Shuisky at Bolkhov. Promises of wholesale confiscation of the estates of the boyars drew many common people to his side. The village of Tushino, twelve versts from the capital, was converted into an armed camp where Dmitry gathered his army. His force initially included 7,000 Polish soldiers, 10,000 Cossacks and 10,000 other rag-tag soldiers, including former members of the failed Zebrzydowski Rebellion. His forces soon exceeded 100,000 men. He raised to the rank of patriarch another illustrious captive, Philaret Romanov, and won the allegiance of the cities of Yaroslavl, Kostroma, Vologda, Kashin and several others.

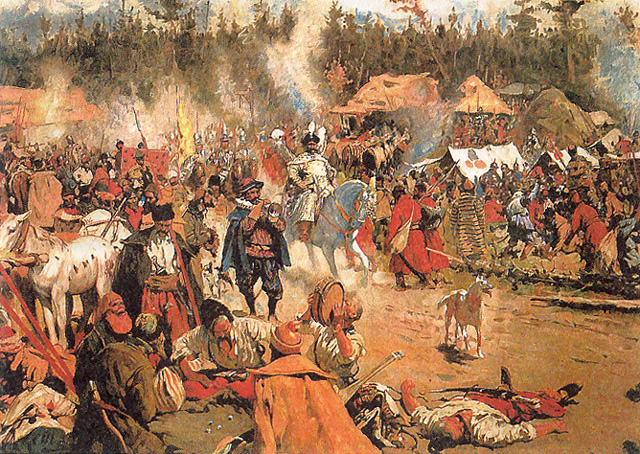
Dmitry's camp at Tushino, by Sergey Ivanov.

The arrival of King Sigismund III Vasa at Smolensk caused a majority of Dmitry's Polish supporters to desert him and join with the armies of the Polish king. At the same time, a strong Russo-Swedish army under Mikhail Skopin-Shuisky and Jacob De la Gardie approached Tushino, forcing him to flee his camp disguised as a peasant and go to Kostroma, where Marina joined him and he lived once more in regal state. He made another unsuccessful attack on Moscow, and, supported by the Don Cossacks, recovered a hold over all south-eastern Russia.

Dmitry was killed, while half drunk, on 11 December 1610 by a Tatar princeling, Peter Urusov, whom he had imprisoned as he knew Dmitry had killed Uraz-Muhammad Khan. Hetman Stanisław Żółkiewski described this event in his memoirs: (Note: Żółkiewski had never met Dmitry, but relied on the information from his many sources. In his memoirs he also wrote that if False Dmitry II had anything in common with False Dmitry I, it was that they were both human beings.)

Having drunk deep at dinner ... he ordered a sleigh to be harnessed, taking flasks of mead to the sleigh. Coming out into the open country, he drank with some boyars. Prince Peter Urusov, together with those several score horsemen with whom he was in league, was riding after him, apparently escorting him. And when the imposter had drunk very well with the boyars, Urusov drew from his holster a pistol which he had ready, and galloping up to the sleigh first shot him with the pistol, then cutting off his head and hand with his saber, took to the road.

== See also ==
- False Dmitry I
- False Dmitry III
- Šćepan Mali
