= Dmitry of Uglich =

Russian tsarevich (1582–1591)

Dmitry Ivanovich
- Tsarevich of Russia
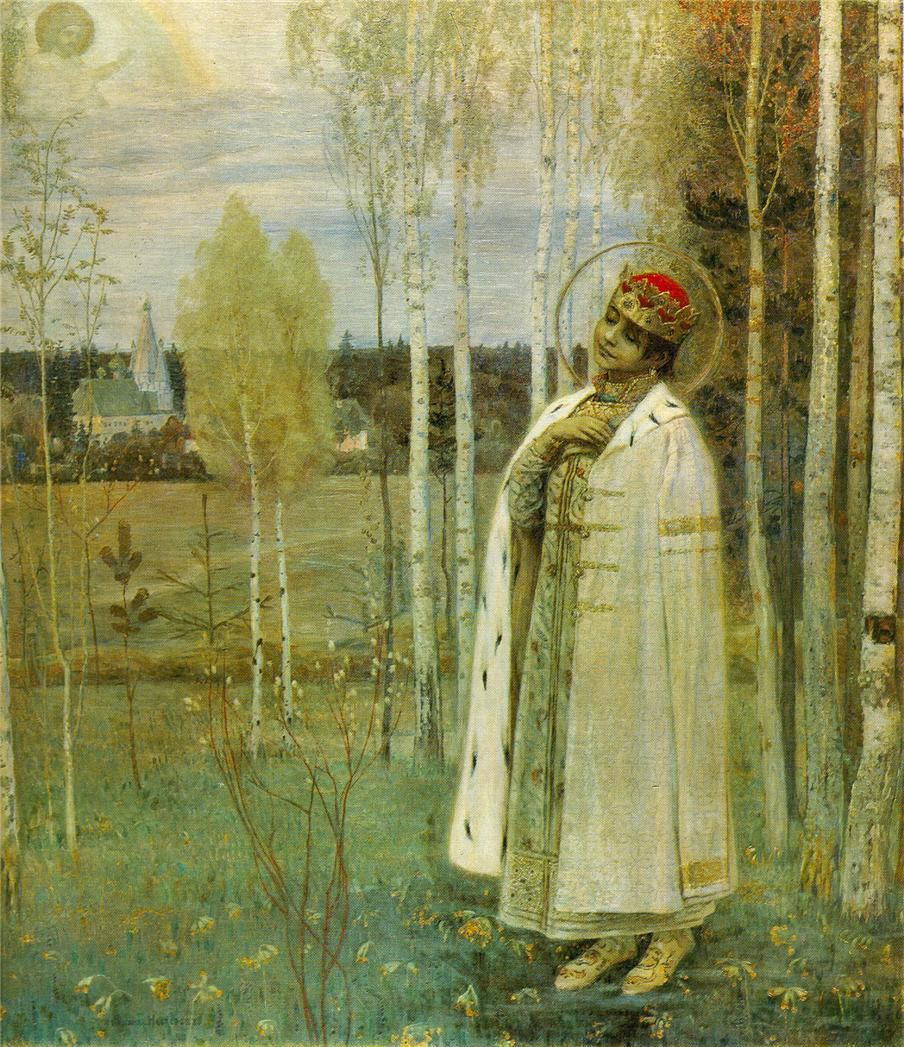
- Tsarevich Dmitry by Mikhail Nesterov (1899)
- Born: 29 October [O.S. 19 October] 1582; Moscow, Russia
- Died: 15 May 1591 (aged 8); Uglich, Russia
- Burial: Cathedral of the Archangel, Moscow
- House: Rurik
- Father: Ivan IV of Russia
- Mother: Maria Nagaya
- Religion: Russian Orthodox

Saint Dmitry of Uglich
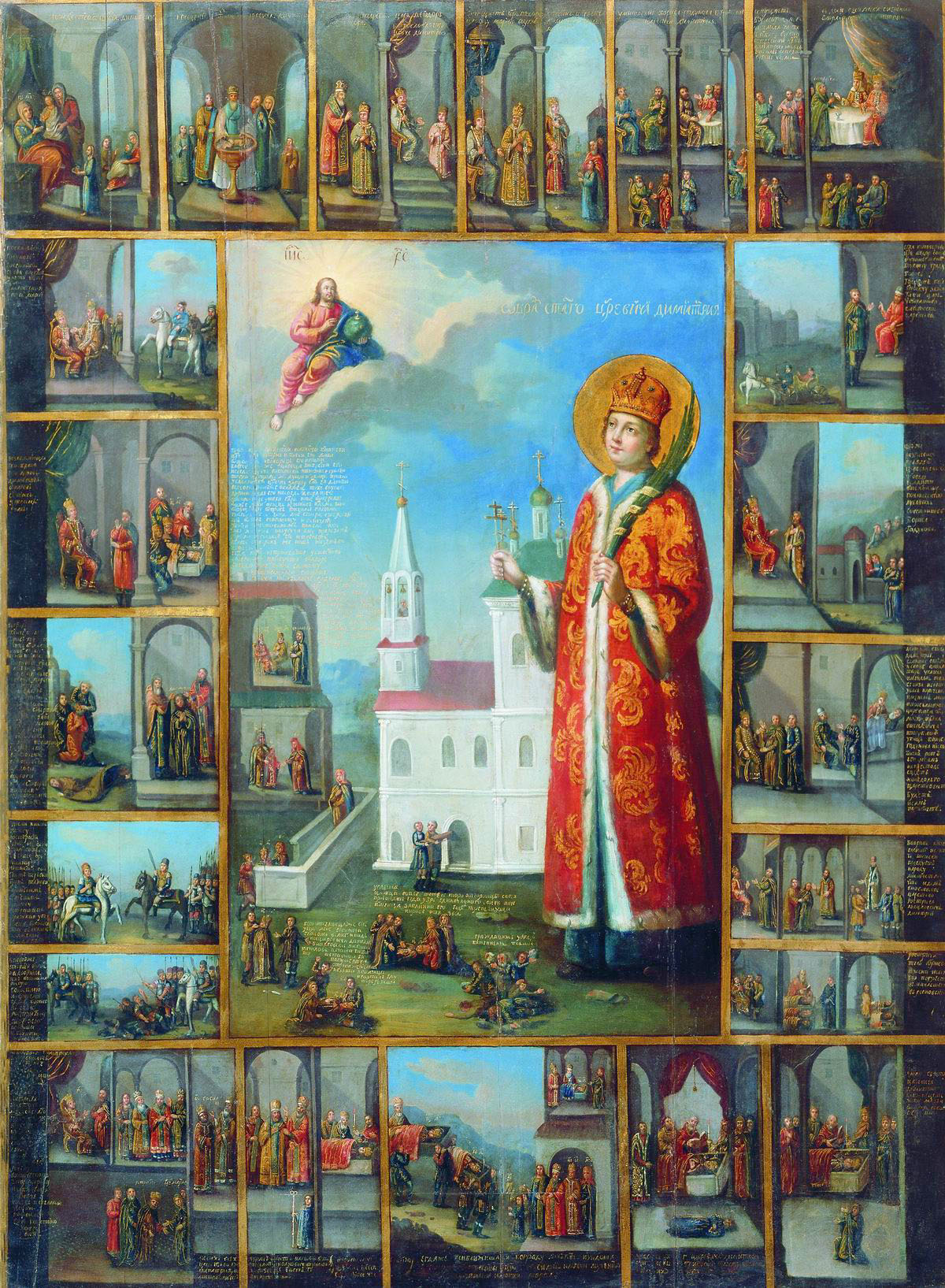

the Wonderworker, Slain Crown Prince or Pious Crown Prince
- Venerated in: Eastern Orthodox Church
- Feast: May 15/ 28

Dmitry Ivanovich (Russian: Дмитрий Иванович; 29 October [O.S. 19 October] 1582 – 15 May 1591) was the youngest son of Russian tsar Ivan the Terrible. He was the tsarevich (heir apparent) for close to seven years of his half-brother Feodor I's reign (though his legitimacy as an heir could have been contested by the Russian Orthodox Church). After his death, he was impersonated by a number of imposters to the throne, during the Time of Troubles.

== Life ==
Dmitry was the youngest son of Ivan the Terrible by his last wife Maria Nagaya, and their only child together. Ivan died in 1584, and was succeeded by Dmitry's older brother, Feodor I. Feodor was sickly and weak, and the country was governed by a regency council. This was headed from 1586 by Boris Godunov, Feodor's brother-in-law and Malyuta Skuratov's son-in-law.

In 1584, Godunov sent Dmitry, and his mother and her brothers, into internal exile in the tsarevich's appanage of Uglich. On 15 May 1591, Dmitry died there under mysterious circumstances.

As a result, when Feodor I died childless in 1598, Dmitry, the only other possible Rurikid heir, was also dead, and Godunov claimed the throne.

It was widely believed at the time that Godunov got rid of Dmitry to clear the way for his own eventual succession.

== Death theories ==
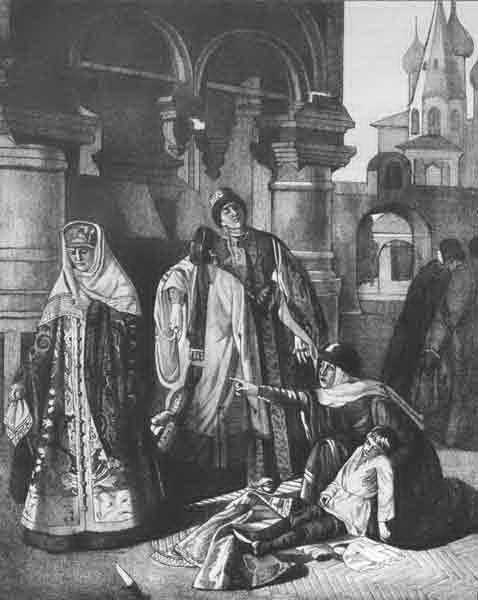
Depiction of Dmitry's death by Pavel Pleshanov

Russian chroniclers and later historians offered two possible scenarios of what could have happened to Dmitry. The first theory is that Dmitry was killed by order of Boris Godunov, the assassins making it look like an accident (this version was supported by the prominent 19th-century historians Nikolai Karamzin, Sergei Soloviev, Vasily Klyuchevsky and others). Critics of this version point out that Dmitry was Ivan's son from his last marriage, and thus illegitimate by Russian Orthodox canon law, which allows a maximum of three marriages. This would make any claim of Dmitry's for the throne dubious at best. Modern scholarship tends to exonerate Boris of any role in the prince's death.

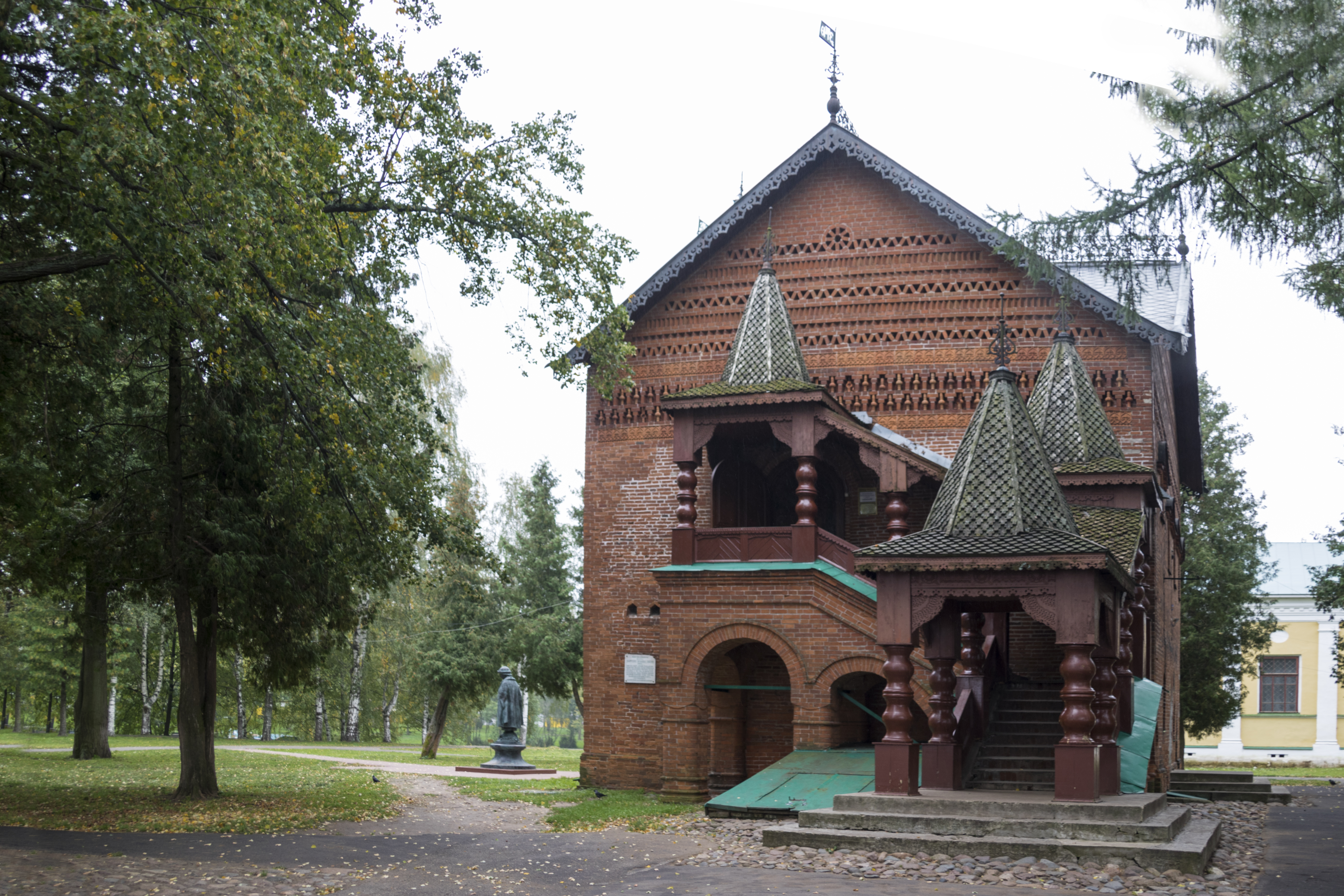
Palace in Uglich Kremlin, where Dmitry died

The second theory is that Dmitry stabbed himself in the throat during an epileptic seizure, while playing with a knife (this version was supported by historians Mikhail Pogodin, Sergei Platonov, Vladimir Klein, Ruslan Skrynnikov and others). The detractors of this scenario assert that, since during an epileptic seizure the palms are wide open, the self-infliction of a fatal wound becomes highly unlikely. However, the official investigation, done at that time, asserted that the tsarevich's seizure came while he was playing a svaika game or with a knife (v tychku) and thus holding the knife by the blade, turned toward himself. With the knife in that position, the version of self-inflicted wound on the neck while falling forward during seizure appears more likely.

There is also a third version of Dmitry's fate, which found support with some earlier historians, such as Konstantin Bestuzhev-Ryumin, Ivan Belyaev, and others. They considered it possible that Godunov's people had tried to assassinate Dmitry, but killed somebody else instead and he managed to escape. This scenario explains the appearance of impostors, sponsored by the Polish nobility (see False Dmitry). However, most modern Russian historians consider the version of Dmitry's survival improbable, since it is hardly possible that the boy's appearance was unknown to his assassins. Also, it is well known that many Polish nobles who supported False Dmitry I did not believe his story themselves.

== Aftermath ==
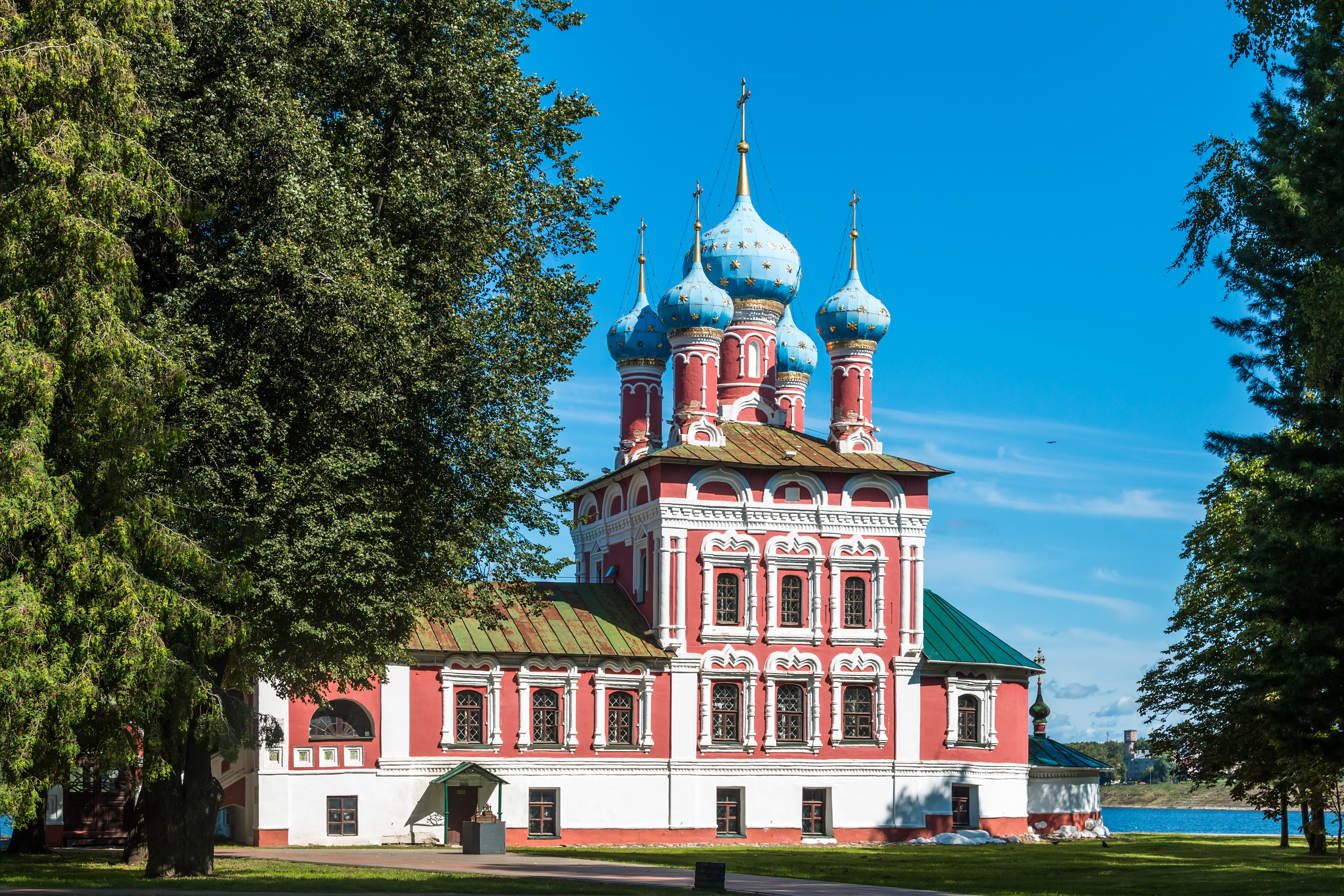
The Church of St. Demetrius on Blood in Uglich commemorates his death

The death of the tsarevich roused a riot in Uglich, instigated by the loud claims of Dmitry's mother Maria Nagaya and her brother Mikhail that Dmitry was murdered. Hearing this, enraged citizens lynched 15 of Dmitry's supposed "assassins", including the local representative of the Moscow government (dyak) and one of Dmitry's playmates. The subsequent official investigation, led by Vasily Shuisky, after a thorough examination of witnesses, concluded that the tsarevich had died from a self-inflicted stab wound to the throat. Following the official investigation, Maria Nagaya was forcibly tonsured as a nun and exiled to a remote convent.

However, when the political circumstances changed, Shuisky retracted his earlier claim of accidental death and asserted that Dmitry was murdered on Boris Godunov's orders. On 3 June 1606, Dmitry's remains were transferred from Uglich to Moscow and his cult soon developed. In the calendar of the Russian Orthodox Church, he is venerated as a "Saint Pious Tsarevitch", with feast days of 19 October, 15 May and 3 June. In the 20th century, some Russian and Soviet historians have given more credit to the conclusions of the first official investigation report under Shuisky, which ruled Dmitry's death to be an accident.

== Cultural references ==
The story of murder is presumed in Aleksandr Pushkin's play Boris Godunov, made into an opera by Modest Mussorgsky.

== Bibliography ==
- Sergey Platonov. Очерки по истории смуты в Московском государстве XVI-XVII вв. Moscow, 1937.
- Ruslan Skrynnikov. Лихолетье. Москва в XVI-XVII веках. Moscow, 1988.

Russian royalty
Preceded by Feodor I	Heir to the Russian throne 1584–1591	Succeeded by Feodor II
