= Tushino =

Former town, now area of Moscow

Coordinates: 55°49′53″N 37°26′24″E

Tushino (Russian: Тушино, IPA: [ˈtuʂɨnə]) is a former village and town to the north of Moscow, which has been part of the city's area since 1960. Between 1939 and 1960, Tushino was classed as a separate town. The Skhodnya River flows across the southern part of Tushino.

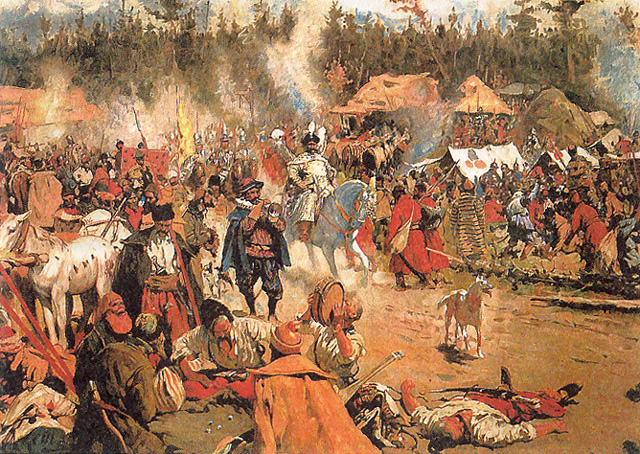
The camp at Tushino, by Sergey Ivanov.

== History ==
The village was attested since the late 14th century as an estate of boyar Vasili Ivanovich Kvashnin-Tusha and later his sons Pyotr and Semyon. In the middle of the 16th century, the village and the nearby Saviour Monastery were acquired by the Troitse-Sergiyeva Lavra. One of the finest of Russian tent-like churches was built in the monastery under Ivan the Terrible.

In the late 16th century, the monastery used to provide lodging for foreign diplomatic missions before their arrival in Moscow. During the Time of Troubles, False Dmitry II and his supporters settled in Tushino between 1608 and 1610. The Tushino camp was a replica of the Muscovite court, having its own prikazes and the Patriarch. From here, False Dmitry II laid siege to the Moscow Kremlin.

In December 1609, the "тушинский вор" ("rebel/criminal of Tushino") (as the impostor came to be known) and his wife Marina Mniszech fled from Tushino to Kaluga after losing Polish support. In 1610, the combined Russo-Swedish army of Mikhail Skopin-Shuisky and Jacob de La Gardie forced False Dmitry's supporters out of Tushino. Thereafter the monastery was disbanded, and the village declined.

In the second half of the 19th century, Tushino saw the first industrial enterprises, such as windmills and a textile mill. In the 1920s, they built Tushino Stocking Factory. In 1929, the Soviets established a flying school of the Osoaviakhim (Осоавиахим, which is short for the Society for Support of the Defense, Aviation, and Chemical Industries) and then Tushino Airfield with research facilities and aircraft factories next to Tushino.

The Tushino workers took an active part in the revolutionary movement: people's militia was created in 1905 and made an unsuccessful attempt to take over a train with weapons during the December fighting in Moscow (12 December). After the suppression of the uprising, a Cossack punitive expedition was sent to Tushino. In October 1917, local workers supported the Bolsheviks and the slogan "All Power to the Soviets". At the Tushino-Guchkov Council Workers' and Soldiers' Deputies, a revolutionary committee was created, which with the help of the Red Guards seized control of the vicinity of the station; a significant number of local Red Guards took part in the October fighting in Moscow. 104 people were sent to Moscow from "Explorer" (factory). 17 Red factory Hutareva (ex. Suvirovoy) in Bratsevo returned after the fighting and found the factory gates closed. They arrested the owner, who fled. The result, however, was that in the early 20s until collectivization, factories did not work, except for Brattsevskoy.

A flight school was founded near Tushino in 1929, followed by a glider factory in 1930.

== See also ==
- Soviet air shows, for which Tushino airfield was notable

== Online references ==
- South Tushino authority
- North-West District of Moscow
- Tushino airfield at Google maps
