= Uprising of Bolotnikov =

Major uprising against the boyars in Moscow kingdom

- Part of Time of Troubles
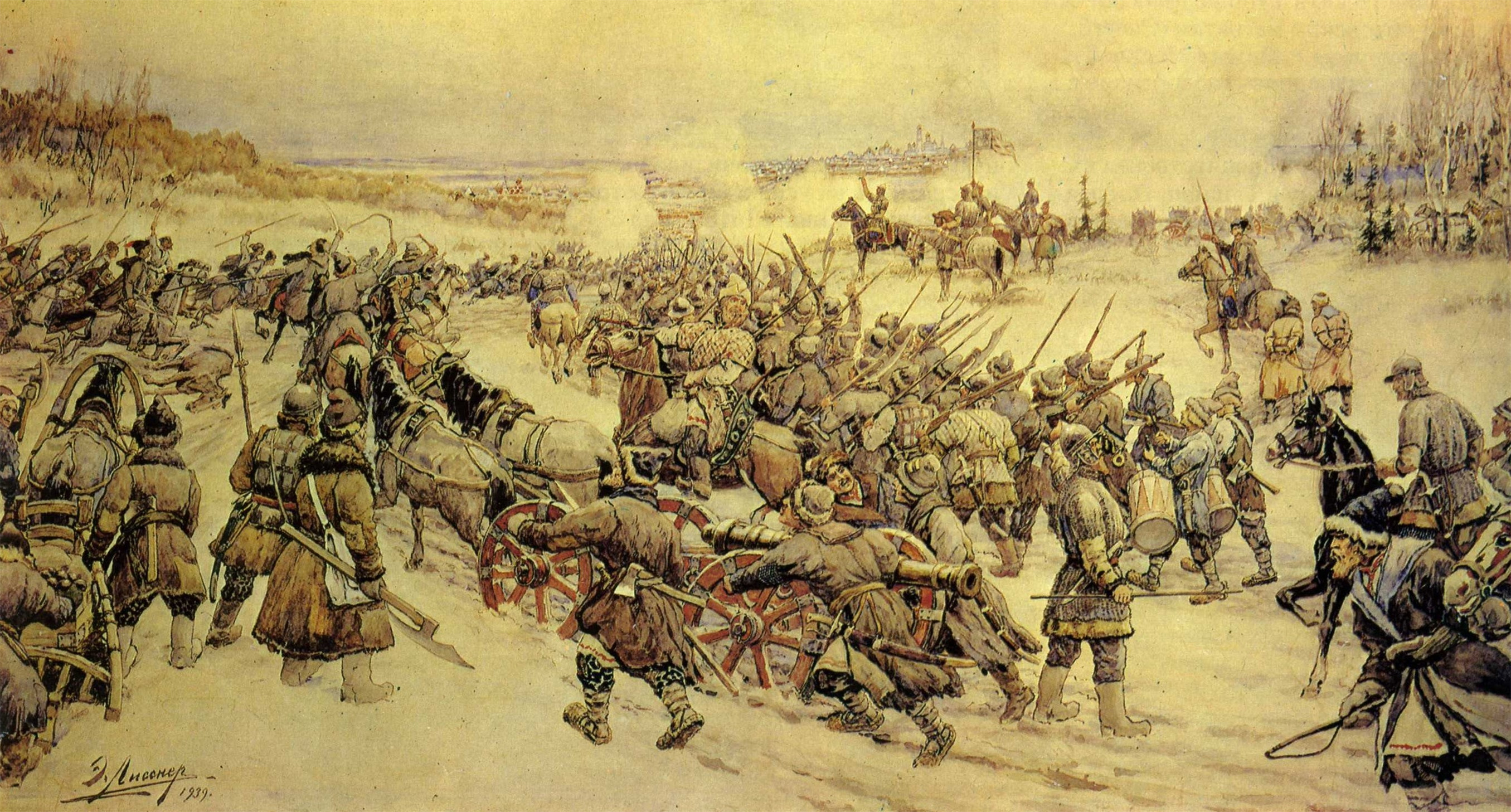
- Ernest Lissner. The beginning of the battle of Bolotnikov's troops with the tsar's troops near the village of Nizhniye Kotly near Moscow
Date	1606–1607
Location	Wild Field, the southern part of Central Russia
Result	Suppression of rebellion

Belligerents
Russian Kingdom	Rebels (supporters of False Dmitry): Don Cossacks; Volga Cossacks; Terek Cossacks; Ukrainian Cossacks; Service People; Posad People; Peasants (serfs and black-ploughing); Foreign mercenaries (Polish-Lithuanian and German)

Commanders and leaders
Vasily IV Shuisky; Fedor Mstislavsky; Yuri Trubetskoy; Ivan Vorotynsky; Ivan Shuisky; Dmitry Shuisky; Artemy Izmailov; Mikhail Skopin-Shuisky; Mikhail Shein; From the end of 1606: Philip (Istoma) Pashkov †; Grigory Sunbulov; Prokopy Lyapunov	Ivan Bolotnikov (executed); Grigory Shakhovskoy (surrendered); Andrey Telyatevsky (surrendered); Ilya Korovin (Ileika Muromets, False Peter) †; Yuri Bezzubtsev (surrendered); Until the end of 1606: Philip (Istoma) Pashkov; Grigory Sunbulov; Prokopy Lyapunov

Strength
From 50–60 to 100 thousand or more people	Up to 25–30 thousand people

The Uprising of Bolotnikov, in Russian historiography called the Peasant War under the Leadership of Ivan Bolotnikov (Peasant Uprising), was a major peasant, Cossack, and noble uprising of 1606–1607 led by Ivan Bolotnikov and several other leaders. At the time of the highest point of the uprising (the Siege of Moscow in 1606), more than 70 cities in the south and center of Russia were under the control of the rebels.

== Causes ==
By the end of the 16th century, serfdom was forming in Russia. The discontent of the peasants, caused by the intensification of feudal oppression, was expressed in the uprisings of the monastery peasants at the end of the 16th century, the mass exodus to the southern regions during the famine of 1601–1603. In 1603 there was a major uprising of slaves and peasants under the command of Khlopko Kosolap.

After the death of False Dmitry I, rumors spread around Moscow that it was not Dmitry who was killed in the palace, but someone else. These rumors made Vasily Shuisky's position very precarious. There were many dissatisfied with the boyar king, and they grabbed the name of Dmitry. Some – because they sincerely believed in his salvation; others – because only this name could give the fight against Shuisky a "legitimate" character.

The enslavement of the peasants, the introduction of the "fixed years" by Fyodor Ioannovich, political instability, hunger – as a result of this, the uprising was clearly anti-boyar.

== Participants in the uprising ==
- Peasants and slaves (Ivan Bolotnikov);
- Seversky Cossacks (sevryuki);
- Terek, Volga, and Zaporozhye Cossacks (Ileika Muromets);
- Ryazan (Prokopy Lyapunov), Tula (Istoma Pashkov), and Seversky (Andrei Telatevsky) nobility;
- A hired army of 10 thousand Landsknechts with artillery.

In total, 30 thousand rebels took part in the March to Moscow. Thus, the uprising can be considered a civil war, since all sectors of society of that time participated. However, the participation of mercenary troops and the presence of aristocracy commanders and the fact that events occurred shortly after the fall of False Dmitry I implies the possibility of Polish intervention.

== Beginning of the uprising ==
The Don Cossack Ivan Bolotnikov was a military servant of Prince Andrey Telatevsky. Returning through Europe from Turkish captivity, he was in Sambor (in the castle of Yuri Mnishek) introduced to a certain person who called himself "Tsar Dmitry Ivanovich". Apparently, this was the adventurer Mikhail Molchanov, an associate of False Dmitry I, who had fled from Moscow and who now sent "royal letters" to the south of Russia, sealed with a gold tsar seal that he had stolen in Moscow. The letters announcing the imminent return of Tsar Dmitry were perceived by many as completely reliable. An experienced warrior, Bolotnikov was appointed "great governor" in Sambor and sent to Putivl to Prince Grigory Shakhovsky, who began to raise the Seversky Land against Tsar Vasily Shuisky.

Andrei Telyatevsky, the Chernigov governor, whom Bolotnikov had previously served, also sympathized with the uprising. Dozens of cities and fortresses in southwestern Russia began to quickly separate from Shuisky.

== Campaign to Moscow ==
Tsar Shuisky sent troops led by governors Yuri Trubetskoy and Ivan Vorotynsky to fight the rebels. In August 1606, the army of Trubetskoy was defeated by the rebels in the battle of Kromy; in the battle of Yelets, the army of Vorotynsky was defeated. On October 3, 1606, Bolotnikov won the battle near Kaluga, where the main forces of the Shuisky army were concentrated.

The rebels on their way to Moscow came to Kolomna. In October 1606, Kolomna's posad was seized by them, but the Kremlin continued to stubbornly resist. Leaving a small portion of his forces in Kolomna, Bolotnikov headed along the Kolomenskaya road to Moscow. In the village of Troitskoye, Kolomenskoye Uyezd, he managed to defeat government troops. Bolotnikov's army was located in the village of Kolomenskoye near Moscow.

On October 7, 1606, Bolotnikov's army besieged Moscow. In November, the Cossacks of Ileika Muromets joined the uprising, but on November 15 Ryazan's raties of Lyapunov switched to the side of Shuisky. This was partly due to the stratification of the rebels into Cossacks and nobles, and partly due to the active agitation of the patriarch Germogen against the rebels. The Shuisky government managed to convince the Muscovites that if the Bolotnikites took the city, they would be punished for the murder of False Dmitry I, so the townspeople were determined. On December 2, weakened rebels were defeated and retreated to Kaluga (Bolotnikov) and Tula (Ileika Muromets).

== Siege of Kaluga ==
On December 20, the tsarist army besieged the rebels in Kaluga. At the beginning of 1607, a large detachment of Cossacks came to the aid of the rebels. Other forces of the rebels, belonging to Ileika Muromets and the prominent figures of the uprising connected with him, tried to break through the siege from the outside. Their struggle with government forces was with varying success. In the battle of Venev, Prince Andrei Telyatevsky, who joined the rebels, was able to win, but then the royal governors defeated the "thieves" in the battles on Vyrka and near Silver Ponds. The rebels compensated for these defeats with victories in the battle of Tula and the battle of Dedilov. However, their biggest success at this stage of the uprising was the Battle of Pchelna in May 1607. It was the result of the second campaign of the rebel forces in Kaluga, undertaken by Ileika Muromets in order to help the besieged Bolotnikov. At the head of the army, marching to Kaluga, was placed Prince Telatevsky. After that, Bolotnikov lifted the siege of Kaluga on a sortie against the demoralized tsarist regiments.

However, soon the army of Bolotnikov, marching to join with the units of False Peter in Tula, suffered a major defeat in the battle of the Vosma. This allowed the tsarist forces to take a decisive campaign on Tula.

== Defense of Tula ==
Bolotnikov is surrendered before the Tsar Vasily Shuisky. Unknown artist

On June 22, 1607, the royal troops approached the walls of the rebellious Tula. On July 10, Tsar Vasily Shuisky took personal leadership of the siege of Tula. The situation of the besiegers was complicated by the fact that the Pretender appeared in Starodub, who moved his armies to help the "Tula sitters". On October 20, 1607, the Tula Kremlin was taken by Shuisky. During the siege, the tsarist troops blocked the Upa River flowing through the city with a dam and caused a flood in the city. The idea of such a siege method was suggested to Shuisky by boyar Ivan Kravkov, from whom Bolotnikov requisitioned large food supplies. The rebels tried to blow up the dam, but the same Kravkov warned Shuisky, and the attempt failed.

Bolotnikov was exiled to Kargopol, blinded and drowned. Ileiko Muromets – hanged. Voivode Shakhovskoy – forcibly tonsured to a monk. According to legend, Vasily Shuisky promised "not to shed blood" of rebels who agreed to surrender. In order to formally keep his promise, he then used the "bloodless" method of execution – through drowning – with reprisals against the rebels.

== Reasons of defeat ==
Lack of unity in the ranks of his troops. The uprising was attended by people from different walks of life and they all pursued their own goals; lack of a unified ideology; betrayal of the troops.

The nobility pretty soon switched to the side of Shuisky; underestimation of enemy forces. Bolotnikov often forced events, not giving the army the opportunity to accumulate strength.

== Aftermath ==
Despite the suppression of the uprising, the Time of Troubles in Russia did not end. The surviving "thieves" of Bolotnikov joined the rebel army of False Dmitry II coming from Starodub and joined the Tushino camp. Subsequently, these "thieves" took part in the First (Prokopy Lyapunov) and the Second Militias (Grigory Shakhovskoy).

== Sources ==
- The Uprising of Ivan Bolotnikov. Documents and Materials / Compiled by Alexander Kopanev and Arkady Mankov – Moscow, 1959
- Alexander Zimin. To the Study of the Bolotnikov Uprising // Problems of the Socio-Political History of Russia and Slavic Countries. Collection of Articles Dedicated to the 70th Anniversary of Academician Mikhail Tikhomirov – Moscow, 1963
- Alexander Zimin. Some Questions of the History of the Peasant War in Russia at the Beginning of the 17th Century // Questions of History. 1958. No. 3
- Vadim Koretsky. From the History of the Peasant War in Russia at the Beginning of the 17th Century // History. 1959. No. 3
- Vadim Koretsky. New Documents on the History of the Uprising of Ivan Bolotnikov // Soviet Archives. 1968. No. 6
- Peasant Wars in Russia of the 17th–18th Centuries – Moscow, Leningrad, 1966
- Peasant Wars in Russia 17th–18th Centuries. Problems, Searches, Solutions / Editor-in-Chief Lev Cherepnin – Moscow, 1974
- Daniil Makovsky. The First Peasant War in Russia – Smolensk, 1967
- About the Peasant War in the Russian State at the Beginning of the 17th Century. (Review of the Discussion) // Questions of History. 1961. No. 5
- Reginald Ovchinnikov. Some Questions of the Peasant War of the Beginning of the 17th Century in Russia // Questions of History. 1959. No. 7
- Sergey Platonov. Essays on the History of Turmoil in the Moscow State – Moscow, 1937
- Sklar. About the Initial Stage of the First Peasant War in Russia // Questions of History. 1960. No. 6
- Ivan Smirnov. The Uprising of Bolotnikov. 1606–1607. 2nd Edition – Moscow, 1951
- Ivan Smirnov. A Brief Outline of the History of the Bolotnikov Uprising – Moscow: State Publishing House of Political Literature, 1953
- Ivan Smirnov. On Some Questions of the History of the Struggle of Classes in the Russian State at the Beginning of the 17th Century // Questions of History. 1958. No. 12
- Ivan Smirnov, Arkady Mankov, Elena Podiapolskaya, Vladimir Mavrodin. Peasant Wars in Russia of the 17th–18th Centuries – Moscow, Leningrad, 1966
- Ivan Shepelev. The Liberation and Class Struggle in the Russian State. 1608–1610. Pyatigorsk, 1957
- Leo Pushkarev. Peasant War Led by Ivan Bolotnikov
