= Siege of Moscow (1606) =

- Part of Uprising of Bolotnikov
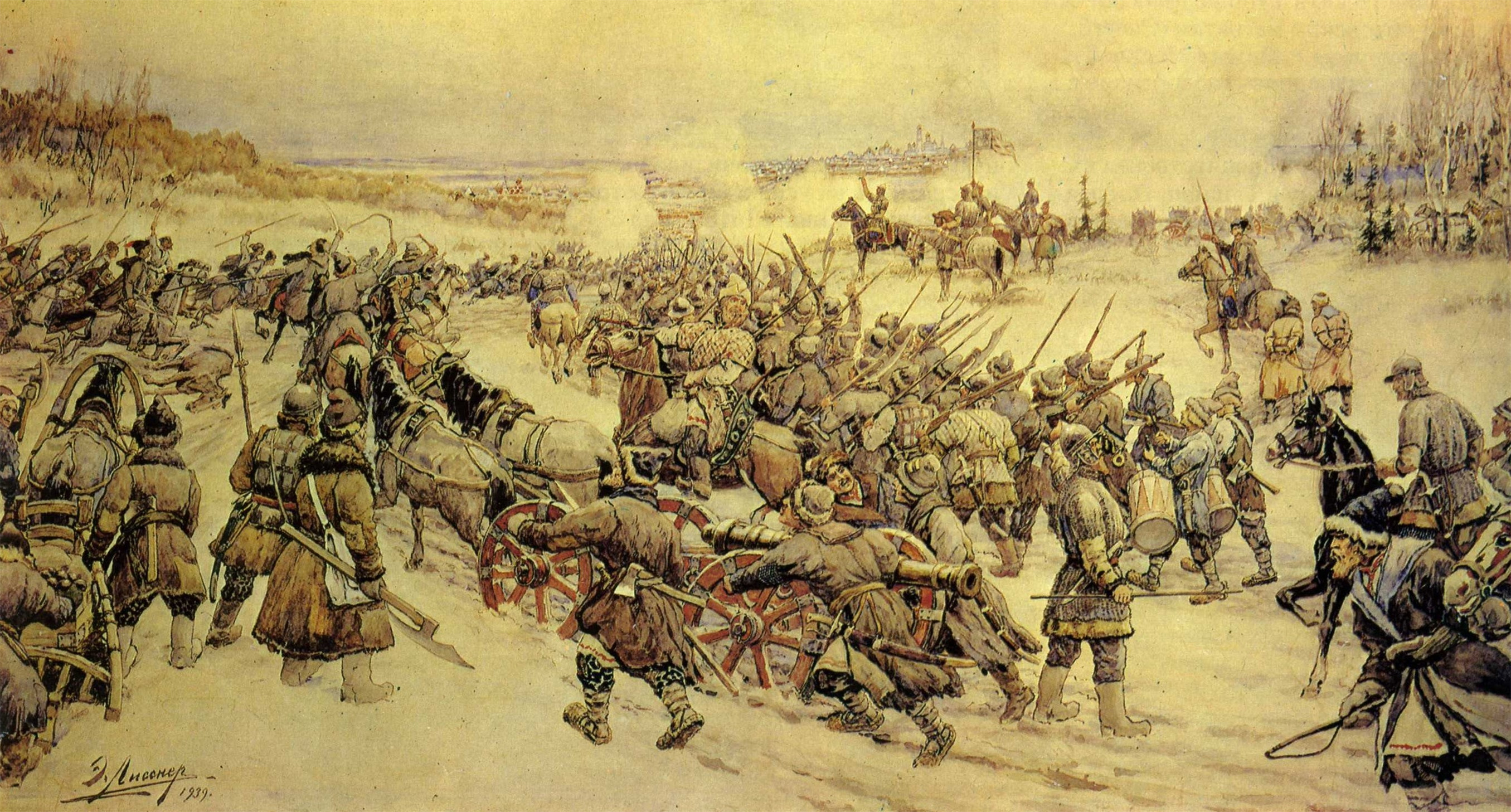
- The beginning of the battle of Bolotnikov's army with the tsar's troops at the Nizhniye Kotly near Moscow. Ernest Lissner
Date	October 7 – December 2, 1606
Location	Moscow, Kotly
Result	Victory of the royal troops

Belligerents
Ivan Bolotnikov	Vasily Shuisky

Commanders and leaders
Ivan Bolotnikov; Grigory Sumbulov; Prokopiy Lyapunov; Istoma Pashkov; Ileiko Muromets	Mikhail Skopin-Shuisky; Vasily Golitsyn; Boris Tatev

Strength
Up to 100,000 people	Unknown

Casualties and losses
Unknown	Unknown

The siege of Moscow (1606) was a siege of Moscow by the detachments of Ivan Bolotnikov in the fall of 1606, during the Time of Troubles.

== History ==
According to Dunning, "The siege of Moscow began on October 28, 1606." Pashkov's army established fortified camps at Kolomenskoe, with earthworks and palisades, and at Zabore, using encircling sleds stacked upon each other and then covered in water which froze, creating an "Improvised rampart as strong as stone." In early November, Bolotnikov arrived, and Pashkov moved to Kotly. Tsar Vasilii's siege voevodas occupied a gulyay-gorod before the Sepukhov gate and the Simonov Monastery, while the sortie voevoda Prince Mikhail Skopin-Shuiskii was stationed along the Iauza River. In particular, Skopin-Shuiskii prevented the rebels from occupying Krasnoe Selo, northeast of Moscow, the last road by which men and supplies were still reaching Moscow.

After the capture of Kolomna, Bolotnikov moved to Moscow. In the village of Troitskoye, Kolomenskoye Uyezd, he managed to defeat troops loyal to Tsar Vasily Shuisky, after which his army was stationed in the village of Kolomenskoye, seven versts from Moscow. There, his troops built fortifications and on October 7 began a siege of Moscow. Meanwhile, Bolotnikov began to send letters, including to Moscow, where he called on the people to revolt against the boyars, nobles and merchants, as well as kiss the cross "to the legitimate sovereign Dmitry Ivanovich".

When the rebels approached the capital, Shuisky took a number of measures to defend the city. Suburbs and settlements were fortified. The troops of Skopin-Shuisky, Golitsyn and Tatev were located at the Serpukhov Gate, from where they observed the enemy camp. Between Moscow and the surrounding cities, communication was established, troops patrolled the roads. In November, reinforcements came from Tver and Smolensk, which were largely composed of nobles, merchants, etc.

Bolotnikov's detachments were constantly replenished, tramps and serfs joined him. In total, they numbered about 100 thousand people and their army was divided into units under the command of the famous governors, among whom were Sumbulov, Lyapunov, Pashkov, Bezzubtsev and others. In November, the Cossacks of Ileika Muromets joined the uprising. Meanwhile, a split occurred in Bolotnikov's army. On the one hand there were nobles and boyar children, and on the other, serfs, Cossacks, etc. The first were headed by Istoma Pashkov and the Lyapunov brothers, all the rest were on the side of Bolotnikov. On November 15, after secret contacts with the Shuisky camp, the Lyapunovs and then Istoma Pashkov left the rebel camp. Prokopiy Lyapunov, at the same time, received the rank of duma nobleman from Shuisky.

In mid-November, Shuiskii opened the road to Smolensk when Grigorii I. Poltev led a force of men to clear Dorogobuzh and Viazma of rebels, before proceeding to the Mozhaisk fortress, where the ataman Ivan Goremykin surrendered after a week long siege. Simultaneously, Prince Danila I. Mezetskii led a force from Moscow to Mozhaisk, while Ivan F. Kriuk-Kolychev led a force towards Iosifo-Volokolamsk monastery, and then onwards to Mozhaisk. According to Dunning,"With the western blockade of the capital now broken, Kriuk-Kolychev combined the forces of Poltev, Mezetskii, and his own men with servicemen from Viazma, and returned to Moscow by 29 November.

According to Dunning, "Before December 2, Tsar Vasilii's officials secretly contacted Pashkov and made careful plans to use his betrayal during the upcoming battle to maximum advantage. On December 2, the third day of the frustrating siege of Zabore, a general battle developed south of Moscow."

On November 27, Shuisky's troops concentrated near the Danilov Monastery, under the general command of Skopin-Shuisky, attacked the enemy. During the battle, the rebel camp left the unit of Istoma Pashkov. On December 2, tsarist troops again attacked Bolotnikov and defeated his army near the village of Kotly. The remnants of his army, mainly Cossacks, strengthened in the village of Zaborye, however, after a short resistance, the ataman Bezzubtsev surrendered and swore allegiance to Shuisky. Bolotnikov himself fled to Serpukhov, and then to Kaluga.

According to Dunning, "Skopin-Shuiskii was then able to occupy Kolomenskoe, capturing Bolotnikov's camp and large quantities of supplies. The siege of Moscow ended in disaster for the rebels. They had suffered a crushing defeat, and Tsar Vasilli's army returned to the capital in triumph with many prisoners. Overall, the number of rebel prisoners executed after the siege of Moscow was estimated by contemporaries to be as high as 15,000."

== Sources ==
- The Great Russian Troubles. Moscow: DAR. 2007. p. 672. ISBN 978-5-485-00123-0.
