= Ivan Bolotnikov =

Russian rebel leader (1565–1608)

I. I. Bolotnikov is the guilty before Tsar Vasili Shuisky
- Depiction
- https://ru.wikipedia.org/wiki/Файл:Bolotnikov_s_povinnoy.jpg

Ivan Isayevich Bolotnikov (Note: In this name that follows East Slavic naming customs, the patronymic is Isayevich and the family name is Bolotnikov.) (Russian: Ива́н Иса́евич Боло́тников; 1565–1608) headed a popular uprising in Russia in 1606–1607 known as the Bolotnikov Rebellion (Восстание Ивана Болотникова). The uprising formed part of the Time of Troubles in Russia.

== Early life ==
Describing Bolotnikov, Paul Avrich states, "Contemporaries depict him as a tall and powerfully-built, and an intelligent and energetic leader." Bolotnikov was a slave of Prince Andrei Teliatevsky, before running away to join the Cossacks along the steppe frontier between Muscovy and the Crimean Khanate. Captured by the Crimean Tatars, he was sold into slavery as a helmsman for a Turkish galley. Liberated in a sea battle by German ships, he was taken to Venice. Journeying back to Muscovy, he passed through Poland, where he heard tales of the Tsar Dmitri. This led Bolotnikov to Sambor, where he met Mikhail Molchanov. Molochanov was part of the group who had murdered Feodor Godunov, and subsequently a confederate of Grigori Shakhovskoi, plotting a revolt against Moscow via a new pseudo-Dmitri. In June or July 1606, Molchanov sent Bolotnikov onwards to Putivl with a letter stating he was a servant of the Tsar Dmitri.

== Rebellion ==
Molchanov sent Ivan Bolotnikov to the town of Putyvl to meet a voyevoda named Grigory Shakhovskoy. The latter received him as the new tsar’s envoy and put him in charge of a Cossack unit. Ivan Bolotnikov used this opportunity to muster a small army of runaway kholops, peasants, outlaws, and vagabonds, disgruntled with social and economic situation in Russia. He promised them to exterminate the ruling class and establish a new social system. By the order of Grigory Shakhovskoy, Bolotnikov and his army advanced to Kromy (today's Oryol Oblast) in August 1606, defeating the Muscovite army under the command of Prince Yury Trubetskoy. From there, he moved towards Serpukhov and ravaged the city.

=== Siege ===
Shakhovskoi made Bolotnikov Bolshoi Woywoden of the Putivl garrison, and according to Avrich, augmented that force with "fugitive peasants, impoverished townsmen, Cossacks, slaves, brigands, and drifters of every description who had flocked to Putivl to join the rebellion." Many were veterans of the Khlopko Rebellion and False Dmitry I campaign. Bolotnikov led this left wing of rebels from Kromy to Kaluga, to Serpukhov, and onwards to Moscow. A right wing of rebels, composed of a group led by Prokopy Lyapunov, a Ryazan militia commander, and Istoma Pashkov, a squire from Tula, advanced on Moscow from Tula. During the Siege of Moscow (1606), tsar Vasili Shuisky defended the southern portion of Moscow behind wooden walls built, while Mikhail Skopin-Shuisky attacked the rebel bases located at Kolomenskoye and Zaborie, and the Patriarch Hermogenes of Moscow denounced the rebellion as the work of "Satan and his demons."

=== Turning point ===
On 15 November, Liapunov, after being offered higher rank, a seat on the boyar council, and much silver, went over to the tsar with his Ryazan militia. The tsar received additional reinforcements from Smolensk and the Northern Dvina. On 26 November, Istoma Pashkov went over to the tsar. On 2 December, Skopin-Shuisky attacked Kolomenskoe and Zaborie, forcing Bolotnikov to retreat southwards to Serpkhov, then onwards to Kaluga, where he underwent a siege for the next six months.

=== Help from Prince Andrei Telyatevsky ===
In the spring of 1607, another imposter by the name of False Peter (also known as Ileyka Muromets; he claimed to be the son of Feodor I of Russia) came to Tula with a whole mob of robbers to meet with Prince Grigory Shakhovskoy. Immediately after this, the latter dispatched Prince Andrei Telyatevsky and his men to help out Ivan Bolotnikov, forcing Prince Mstislavsky to lift the siege of Kaluga. Bolotnikov moved to Tula. Thus, all the rebels met together in one place, their joint forces numbering some 30,000 people. It was then that Vasili Shuisky decided to attack all of them at once and left Moscow on May 21, 1607. He besieged Tula, but the insurgents managed to hold out until October despite deprivations and hunger. Bolotnikov sent letters to False Dmitry II in Starodub asking for help, but to no avail.

=== Surrender and death ===
Finally, Bolotnikov decided to negotiate his surrender. The tsar promised to pardon the insurgents in return for Tula. On October 10, the rebels surrendered to the authorities. Shuisky, however, did not keep his promise. Instead, he transported all of the rebel leaders to Moscow on October 30, and then executed each of them in a different way. Ivan Bolotnikov was transported to Kargopol, blinded and then drowned.
