= Khlopko Rebellion =

The Khlopko Rebellion was an anti-feudal uprising in Russia of the peasant and servile masses, which was the result of the strengthening of serfdom and the great famine of 1601–1603 at the beginning of the Time of Troubles. Among the many robber detachments operating at that time, the largest, operating near Moscow itself, was the detachment of the chieftain, Khlopko Kosolap, by whose name the phenomenon was named.

== History ==
The main part of the rebels was the kholops who fled from the estates due to the great famine of 1601–1603, as their masters refused to feed them, but hoped to claim their rights at them after the end of the famine. From the documents of that time, however, it is known that those engaged in robbery received the active support of the peasant population, which made it difficult to combat such detachments. At the same time, government documents do not indicate the political nature of the uprising – the participants in the servile movement are called in them "robbers" (criminals), and not "thieves" (political criminals). The "robbers" did not try to establish control over certain cities and fortresses. The aim of the detachment of Khlopko and others like them was not to seize power, but to obtain livelihoods that became habitual in the conditions of hunger.

The uprising swept many counties of the west, center and south of the Russian state, but the situation was especially difficult in the western regions of the country, where, on the one hand, with low natural yields, were the most severe consequences of mass starvation, on the other, trade routes connecting Russia with Poland and Sweden passed. The so-called "Belsky Mandate" of the Robbery Order is known, which describes the powers sent from Moscow to combat the robberies of commissioners. To combat crime, it was supposed to rely on local forces and the help of rural elders, and the noble militia should not be involved in the capture of the rebels. The measures taken did not significantly change the situation.

In August 1603, a detachment of 100 servicemen under the command of okolnichy Ivan Basmanov was sent from Moscow in a westerly direction to destroy the detachment of Khlopko, the number of which reached 600 people. However, in mid-September, government troops were ambushed by rebels. During the battle, Ivan Basmanov was killed, but the servicemen were able to defeat the rebellious slaves and capture the wounded Khlopko Kosolap, who was soon executed.

With the destruction of the Khlopko detachment, mass robberies in the Russian state did not stop, part of the slaves fled to the south, where they then participated in the Bolotnikov Uprising and other events of the Time of Troubles. By decree of Tsar Boris Godunov, a thorough investigation was conducted into the circumstances of the uprising, since among the rebels there were servants of disgraced boyars.

== Sources ==
- Gil. From the History of Grassroots Resistance in Russia – Moscow: Common Place, 2015, Pages 53 – 62
- Nikon Chronicle
- Nikolay Karamzin. "History of the Russian State", Volume 11
- Sergey Soloviev. "History of Russia", Volume 13
- Nikolai Artsybashev. "The Story of Russia"
- Vadim Koretsky. From the History of the Peasant War and Russia at the Beginning of the 17th Century. "Questions of History", 1959, No. 3, Page 137
- Encyclopedic Dictionary of Brockhaus and Efron. Volume 5, Page 130
- Encyclopedic Lexicon. Volume 5, Page 43
