= Smuta (video game) =

- Developer: Cyberia Nova
- Publisher: Cyberia Nova
- Designer: Alexey Koptsev
- Engine: Unreal Engine 5
- Platform: Windows
- Release: April 4, 2024
- Genre: Action-adventure
- Mode: Single-player

Smuta (Russian: Смута) is an action role-playing game developed by a Russian studio Cyberia Nova. Set in the Tsardom of Russia during the Time of Troubles, the game features an interactive world, where players fight enemies and complete quests. The game's development was backed by the Institute of Internet Development (Russian: Институт Развития Интернета), a state-owned organization, giving the developers 490,000,000 Russian rubles. (Note: $5,800,000 as of June 5, 2023, the day the second grant was disclosed.) The game released on April 4, 2024 for Windows through VK Play.

Smuta was negatively received at launch by various Russian outlets and players, who criticised the game's combat, locations, dialogue, and bugs, as well as the developer's actions on social media.

== Gameplay ==
Smuta is a third-person action-role playing game. Set in the Tsardom of Russia during the Time of Troubles (1598-1613), particularly during the Polish–Russian War and the Ingrian War, the player fights enemies from that time period, including warriors and mercenaries from the Polish-Lithuanian Commonwealth and the Swedish Empire, as well as some wild animals, like wolves. Certain game sections encourage stealth. The game features four playable character types: ratnik, archer, shish, and mercenary, which have different weapons and abilities. Non-playable characters can be talked to and give quests, completing quests grants rewards and progresses the story. In-game locations are separated out, as the game is not open world.

According to the developers, Smuta was inspired by The Witcher 3: Wild Hunt, Assassin's Creed, and Ghost of Tsushima.

== Development ==
Game designer and manager Alexey Koptsev got the idea for Smuta in 2020. The game was inspired by a novel "Russians in 1612" (Russian: Русские в 1612 году). 18 months of the game's development were spent in pre-production, during which employees of Cyberia Nova (at the time called Cyberia Limited) went to various museums, studied historical documents, hired consultants to ensure historical accuracy, and established the game concept. The main purpose of the game became to make youth more interested in Russian history. The developers chose Unreal Engine 5 as the game engine due to its technical capabilities.

On May 23, 2022, it was revealed that the Institute of Internet Development, a state-owned organization, granted Cyberia Nova 260,000,000 ₽ (Note: $3,900,000 as of May 23, 2022, the day the first grant was disclosed.) for the game's development, which was later increased to 490,000,000 ₽ by June 2023. In June 2022, the development studio was rebranded from Cyberia Limited to Cyberia Nova.

Smuta's was scheduled to be released on February 26, 2024, but in January the game was pushed back to April 4. On February 16, Cyberia Nova released one hour of gameplay footage. The public opinions on the showcase were divided. A free game demo was made available on March 30.

=== Post-release ===
In May 2024, Cyberia Nova has announced upcoming DLC expansions to Smuta. On 19 July, Kommersant announced that 100,000,000 ₽ were allocated to Cyberia Nova by the IID for the development of the first expansion, noting that the possibility of further expansions will depend on the game's revenue.

=== Leaks ===
On May 15, 2023, user Sergey Fedorcov uploaded a gameplay video of an early build of Smuta on a Russian blog platform DTF. On May 22, even more gameplay was shown to Igromania. Fedotsev claims to have found the build on a used laptop he bought. He also claimed that the build had two hours of story campaign finished. According to Igromania, the build was very unoptimized and crashed frequently. On May 26, Fedorcov leaked the build. Another build of the game was leaked in 2024.

== Reception ==
=== Pre-release ===
After unveiling Smuta's concept art and disclosing the budget, the developers have received significant criticism. iBXT Games speculated that the game might become a commercial failure due to overambition.

On June 4, 2022, shortly after Smuta's announcement, the game's official website stopped working, leading people to believe that the developers "ran away with the money" given by the IID and that the game was a scam. It was later revealed that the site was down because of the rebranding.

==== International reactions ====
Certain news outlets from outside of Russia have stated their discontent with Smuta's story, likening it to propaganda. Polish outlet PlanetaGracza called the game "anti-Polish propaganda with a million dollar budget". Alexey Koptsev later stated that the game won't be "anti-Polish", "anti-Swedish" or "anti-German".

==== Censorship from developers ====
Since February 2024, the VK group for Smuta have employed new rules, prohibiting users to insult developers and ask them to show the gameplay. This move was reported to have only worsened the developers' reputation.

=== Post-release ===
Smuta received generally negative reviews from the Russian press. Igromania gave the game a 4/10, praising the game's atmosphere and soundtrack, while criticizing the bugs, describing the combat as "unbalanced", and calling the story structure "repetitive". StopGame.ru, who rates games on a scale of "amazing" (Russian: изумительно) to "trash" (Russian: мусор), gave the game a rating of "trash" and likened the state of the game to The Lord of the Rings: Gollum. Championat lauded the art direction, but criticized the game's combat and stealth sections, while also calling the game world "empty". 3DNews praised the attention to detail, but criticized the game's traversal mechanics and stated that the characters have "no emotional weight".

Several State Duma deputees have commented on the game. Anton Gorelkin said that Smuta is "the first step in the new developments in Russian video games" and praised the idea of teaching youth history through gaming, but noted that the game will be hard to sell in the western world. On the other hand, Vitaly Milonov criticized the game, calling it "half-assed" (Russian: халтура), believing that the state "should be held accountable" for spending almost 500 million rubles on the game. Institute of Internet Development's director Alexey Goreslavsky responded to Milonov, stating that the money was issued on a non-refundable basis and that "the mere fact" of the game's existence is "already an achievement".

== Legacy ==
On June 28, 2022, a tie-in television series for Smuta was announced. The release of the series was originally scheduled to be released simultaneously with the game. On October 18, 2024, a visual novel spin-off game was announced for mobile devices; it was released on November 4 of the same year.
