= Patriarch Hermogenes of Moscow =

Saint Hermogenes of Moscow
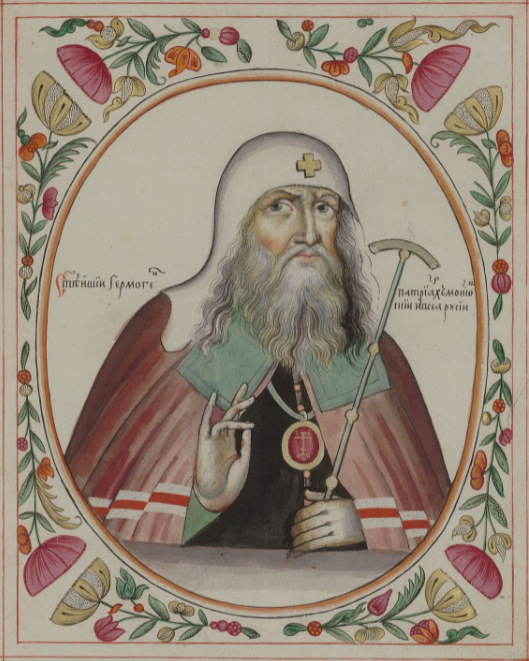
- Portrait in the Tsarsky titulyarnik, 1672
- Born: Yermolay c. 1530; Kazan, Russia
- Died: 17 February 1612; Chudov Monastery, Moscow
- Venerated in: Orthodox Church
- Canonized: May 12 1912, Moscow by Russian Orthodox Church
- Feast: May 12 (25)

Patriarch Hermogenes of Moscow
- Patriarch of Moscow and all the Rus'
- Church: Russian Orthodox Church
- See: Moscow
- Installed: 1606
- Term ended: 1612
- Predecessor: Ignatius
- Successor: Filaret

Personal details
- Buried: Dormition Cathedral, Moscow

Hermogenes, or Germogen (Russian: Гермоге́н) (secular name Yermolay) (before 1530 – 17 February 1612) was the Patriarch of Moscow and all Russia from 1606. It was he who inspired the popular uprising that put an end to the Time of Troubles. Hermogenes was glorified by the Russian Orthodox Church in 1913.

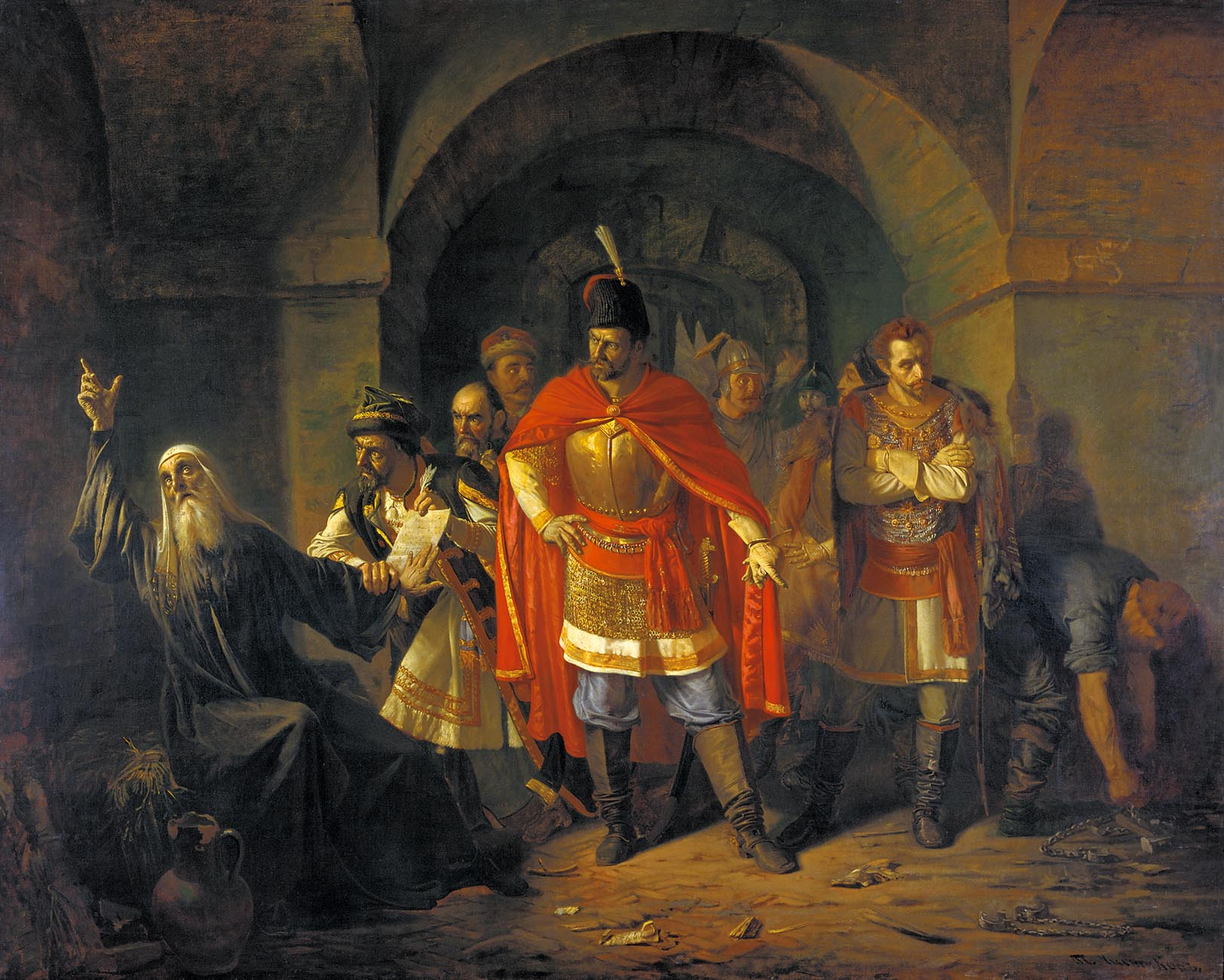
Patriarch Hermogenes refusing to bless the Poles painting by Pavel Chistyakov (1860).

At the Holy Synod of 1589, which established the patriarchy in Moscow, Hermogenes was appointed Metropolitan of the newly conquered city of Kazan. During the following two decades, he gained renown for a number of Muslim Volga Tatars converted to Eastern Orthodoxy.

In 1606, Hermogenes was summoned by False Dmitry I to take part in the Senate recently instituted in Moscow. There he learnt about the tsar's design to marry a Roman Catholic woman, Marina Mniszech, and firmly declared against such an alliance. At that he was exiled from the capital, only to return with great honours several months later, when the false tsar had been deposed, and Patriarch Ignatius followed suit.

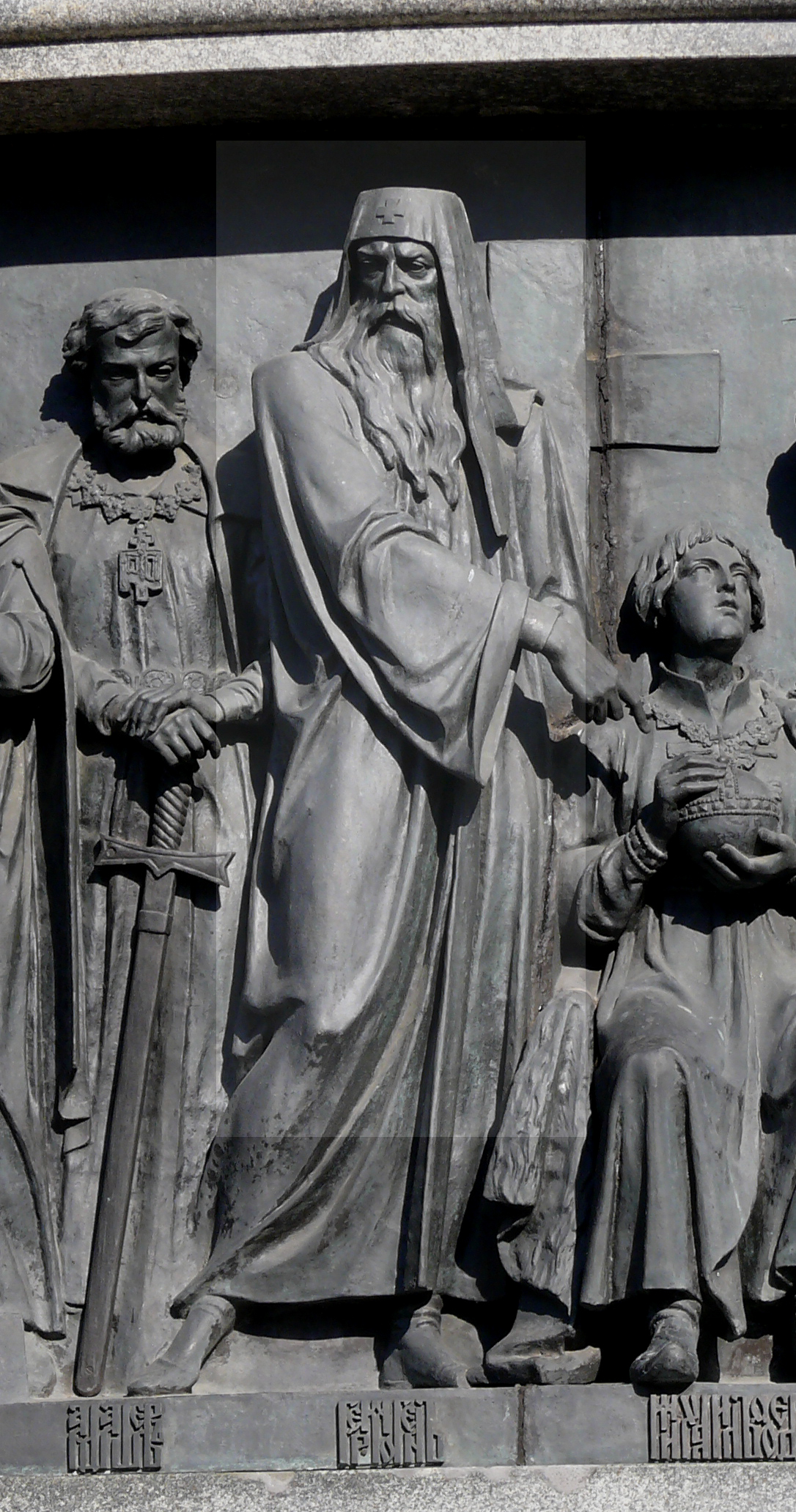
Hermogenes at the Millennium Monument in Novgorod

== Patriarch of Moscow ==
The new tsar, Vasily IV, helped Hermogenes to become Patriarch of Moscow and all the Rus': Metropolitan Hermogenes was elected to the primatial See, and on 3 July 1606 he was installed as Patriarch by the assembly of the holy hierarchs at Moscow's Dormition cathedral. Metropolitan Isidore handed the Patriarch the staff of the holy hierarch Peter, and the Tsar gave as a gift to the new Patriarch a panagia, embellished with precious stones, a white klobuk and staff. In the ancient manner, Patriarch Hermogenes made his entrance riding upon a donkey. During Vasily's reign, Hermogenes generally supported the tsar's efforts to pacify the country and anathematized Ivan Bolotnikov and his army.

=== Time of Troubles ===
When Vasily was dethroned and the Poles took hold of the Moscow Kremlin, Hermogenes staunchly opposed their plans to put Wladyslaw IV on the Russian throne, unless he converted to Orthodoxy. Despite knife threats from some of the boyars, he refused to sign any petitions to the Polish king, thus preventing Wladyslaw from coronation.

In December 1610 Hermogenes distributed letters to various Russian towns, urging the populace to rise against the Poles. When the volunteer army under Prokopy Lyapunov finally approached Moscow, he defied the Polish exhortations to anathemize the army. Despite being threatened with death, he cursed the Roman Catholics and showed support for Lyapunov. After that, he was arrested and thrown into the Chudov Monastery. There he heard about the new volunteer army, mustered by Kuzma Minin and commanded by Prince Pozharsky, and blessed them both. Thereupon the patriarch was beaten and starved to death.

== Death and legacy ==
The body of Hermogenes was buried in the Chudov monastery, but in 1654 was transferred to the Moscow Dormition cathedral. The purported relics of Patriarch Hermogenes were accidentally found in one of the crypts of the Chudov Monastery during the 1913 repair works. In connection with the Romanov Dynasty Tercentenary, celebrated that same year, he was canonized as a hieromartyr and transferred to the nearby Dormition Cathedral.

The Russian Orthodox Church commemorates him on 17 February, the day of his death, and 12 May, the day of his recognized glorification.

Eastern Orthodox Church titles
Preceded by Ignatius	Patriarch of Moscow and all Russia; 1606–1612	Succeeded by Filaret
