= Vasily Golitsyn (1572) =

Russian commander, nobleman and governor

Vasily Vasilievich Golitsyn
- Born: 1572
- Died: January 25, 1619 (aged 46–47); Vilna, Polish–Lithuanian Commonwealth
- Occupations: Nobleman, voivode and boyar
- Parents: Vasily Golitsyn (father); Marfa Sitskaya (mother)

Prince Vasily Vasilievich Golitsyn (1572 – January 25, 1619) was a Russian commander, nobleman and governor. Golitsyn was a prominent figure during the Time of Troubles between 1587 and 1613.

== Biography ==
Prince Vasily Yuryevich Golitsyn was the eldest of the three sons of the nobleman Vasily Golytsin who died in 1584. Golitsyn was married to Varvara Vasilyevna Sitskaya, the widow of the boyar Fedor Basmanov-Pleshcheev. His younger brothers were princes Ivan and Andrey Golitsyn.

By December 1590, Golitsyn has been appointed governor of the " Polk levoy ruki", the "Regiment of the Left Hand" which was the organizational and tactical unit of the Russian army in the 11th-17th centuries. (In the battle, the regiment of the left hand was part of the main forces and accordingly formed the left flank of the battle formation of the army.) He led this regiment in the Russo-Swedish War. By 1591 he served as the first governor in the fortress of Dedilov. From there he was recalled to Moscow in order to strengthen its defense during the invasion of the Crimean army under the leadership of Khan Gaza Girey. After the retreat of the khan from Moscow, Prince Vasily Golitsyn led the right-hand regiment to Tula.

In June 1592, he commanded a vanguard regiment in Novgorod. Then the voivode, Prince Daniil Nogtev, waged many disputes with him about "Mestnichestvo" - his right to the post on the basis of priority in the nobility. After the return of Russian regiments from Vyborg, Golitsyn stood with a large regiment in Novgorod in December. In March 1594 he was sent at the head of a large regiment to Tula. Then the second voivode, prince Pyotr Buinosov-Rostovsky, argued with him on the basis of Mestnichestvo but lost the argument, and the tsar "Ordered Prince Peter to be transferred to Prince Vasily Golitsyn, who will be the head". In 1598 – the second governor in Smolensk. At the same time, he argued about Mestnichestvo with the boyar and governor, Prince Timofei Trubetskoy, and, despite the persuasion and threats of Patriarch Lov, "Prince Vasily Golitsyn did not take the Governor's list from him and does not do business with him". In 1599–1602, the first governor in Smolensk; "And Prince Vasily was released to Moscow, and in his place in Smolensk ordered to be the boyar and governor, Prince Nikita Romanovich Trubetskoy".

In 1603, "in Moscow, in stone and wooden, on May 14, there were boyars and roundabouts... for lights and all kinds of care... In the new tsar's city in the stone beyond the Neglinnaya river from Moscow along the Nikitskaya street, there is a boyar Prince Vasily Vasilyevich Golitsyn". In the summer of that year, he accompanied Tsar Boris Godunov on a pilgrimage in the Trinity Lavra of Saint Sergius. In 1603–1604 he served as a judge of the Moscow Judicial Order.

In 1604, Boris Godunov appointed him to the vanguard regiment directed against Dmitry I. He was a participant in the Battle of Novgorod-Seversky. After the death of Tsar Boris Godunov, together with Peter Basmanov, he betrayed Fyodor Borisovich Godunov near Kromy. He went over to the side of the impostor, ordering himself to be bound in order to present himself as a captive.

In early June 1605, Golitsyn was sent by Dmitry to Moscow as governor and led the assassination of Fedor Godunov. In the future, he was invariably on the side of the victors in all conflicts and participated in the overthrow of both False Dmitry II (one of the organizers of the conspiracy in 1606) and Vasily Shuisky (1610).

In the spring of 1608, Golitsyn, together with Prince Dmitry Shuisky (brother of the king), led the Russian army as the second governor of the large regiment, which was twice defeated by Prince Roman Rozhinsky, the main governor of False Dmitry II. After the defeat near Bolkhov, Golitsyn, along with other governors, fled from the battlefield.

Golitsyn participated in the embassy to Sigismund III (1610) and was detained in Poland as a prisoner along with Metropolitan Filaret. Despite this, his name was called among the candidates for kings at the Zemsky Sobor of 1613.

Golitsyn died in Vilna, as a prisoner of the Polish 1619. He had no children.

== Sources ==
- Nikolai Golitsyn. Family of Golitsyn Princes – Saint Petersburg, 1892. Volume 1
- Evgraf Serchevsky (1853). Notes on the Family Golitsyn Princes. Saint Petersburg.
