= Time of Troubles =

1598–1613 chaotic period of Russian history

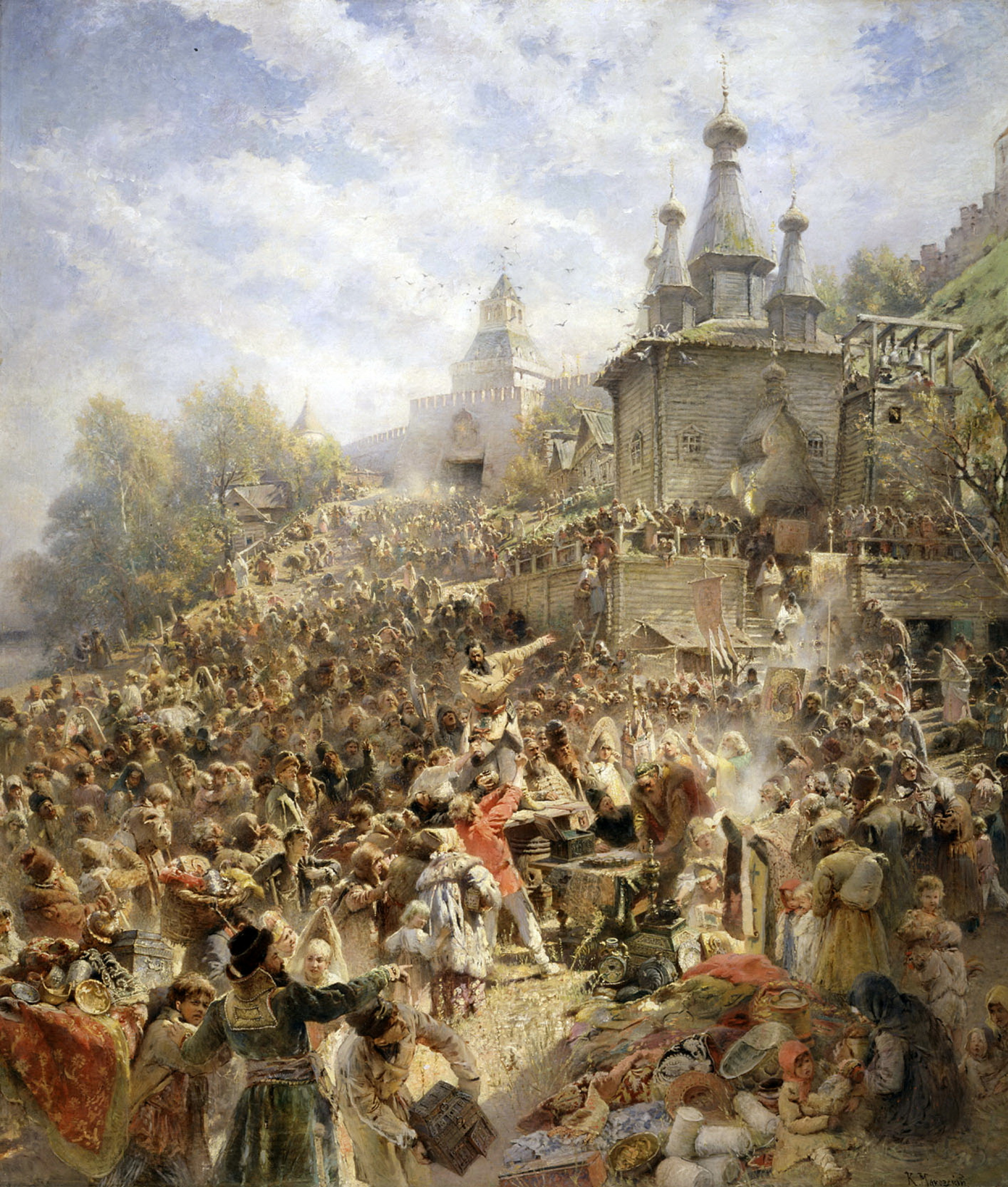
Konstantin Makovsky's Appeal of Minin (1896) depicts Kuzma Minin against the background of the church of St. John the Baptist appealing to the people of Nizhny Novgorod to raise a militia against the Polish invaders and Sigismund III Vasa.

The Time of Troubles (Russian: Смутное время, romanized: Smutnoye vremya), also known as Smuta (Russian: Смута, lit. 'troubles'), was a period of political crisis in Russia which began in 1598 with the death of Feodor I, the last of the House of Rurik, and ended in 1613 with the accession of Michael I of the House of Romanov at the 1613 Zemsky Sobor.

It was a period of deep social crisis and lawlessness following the death of Feodor I, a weak and possibly intellectually disabled ruler who died without an heir. His death ended the main line of the Rurik dynasty, leading to a violent succession crisis with numerous usurpers and false Dmitrys (impostors) claiming the title of tsar. Russia experienced the famine of 1601–1603, which killed almost a third of the population, within three years of Feodor's death. Russia was also occupied by the Polish–Lithuanian Commonwealth during the Polish–Russian War and lost Smolensk.

The Time of Troubles ended with the election of Michael Romanov as tsar by the Zemsky Sobor of 1613, establishing the Romanov dynasty, which ruled Russia until the February Revolution in 1917.

== Background ==
Tsar Feodor I was the second adult son of Ivan the Terrible, the first tsar of Russia. Feodor's elder brother, Tsarevich Ivan Ivanovich, was the heir apparent; Feodor was never considered a serious candidate for the Russian throne. However, Tsarevich Ivan was allegedly killed in anger by his father on 19 November 1581, making Feodor the new heir apparent.

According to the historian Chester Dunning, "Tsar Ivan knew perfectly well that Fedor could not rule on his own; before his own death in 1584, he set up a council of regents to govern in his son's name. Ivan named as regents two leading boyars; Fedor's uncle, Nikita Romanovich Zakharyin-Yuriev (head of the Romanov clan), and Prince Ivan F. Mstislavsky; he also named two leading members of his own court: a premier prince of the blood, the popular and heroic Prince Ivan Petrovich Shuisky, and Fedor's brother-in-law, Boris Godunov. On the day of the coronation, Boris was named koniushii boiarin (master of the horse or equerry) – a title that immediately identified him as the most powerful member of the boyar council. Prince Ivan Mstislavsky made a bid for power in 1585. He was stopped by the other regents and was forced to become a monk – which in Russia was an irreversible step. Out of this episode grew a tacit alliance between the Godunovs and the Romanovs to protect their families' interests." In 1586, after an anti-Godunov riot, "Aged Prince Ivan Shuisky was forced to become a monk and kept under heavy guard. Boris Godunov was now Tsar Fedor's sole regent and the most powerful man in Russia."

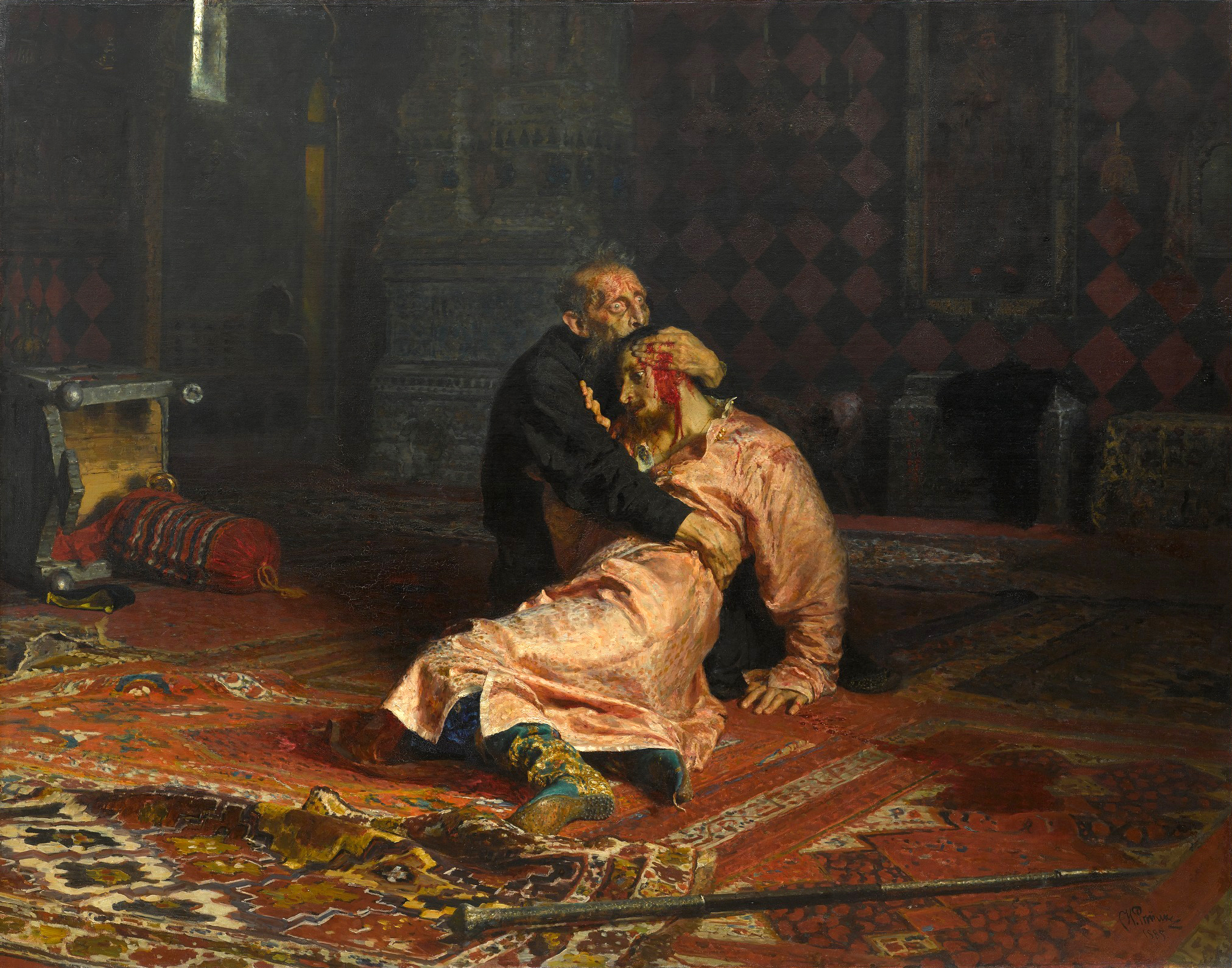
Ilya Repin's Ivan the Terrible and His Son Ivan (1885), depicting the accidental killing of Tsarevich Ivan Ivanovich by his father Ivan the Terrible; it made Feodor I heir to the Russian throne.

In the middle of the 16th century, Russia suffered famines, pestilence and internal discord which were accompanied by Ottoman-backed raids by the Crimean Khanate. In 1571, Devlet I Giray, and his army ransacked its lands in the events known as Fire of Moscow. In 1591, Ğazı II Giray and his brother Fetih I Giray launched another raid in Russia, but they were completely defeated. This was the last trip of the Crimeans to Moscow.

After Tsar Ivan's death on 28 March [O.S. 18 March] 1584, Feodor was crowned as the tsar on 10 June. The pious Feodor took little interest in politics, ruling through Boris Godunov (his closest advisor, a boyar, the son-in-law of Malyuta Skuratov and the brother of Feodor's wife, Irina Godunova). Feodor produced one child: a daughter, Feodosia, who died at the age of two.

According to Dunning, "At the outset of Tsar Fedor's reign, Boris Godunov and other regents moved against a threat emanating from the court faction supporting Ivan the Terrible's youngest son, Dmitrii – the child of Ivan's sixth and last wife, Maria Nagaia. In May 1591, Tsarevich Dmitrii was reported to be dead. On the basis of testimony from several eyewitnesses," an investigative commission, "concluded that Dmitrii had accidentally slit his own throat during an epileptic seizure that came on while he was playing with a knife."

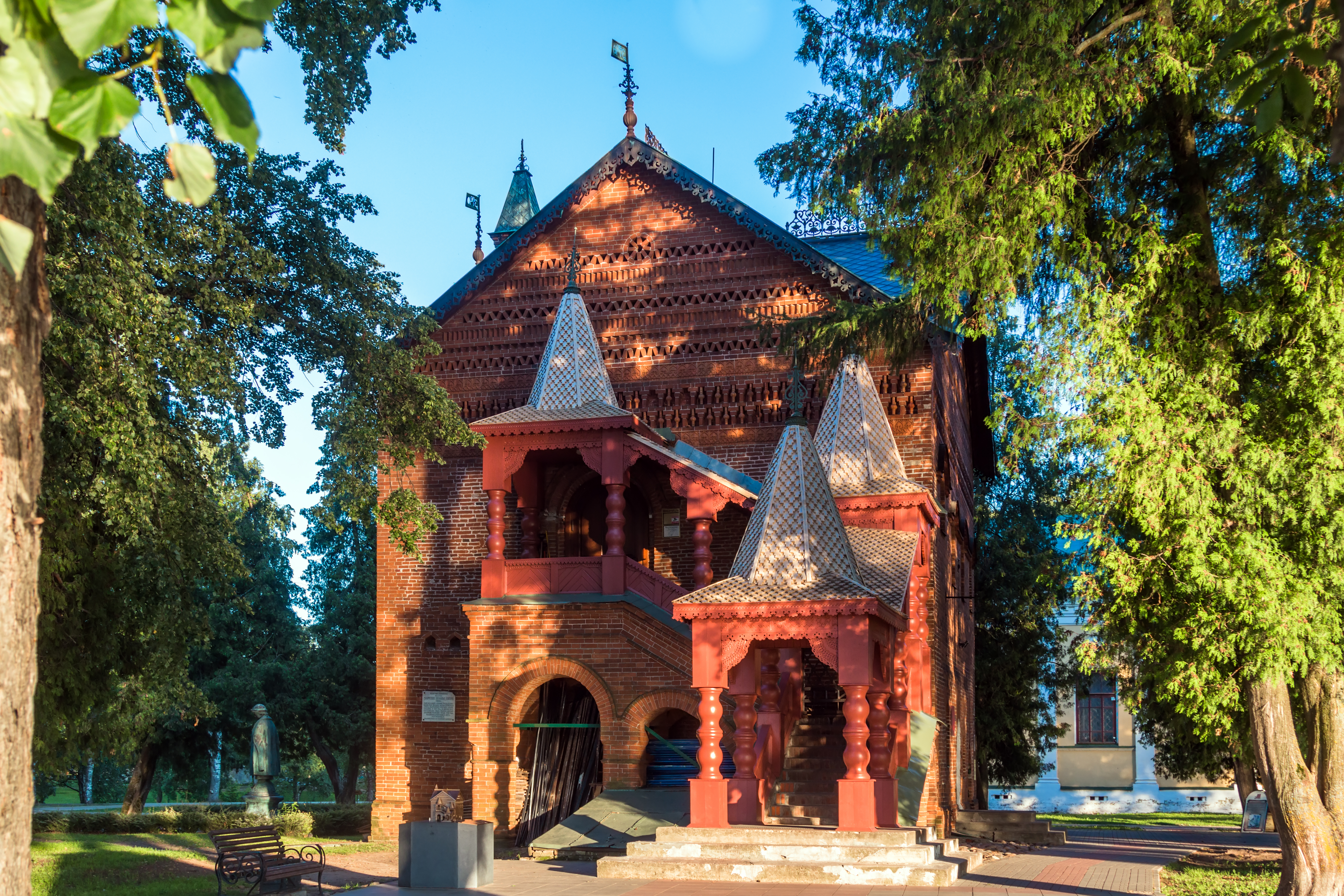
Palace in Uglich, where Tsarevich Dmitry lived and died

In January 1598, Fedor died. According to Dunning, "The tsar's death without an heir brought to an end the only ruling dynasty Moscow had ever known." Irina abdicated the throne to the boyar council and entered a convent. Godunov soon prevailed over his chief rival for the throne, Feodor Romanov, and was crowned in September 1598; according to Dunning, "To help calm any discontent and to cement his claim to the throne, the new tsar had himself 'elected' after the fact by a sham Zemsky Sobor." After the Romanov conspiracy of 1600, Feodor Romanov was forced to become a monk.

"Boris Godunov has been called one of Russia's greatest rulers," according to Dunning, "The man responsible for the expansion of Russia at the end of the sixteenth century was Boris Godunov." Yet in 1592, he had effectively enserfed millions, burdened the populace with heavy taxes, harassed the free cossacks, and in 1597, introduced a slave law converting contract slaves into slaves for life.

Between 1601 and 1603, Russia experienced a famine, potentially caused by the eruption of the Peruvian volcano Huaynaputina. This led to extremely poor harvests, with nighttime temperatures in the summer months often below freezing. Famine enveloped the country in 1602, followed by disease, claiming a third to two thirds of the population. Hunger riots, and the Khlopko rebellion of September 1603 also caused social instability. It was this famine and its consequences which served to hugely damage the image of Tsar Boris, which was worsened by the fact that the "many people came to view the famine as a clear sign of God's anger with the Russian people and their ruler."

== False Dmitry I ==
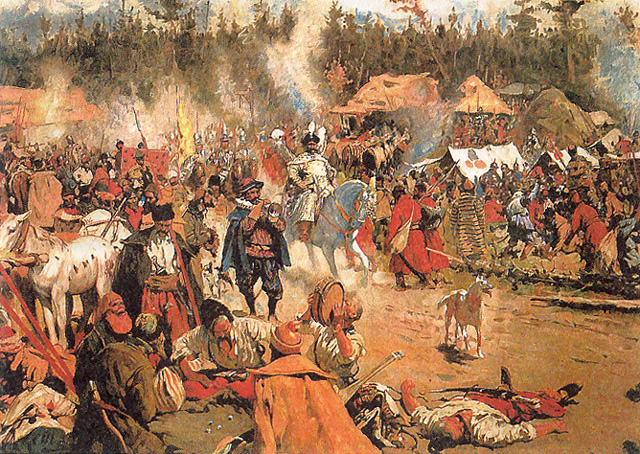
Sergey Ivanov's In the Time of Troubles (1886)

According to Dunning, "Russia's first civil war came about as a direct result of the bold invasion of the country by a man claiming to be Tsarevich Dmitrii, somehow 'miraculously' rescued from the 'usurper' Boris Godunov's alleged assassination attempt in 1591 and now returning to claim the throne from the illegitimate 'false tsar' Boris."

Conspiracies were rampant after Feodor's death. Rumors circulated that his younger brother, Dmitry, was still alive and in hiding (despite official accounts that he had been stabbed to death at an early age, by accident or by Godunov's order). Russia's political instability was exploited by several usurpers, known as False Dmitrys, who claimed to be the tsarevich (and heir to the tsardom). False Dmitry I appeared in the Polish–Lithuanian Commonwealth in 1603, claiming to be the heir to the Russian throne.

According to Dunning, "The source of the pretender scheme was a conspiracy among Russian lords. When Dmitrii finally revealed himself in Poland-Lithuania in 1603, Tsar Boris openly accused the boyars of organizing the pretender scheme. There is, in fact, quite a bit of evidence linking the pretender to the Romanov clan." Dimitrii had revealed his identity to the Ukrainian magnate Prince Adam Vishnevetsky, who helped him gain the support of the Zaporozhian and Don cossacks. Jerzy Mniszech housed Dmitrii, and helped secure several witnesses testifying him to be the Tsarevich Dmitrii.

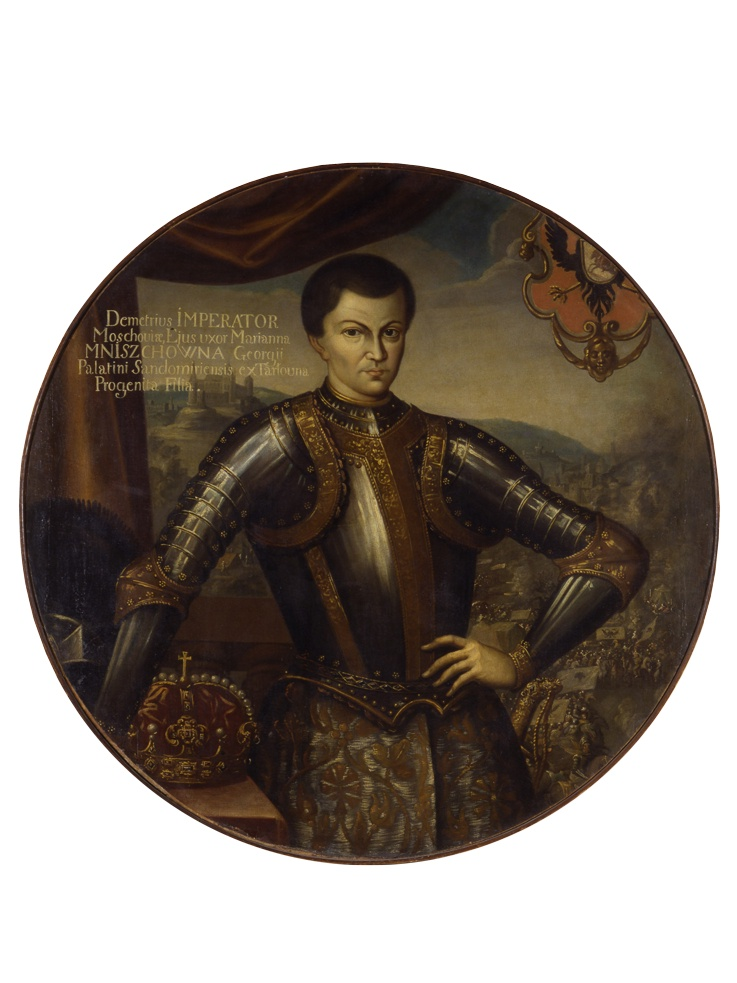
Official portrait of False Dmitry I (c. 1606)

Dunning notes, "King Sigismund, Polish Catholic leaders, and the Jesuits soon took great interest in reports that Dmitrii was considering conversion to Catholicism. They dreamed, among other things, of converting all of Russia and then using the Russians against Sweden."

By September 1604, Mniszech, as Dmitrii's commander-in-chief, had gathered about 2500 men. In October 1604 they crossed the Poland-Lithuania border into Russia. According to Dunning, "Dmitrii's invasion in October 1604 triggered the first phase of Russia's first civil war – a massive rebellion of southwestern and southern frontier provinces, towns, garrisons, and cossacks that grew into a much wider conflict that toppled the Godunov dynasty."

After Godunov's death in 1605, False Dmitry I made a triumphal entrance into Moscow and was crowned tsar on 21 July. He consolidated power by visiting the tomb of Ivan the Terrible and the convent of Ivan's widow, Maria Nagaya, who accepted Dimitry as her son and confirmed his story. False Dimitry I was married per procura to Marina Mniszech on 8 May 1606, in exchange for promises of land grants and wealth. He converted to Catholicism, relying on Polish Jesuits and Polish nobles (who were prominent at his court) and on Mniszech's private armies.

== Vasili IV Shuisky ==
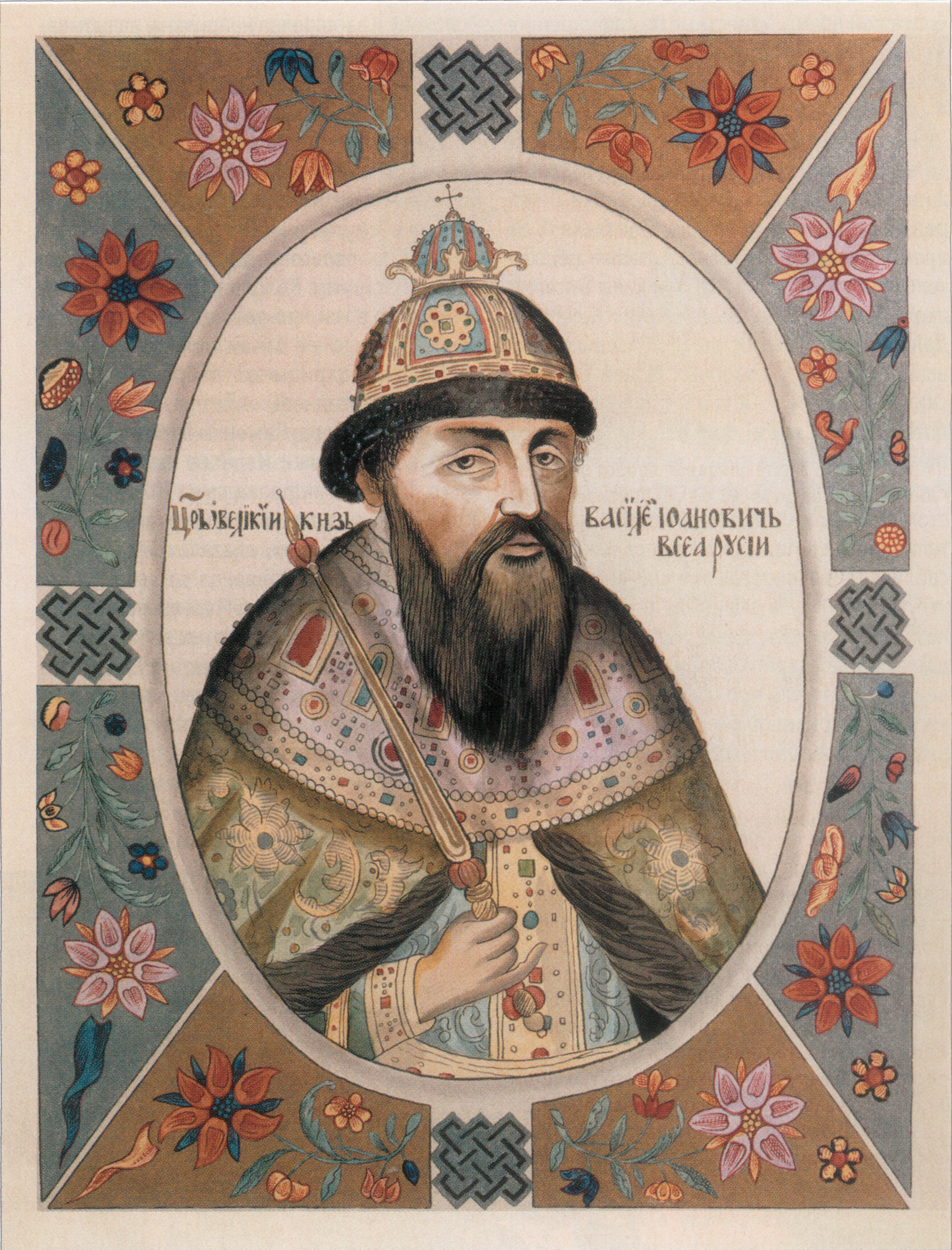
Portrait of Tsar Vasili IV Shuisky in the Tsarsky titulyarnik (1672)

According to Dunning, "Tsar Dmitrii's nemesis, Prince Vasilii Shuiskii, was one of the most senior and prestigious boyars whose family of Suzdal princes traced their ancestry back to Rurik…Tsar Dmitrii was a popular ruler while the conspirators represented only a relatively small group of disgruntled and ambitious individuals." Soon after Dmitrii's entry into Moscow, Vasilii, and his brothers Dmitrii and Ivan, spread the word that the tsar was Grishka Otrepyev, a runaway defrocked monk. Vasilii was condemned to exile, but then allowed to return to Moscow, and reinstated in the boyar council. Yet, "As soon as Vasilii Shuiskii returned to Moscow in late 1605, he began secretly conspiring to assassinate Tsar Dmitrii…By spring 1606, Shuskii could count on the support of some individuals at court, in the church, and among the merchant elite."

False Dmitry I quickly became unpopular, since many in Russia saw him as a tool of the Poles. On 17 May 1606, ten days after his marriage, Dmitry was killed by armed mobs during an uprising in Moscow after he was ousted from the Kremlin. Many of his Polish advisors were also killed or imprisoned during the rebellion.

Vasilii Shuiskii's conspirators included his brothers Dmitrii and Ivan, his nephew Mikhail Skopin-Shuisky, Vasily and Ivan Golitsyn, okolnichy Ivan Kriuk-Kolychev, okolnichy Mikhail Tatishchev, monks, priests, clerics, merchants, plus trusted dvoriane and deti boiarskie from Novgorod, Pskov, Smolensk, and Moscow. Several thousand Polish wedding guests were in Moscow for the tsar's wedding to the Polish princess Marina Mniszech. On the morning of 17 May 1606, Vasily Golitsyn and Mikhail Tatishchev led the assault on the Kremlin Frolov gate while Vasilli Shuiskii sent heralds warning Muscovites that the Poles were attempting to assassinate the tsar. A terrible massacre followed with six or seven hours of rioting in which 420 Poles were killed, and several hundred Russians. This allowed assassins to kill the tsar's guards. The tsar, fell and broke his leg while jumping out of a window, and was shot by Mylnikov. Shuiskii then attempted to justify the assassination by demonizing the tsar, claiming he was a sorcerer and skomorokh. His corpse lay on Red Square for three days, was denied a Christian burial, and was eventually burned. Legend states that his ashes were fired from a cannon in the direction from which he had arrived to Moscow. Yet a rumor was soon started that a foreigner resembling the tsar had been killed, which soon led to another civil war in the name of the "true tsar" Dmitrii.

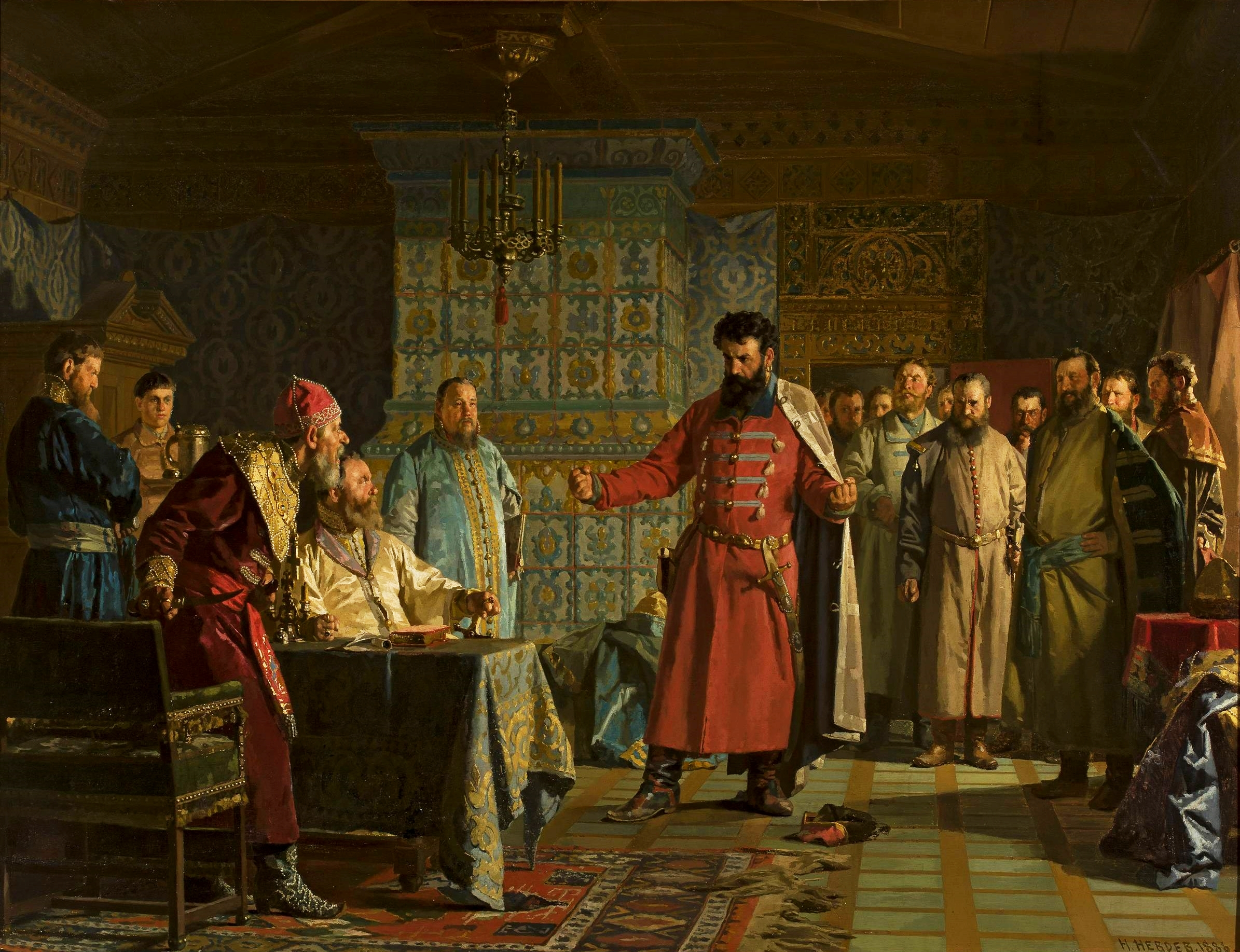
Zakhary Lyapunov's quarrel with Tsar Vasili Shuysky in the Kremlin, painting by Nikolai Nevrev (1886)

On 19 May 1606, Shuiskii's co-conspirators met at his townhouse, planning his assumption of power, and then proceeded to Red Square where he was proclaimed tsar. According to Dunning, "The narrowness of the group supporting him, his reputation as a liar, his act of regicide, his hasty seizure of power without the approval of a zemsky sobor, and his lack of any serious effort to gain the support of the common people all combined to undermine Tsar Vasilii's credibility and to destabilize his reign from the outset." Referred to as the "boyar-tsar", Shuiskii had himself crowned on 1 June, he then stripped Filaret Romanov of his office. Yet, Mikhail Molchanov escaped the assassination plot, fleeing to Putivl, where he conspired with Grigory Shakhovskoy to initiate the uprising of Bolotnikov.

According to Dunning, "Both before and during the siege of Moscow, Bolotnikov had written to Prince Shakhovskoi in Putvil urging him to find Tsar Dmitri and bring him to Moscow. Unable to comply, Shakhovskoi instead at some point made contact with the large group of cossacks on the southern frontier who were headed by the self-styled 'Tsarevich Petr,' the mythical son of Tsar Fedor Ivanovich who had supposedly been hidden from the evil Boris Godunov as a child and had grown up in obscurity. Shakhovskoi knew perfectly well that no such person existed, but he nevertheless invited Petr and his cossacks to hurry to Putivl to help restore Tsar Dmitrii to the throne." Shakhovskoi told Petr, that in the absence of Tsar Dmitri's arrival, "Petr could be tsar, since he was the true born son of Feodor Ivanovich and therefore the lawful heir to the realm." Tsarevich Petr was in reality Ilia Korovin, the illegitimate son of a Murom woman and the cobbler Ivan Korovin. In January 1607, Petr left Putivl for Tula with an army of 30,000. In May, Bolotnikov retreated to Tula following the siege of Kaluga. In June, Tsar Vasilii started the four-month siege of Tula.

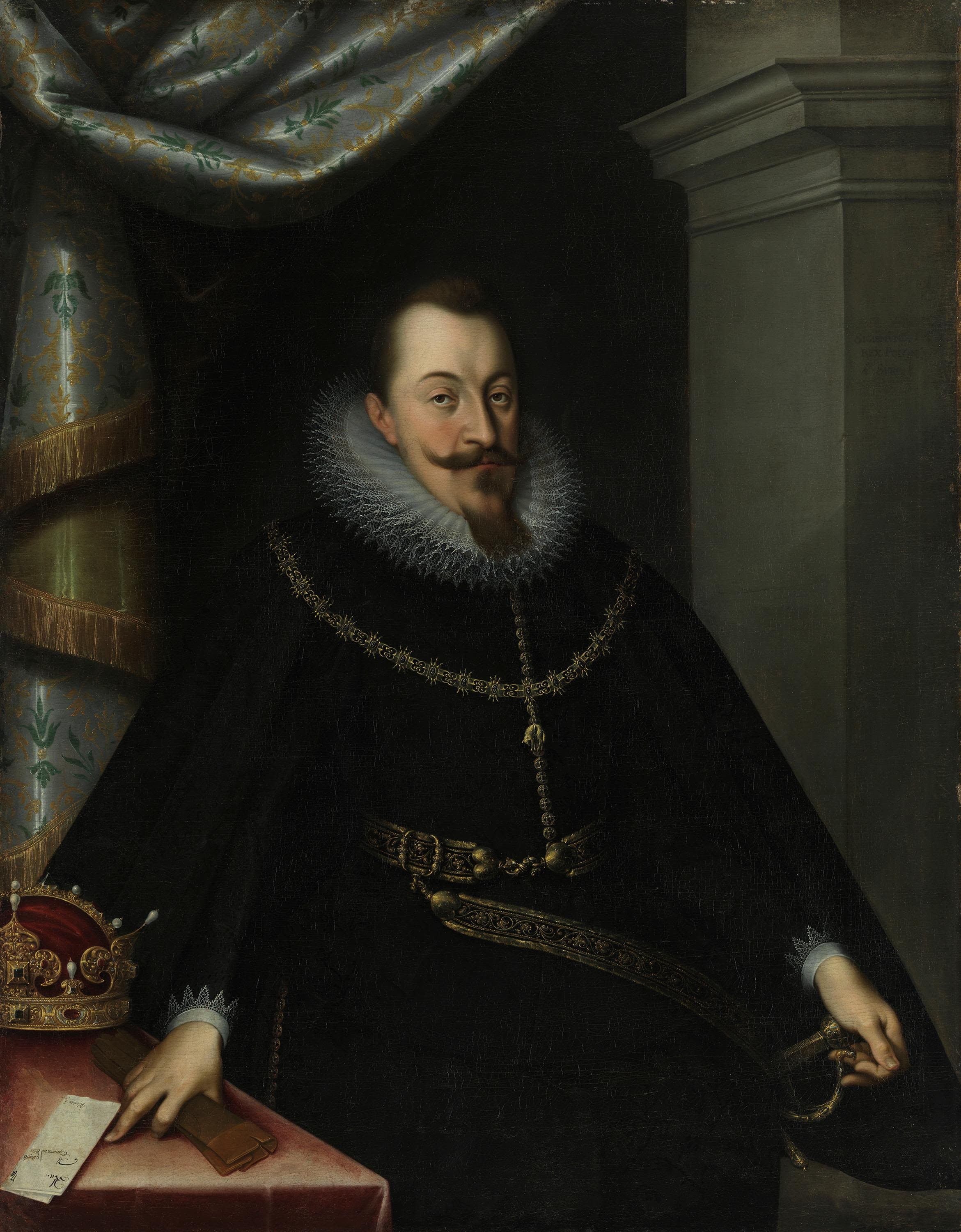
Portrait of Sigismund III of Poland by Joseph Heintz the Elder (1605)

In July 1607, a new impostor, False Dmitry II, came forward as the heir. According to Dunning, "At some point, the emissary from Tsarevich Petr and Bolotnikov, Ivan Zarutsky, stepped forward, also 'recognized' the tsar, and presented him with letters from the Tula leadership." On 11 October, False Dmitrii's army occupied Kozelsk. Tula had surrendered the day before, after the Tsar's army dammed the Upa, flooding Tula. Amongst those captured were Bolotnikov and Tsarevich Petr. Shakhovskoi and Yury Bezzubtsev also were captured, but escaped, joining the "second false Dmitrii". However, Tsarevich Petr was tortured and publicly hanged outside Moscow, while Bolotnikov was executed in Kargopol.

On 29 October 1607, the "second false Dmitrii" was joined by a group of Polish lords, with 1800 mercenaries, followed by another group of Polish lords and mercenaries in November. According to Dunning, "Also joining him at about this time was another copy-cat pretender, 'Tsarevich Fedor Fedorovich,' who claimed to be Tsarevich Petr's younger brother. Foreign mercenaries, cossacks, and some of Bolotnikov's men from Tula, including his lieutenant Ivan Zarutsky, continued to join the army. Then in April 1608, the Ukrainian Prince Roman Rozynski joined with 4000 foreign mercenaries. In the spring, Dmitrii's army attacked Dmitrii Vasilii's men at Bolkhov, defeating him after a four day battle. Advancing onward to Moscow, the second false Dmitrii set up court in Tushino, and laid siege to Moscow over the next eighteen months. According to Dunning, "Members of the Romanov clan, in particular, flocked to Tushino." In September 1608, Rozynski's men covered the areas west and south of Moscow, while Jan Piotr Sapieha's men covered the area north, defeating Prince Ivan Shuisky's men, and besieging the Trinity-St. Sergius monastery.

According to Dunning, "Russia was virtually inundated by a wave of opportunistic copy-cat tsarist pretenders during the later stages of the civil war." This included up to ten more pretenders, but the Tushino impostor brooked no rivals, hanging "Tsarevich Fedor Fedorovich" and "Tsarevich Ivan-Avgust", who claimed to be the son of Ivan the Terrible and his fourth wife Anna Koltsovskaia.

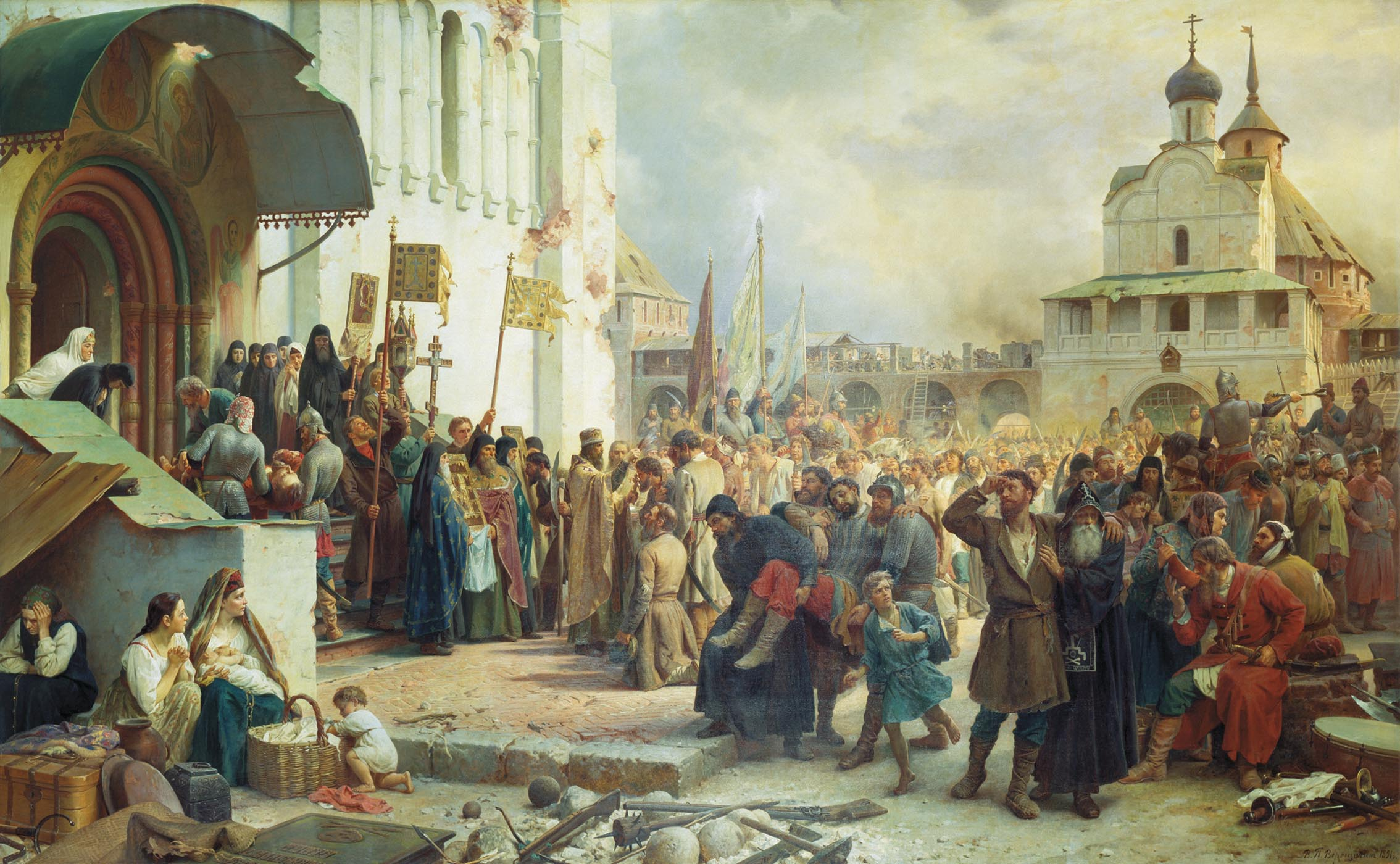
Defense of the Trinity-St. Sergius monastery, painting by Vasily Vereshchagin (1891)

In November 1608, a popular movement against the false Dmitrii started in Galich, and soon spread to Vologda and Kostroma, one in which Aleksander Józef Lisowski was unable to stop in the early part of 1609. In February, Tsar Vasilii was the target of an unsuccessful coup attempt by Mikhail Tatishchev, followed by another by Ivan Kriuk-Kolychev in the spring, both of whom were put to death. Then Prokofy Lyapunov declared himself the "white tsar", and led a revolt from the Riazan area. In the summer of 1609, the Crimean Tatars invaded Russia capturing slaves for their markets.

In February 1609, Prince Skopin-Shuisky signed a treaty with Charles IX of Sweden's representatives in Vyborg. In return for the use of 3000 mercenaries composed of Germans, English, Scots and French, Sweden would receive the Korela Fortress and surrounding towns and villages. On 10 May 1609, Prince Skopin-Shuisky led these mercenaries, along with 3000 Russian soldiers, from Novgorod for Aleksandrov, where he joined Fedor Sheremetev's army advancing from Nizhnii Novgorod after retreating from Astrakhan. In September 1609, King Sigismund III Vasa of Poland invaded Russia and began the siege of Smolensk. In late December 1609, the false Dmitrii fled for Kaluga. According to Dunning, "The 'tsar's' departure caused the entire Tushino camp to break up in disarray."

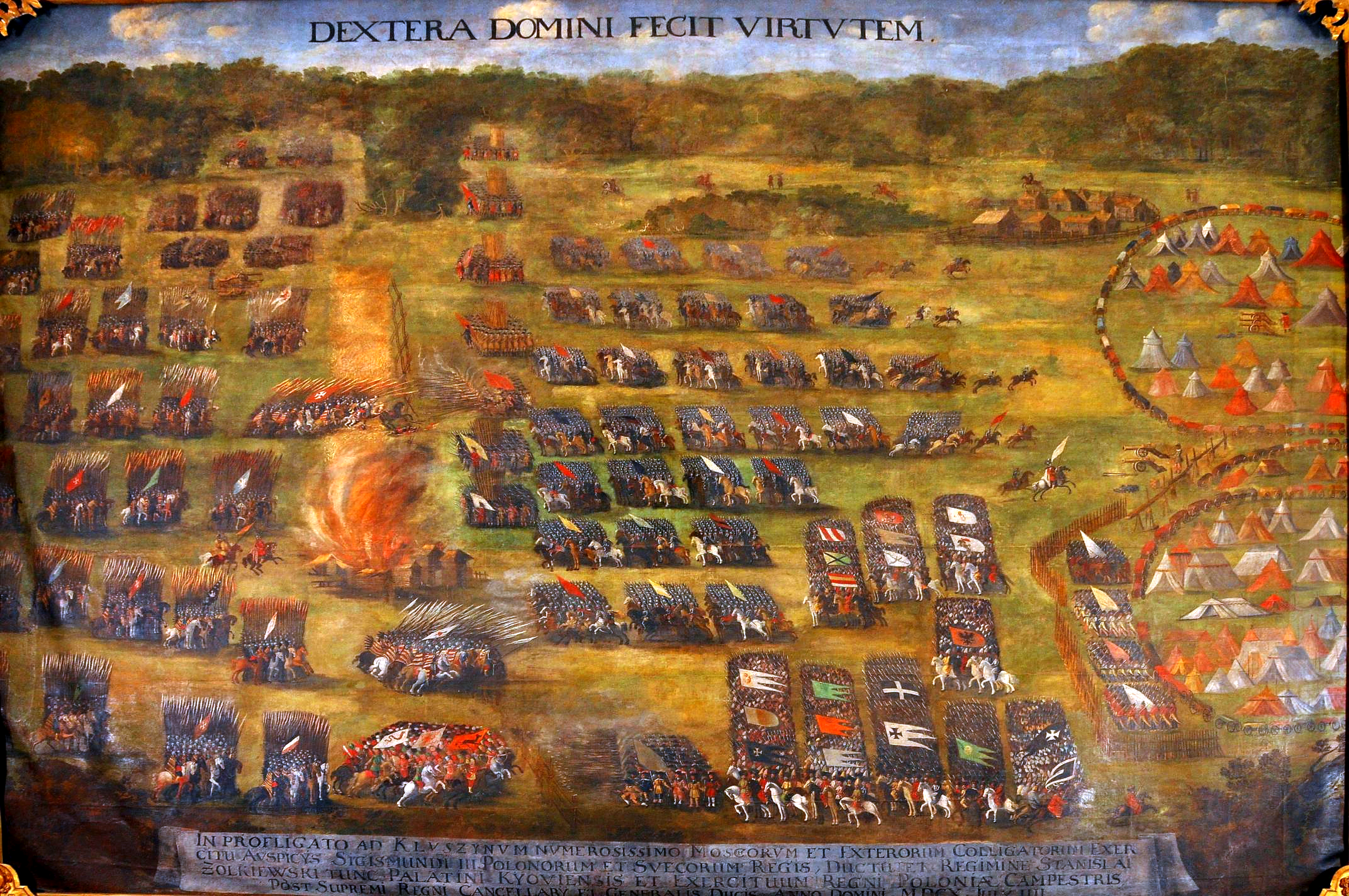
Battle of Klushino (1620), painting by Szymon Boguszowicz

On 4 February 1610, the Russian lords formally in the Tushino court signed a treaty with Sigismund III, hoping to end the civil war and restore order. According to Dunning, "Most Russian lords in the collapsing Tushino court came to believe that rebellion in the name of 'Tsar Dmitrii' was now a lost cause. Not surprisingly, they chose to negotiate with Sigismund III. Patriarch Filaret, other members of the Romanov clan, boyar Mikhail G. Saltykov, and Mikhail Molchanov were ready to support Sigismund's son, Wladyslaw, as tsar." Included in the Polish service were Rozynski, and Ivan Zarutsky's cossacks. However, Prince Shakhovskoi and Jan-Piotr Sapieha brought cossacks and foreign troops to the false Dmitrii's camp in Kaluga.

Tsar Vasilii made his brother Dmitry Shuisky his main commander following the death of Skopin-Shuisky. In June, aided by 10,000 mercenary troops supplied by King Karl, plus a spring levy, Dmitry Shuisky soon had an army of 30,000. Grigory Valuyev led an advance force of 6000 to Klushino, hoping to block Hetman Zolkiewski's advance. However, during the De la Gardie campaign, Dmitry Shuisky and Jacob De la Gardie failed to stop Zolkiewski's successful attack on Valuyev's camp. During the Battle of Klushino, both De la Gardie and Valuyev switched sides, while the Russian army's retreat became a rout, and the Poles advanced to Viazma. Simultaneously, the false Dmitrii's army advanced to Kolomenskoe.

== Polish and Swedish intervention ==
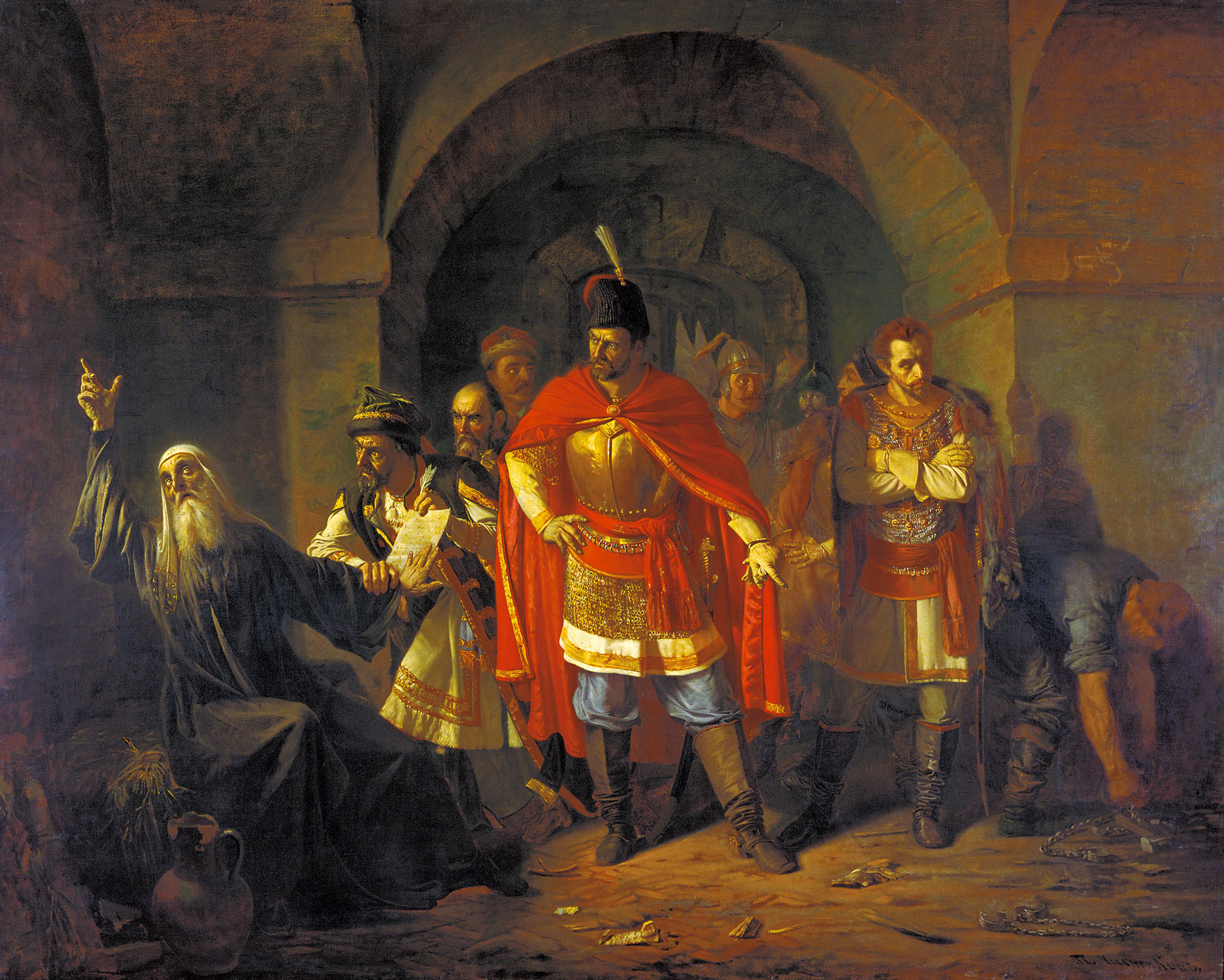
Patriarch Hermogenes refusing to bless the Poles by Pavel Chistyakov (1860)

Tsar Vasilii was now without an army, and Prokofy Lyapunov, Vasilii Golitsyn, and Filaret Romanov, along with others, plotted the overthrow of the unpopular tsar. On 17 July, they arrested Shuiskii, forced him to become a monk, and imprisoned him in a Kremlin monastery. A council of Seven Boyars ruled, until a zemsky sobor could be convened. Yet, with the arrival of Zolkiewski's army, and the false Dmitrii's army threatening Moscow, according to Dunning, "Up to five hundred courtiers, gentry, bureaucrats, and others traveled to Zolkiewski's camp to negotiate...The council of seven now quickly agreed to invite Wladyslaw to rule, and on August 17, about ten thousand Russians swore an oath of loyalty to Tsar Wladyslaw."

Yet, Sigismund's true intentions of conquering and personally ruling Russia became known after he arrested potential candidates to the throne, continued the siege of Smolensk, allowed Polish raids on Russian towns, and then established a Polish garrison composed of 800 mostly German mercenaries under the command of Alexander Gosiewski. On 11 December 1610, the false Dmitrii was killed in an act of revenge by Prince Petr Urusov, the captain of his bodyguard, while his widow Marina gave birth to his son "Tsarevich Ivan Dmitrievich". Muscovites then, according to Dunning, "...came to loathe Moscow's brutal foreign rulers and the Russian traitors who assisted them."

Anti-Catholic and anti-Polish sentiment was aroused in Russia, which infuriated the pro-Polish boyars. Sweden continued the Polish–Swedish wars on the Baltic coast, ending their military alliance with Russia, and began the Ingrian War. By this time, Russia was a failed state; the throne was vacant, the nobility quarreled among themselves, the Orthodox Patriarch Hermogenes was imprisoned, Catholic Poles occupied the Kremlin, Smolensk was still besieged, and Protestant Swedes occupied Novgorod. Tens of thousands died in battles and riots as bands of brigands swarmed, and Crimean Tatar raids depopulated and devastated Russia's southern borderlands.

According to Dunning, "Almost overnight Pozharskii, Liapunov, and even Zarutskii gained enormous prestige and popularity for fighting the hated foreigners. In January 1611, Nizhni Novgorod informed Prokofy Liapunov that the town, on the advice of Pariarch Hermogenes and the 'entire realm,' had resolved to raise forces to liberate Moscow." Though imprisoned, "...Hermogenes still managed to continue stirring up the patriot cause by writing incendiary letters to Russian towns right up to his death by starvation in February 1612." The cousins King Karl and King Sigismund were acting like competing conquerors, with Sweden occupying Korela in March, and the Poles occupying Smolensk in June. On 17 July 1611, Sweden's de la Gardie occupied Novgorod, and by early 1612, had annexed many border towns and fortresses, cutting Russia off from the Baltic Sea.

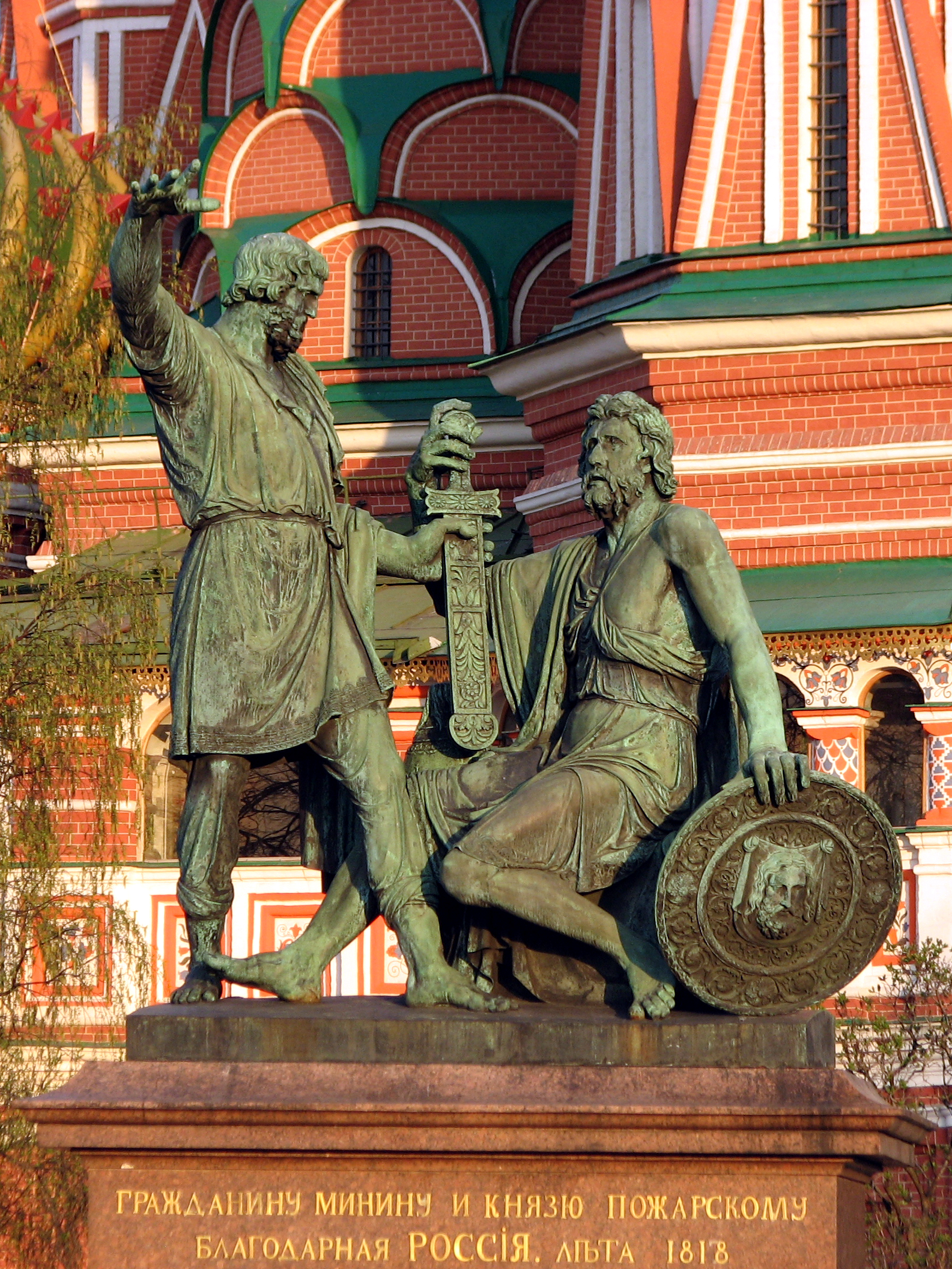
The Minin and Pozharsky monument in front of Saint Basil's Cathedral in Moscow

Popular discontent had increased by early 1611, and many sought to end the Polish occupation. Polish and German mercenaries suppressed riots in Moscow from 19 to 21 March 1611, massacring 7,000 people and setting the city on fire. The Polish commander Gosiewski had ordered the outer city burned, giving time for the Poles to stop the Muscovite uprising, and attacks of the "national militia", when Prince Pozharskii was seriously wounded. According to Dunning, "In that bloody work they were actively assisted by Mikhail G. Saltykov, members of the council of seven (especially Fedor Mstislavsky, Fedor Sheremetev, and Ivan Romanov), other nobles, and rich merchants who greatly feared their own countrymen and knew what fate awaited them if the insurgents were successful." The Polish occupation was now reduced to the Kremlin and Kitaigorod, which the Poles looted.

In the spring of 1611, the national militia was led by Prokofi Liapunov, and the Cossack leaders Dmitrii Trubetskoi and Ivan Zarutskii. On 22 July 1611 however, Liapunov was killed in a dispute with the Cossacks. Zarutskii became the militia leader, and he effectively stopped the summer offensive of Jan Karol Chodkiewicz.

False Dmitry III first appeared in Novgorod, then in Ivangorod on 23 March 1611. On 4 December 1611, this third false Dmitry arrived in Pskov. On 2 March 1612, a large number of Cossacks declared for the new false Dmitry. Yet Zarutskii viewed this new Dmitry as a threat, and organized his capture on 20 May 1612, and eventually had him hanged.

In the fall of 1611, Kuzma Minin, a butcher from Nizhny Novgorod, collected taxes from the populace, monasteries and crown peasant villages to fund a second militia (Russian: Второе народное ополчение). Minin recruited Prince Dmitry Pozharsky to lead them. Yaroslavl became the headquarters of the growing militia, and seat of the new provisional government. In June 1612, Pozharskii secured a truce with Sweden, allowing his army to advance upon Moscow, arriving there on 28 July 1612. Zarutski fled to Kolomna, with Marina, Ivan, and a few Cossacks.

== Battle of Moscow ==
In January 1612, part of the Polish army mutinied because of unpaid wages and retreated from Russia towards the Commonwealth. The Second Volunteer Army joined the other anti-Polish Russian forces in Moscow, besieging the Polish garrison remaining in the Kremlin. Well-armed and organised, the Second Volunteer Army took Yaroslavl in March 1612 and set up a Russian provisional government supported by a number of cities. Minin and Pozharsky entered Moscow in August 1612 when they learned that a 9,000-strong Polish army under hetman Jan Karol Chodkiewicz was on the way to lift the siege. On 1 September, the Battle of Moscow began; Chodkiewicz's forces reached the city, using cavalry attacks in the open and new tactics such as a mobile tabor fort. After early successes, Chodkiewicz's forces were driven from Moscow by Russian-aligned Don Cossack reinforcements. On 3 September, he launched another attack which reached the walls of the Kremlin; Moscow's narrow streets halted the movement of his troops, however, and he ordered a retreat after a Russian counter-attack. On 22 September 1612, the Poles and Lithuanians took and burned Vologda killing and capturing many of its inhabitants; many other cities were also devastated or weakened.

According to Dunning, "On October 26, Mstislavskii...led Ivan Romanov, Mikhail Romanov, and other sheepish aristocrats out of the Kremlin. The next day, October 27, the Polish garrison surrendered unconditionally, and national militia forces entered the capital."

== Michael Romanov and aftermath ==
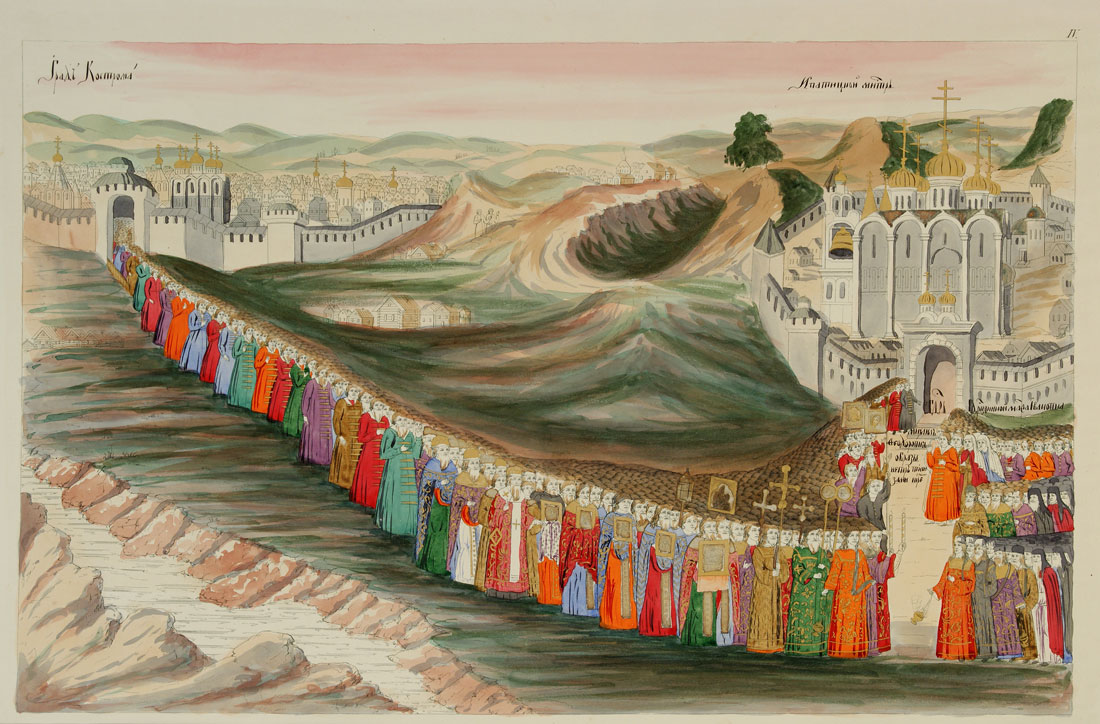
The delegation of the Zemsky Sobor marches to the Ipatievsky Monastery to inform Mikhail Fedorovich about its election (17th century)

The Zemsky Sobor elected Mikhail Romanov, the 16-year-old son of Patriarch Filaret of Moscow, tsar of Russia on 21 February 1613, and was crowned on 21 July. According to Dunning, "It is one of the great and tragic ironies of Russian history that the founder of the Romanov dynasty quickly put an end to the Troubles in part by crushing the very same patriotic cossacks who saved the country and brought him to power."

Romanov was connected by marriage with the Rurikids, and reportedly had been saved from his enemies by the heroic peasant Ivan Susanin. After he took power, Romanov ordered False Dmitry II's three-year-old son to be hanged and reportedly had Marina Mniszech strangled to death in prison.

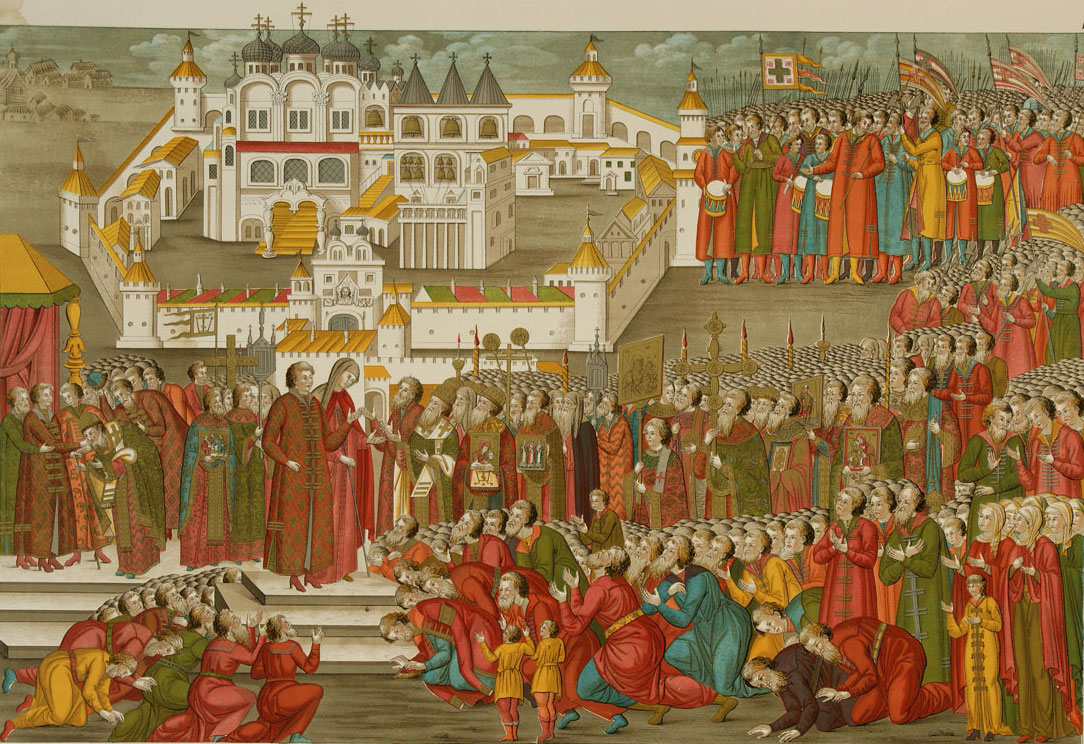
Crowd at the Ipatievsky Monastery in 1613 imploring Mikhail Romanov's mother to let him go to Moscow and become a tsar (17th century)

The Ingrian War lasted until the Treaty of Stolbovo in 1617, and the Russo-Polish War continued until the 1619 Truce of Deulino. Although Russia gained peace through treaties and preserved its independence, it was forced by Sweden and the Polish-Lithuanian Commonwealth to make substantial territorial concessions; most, however, were recovered during the next сentury. Ingria was ceded to the Swedes (who established Swedish Ingria), and Severia and the city of Smolensk were retained by the Poles. The Time of Troubles united the Russian social classes around the Romanov tsars, laying the foundation for the later reforms of Peter the Great.

Estimates of total deaths caused by the conflict range from 1 to 1.2 million, while some areas of Russia experienced population declines of over 50%. The cultivated area in Central Russia shrank by several times. Due to the shrinking population the peasants' wages improved and the process of enserfment which had intensified in the second half of the 16th century was rolled back to a degree.

== Cultural allusions ==
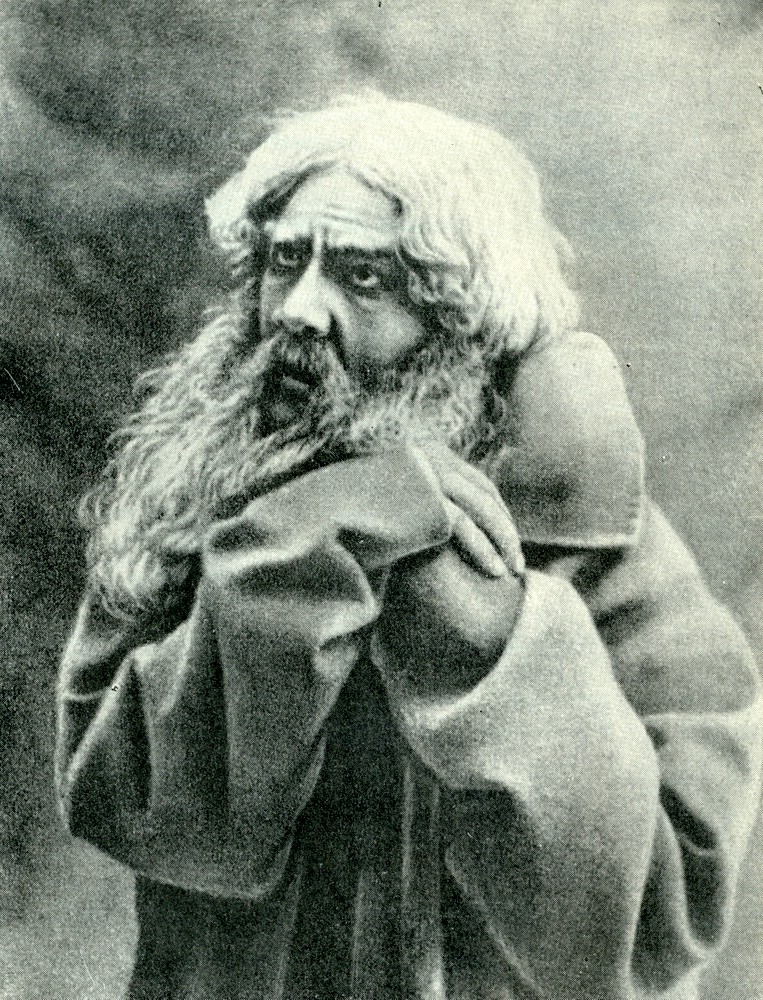
Feodor Chaliapin as Ivan Susanin in the opera A Life for the Tsar

Unity Day was held annually on 4 November to commemorate the capitulation of the Polish garrison in the Kremlin until the rise of the Soviet Union, when it was replaced by celebrations of the October Revolution. It was reinstated by President Vladimir Putin in 2005.

The Time of Troubles has inspired artists and playwrights in Russia and abroad. The three most popular subjects are the Pozharsky-Minin liberation of Moscow, the struggle between Boris Godunov and False Dmitry I, and Ivan Susanin, a peasant who supposedly sacrificed himself to lead the Poles away from Mikhail Romanov:

- A Life for the Tsar (Ivan Susanin during the Soviet era), an opera by Mikhail Glinka
- Boris Godunov, a play by Alexander Pushkin
  - Boris Godunov, an opera by Modest Mussorgsky based on Pushkin's play
- Two operas about False Dmitriy I: Dimitrij by Antonín Dvořák and Dimitri by Victorin de Joncières, with libretti based on Friedrich Schiller's unfinished play Demetrius
- The Monument to Minin and Pozharsky, in Red Square
- Minin and Pozharsky, a film by Vsevolod Pudovkin
- 1612, a 2007 epic film by Vladimir Khotinenko

Russian and Polish artists have painted a number of works based on the period. Chester Dunning, in his 2001 book Russia's First Civil War: The Time of Troubles and the Founding of the Romanov Dynasty, wrote that modern Russia began in 1613 with the founding of the Romanov dynasty.

On 4 April 2024, Smuta was released, a Russian action role-playing game set during the Time of Troubles.

== See also ==
- Ivan Bolotnikov
- Crimean–Nogai slave raids in Eastern Europe
