= Ernst Lissner =

Russian painter (1874–1941)

Ernst-Johann Nicholas Ernestovich Lissner (Russian: Эрнест-Николай-Иоганн Эрнестович Лисснер; 1874–1941) was a Russian painter and graphic artist, owner of a private art studio and the printing press "E. Lissner and J. Roman" in Moscow. He is best known by a series of historical paintings and lithographs devoted to the Polish–Russian War (1609–1618) and the Seven Years' War.

== Life and career ==
Lissner was born in the family of the merchant Ernest-Konstantin Antonovich Lissner (1837 – after 1897), who came from the Russified Austrian nobility. His father owned a well-known printing house on the Arbat, in which prestigious orders were executed.

Between 1900 and 1908 he studied at the Imperial Academy of Fine Arts in Saint Petersburg. His graduate work was a painting named Greetings to you, heroes of labor. From 1909 he participated in Art exhibitions, being an exhibitor and member of various associations of visual artists and art societies, such as the Society for Travelling Art Exhibitions, the Society of Artists Free Arts (1911–1918), and others.

After the October Revolution of 1917 and the Russian Civil War, Lissner continued to work as painter, and also actively took part in the turbulent social and artistic life of the first decade of the Soviet Union. In the 1920s he became a member of Moscow groups and associations of soviet artists, such as Art to working people (1925–1928), Wing (1926–1928), and the Repin Society of painters (1924–1929).

== Works ==
- The beginning of a battle between the Bolotnikov army and Tsarist troops in Lower Kotlov near Moscow
- Battle of the Nikitsky Gate in October 1917
- The expulsion of Polish invaders from the Kremlin, Moscow
- The uprising in Moscow in 1648

== Gallery ==
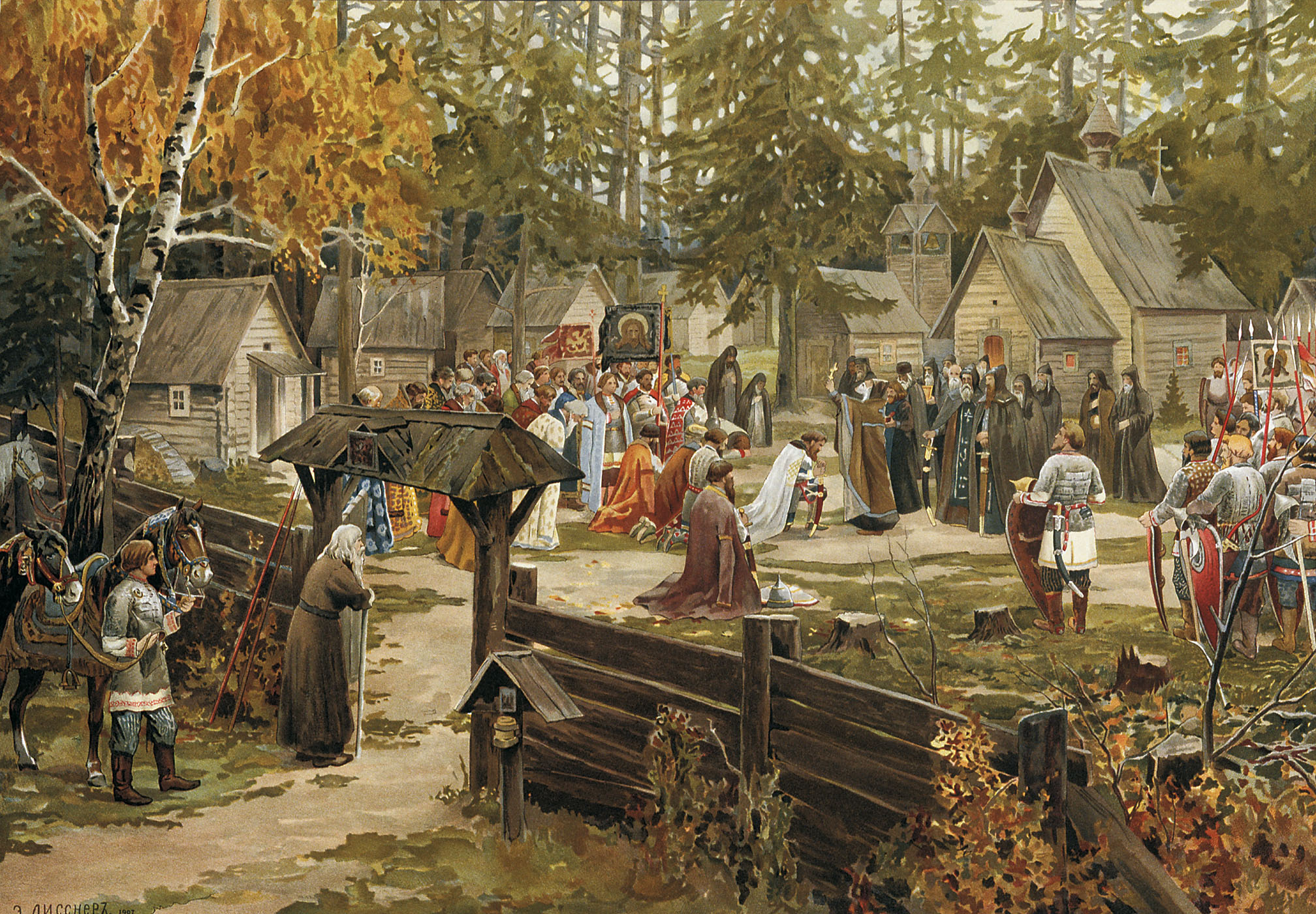
Trinity-Sergius Lavra - Sergius of Radonezh blessing Dmitri Donskoi before the Battle of Kulikovo.

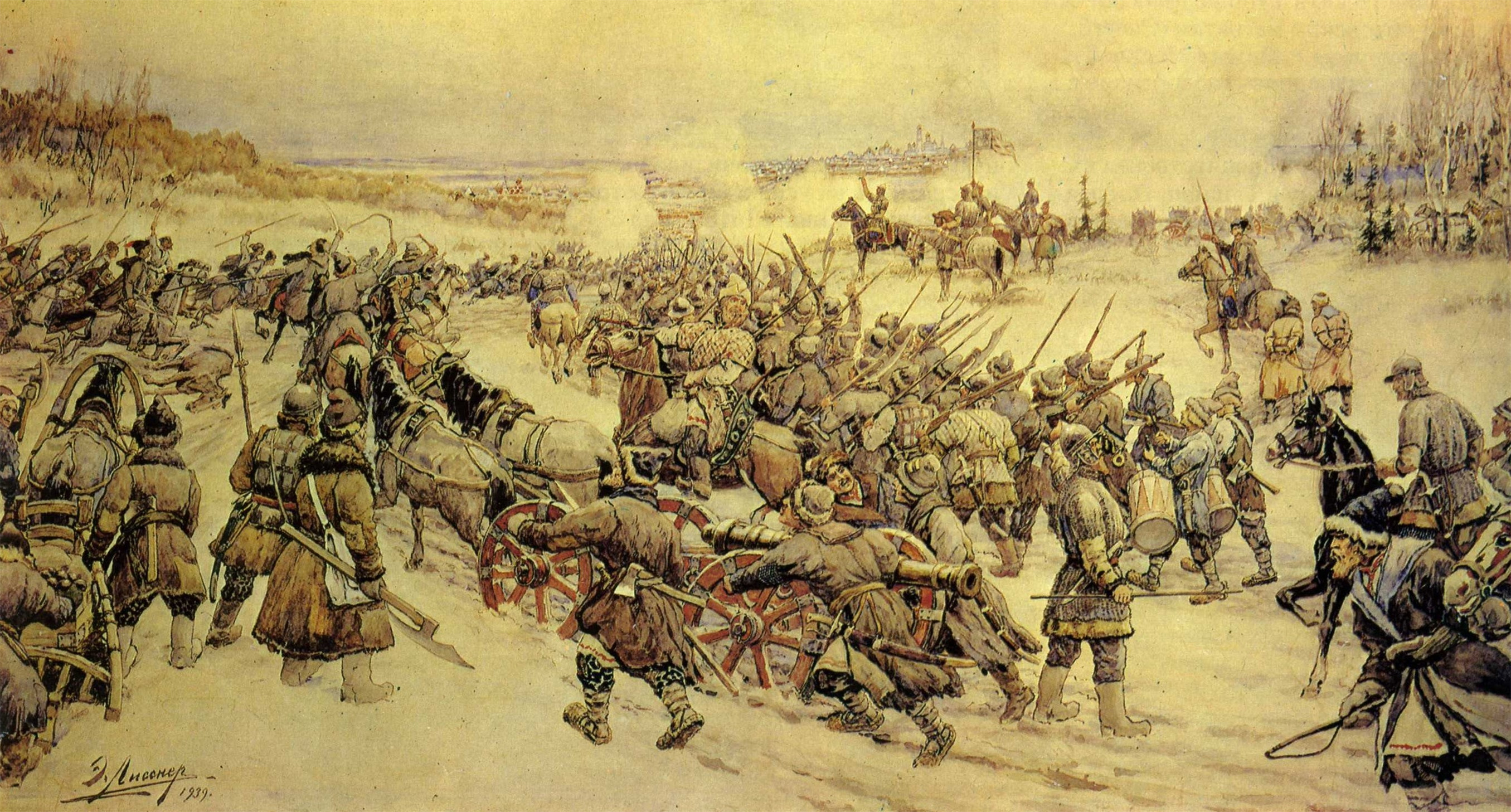
Bolotnikov's Battle with the Tsar's Army at Nizhniye Kotly Near Moscow

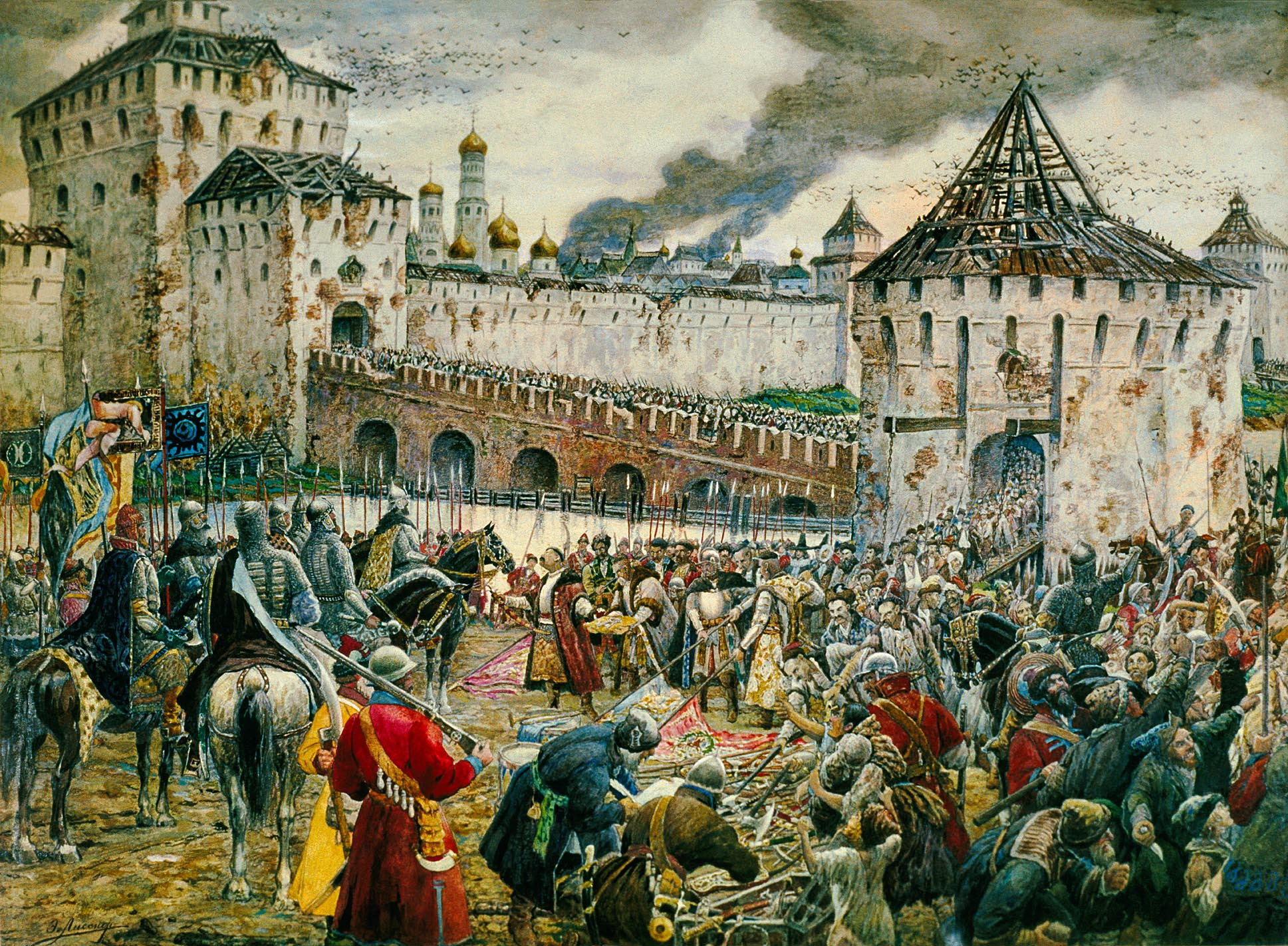
The Poles surrender the Moscow Kremlin to Prince Pozharsky in 1612.

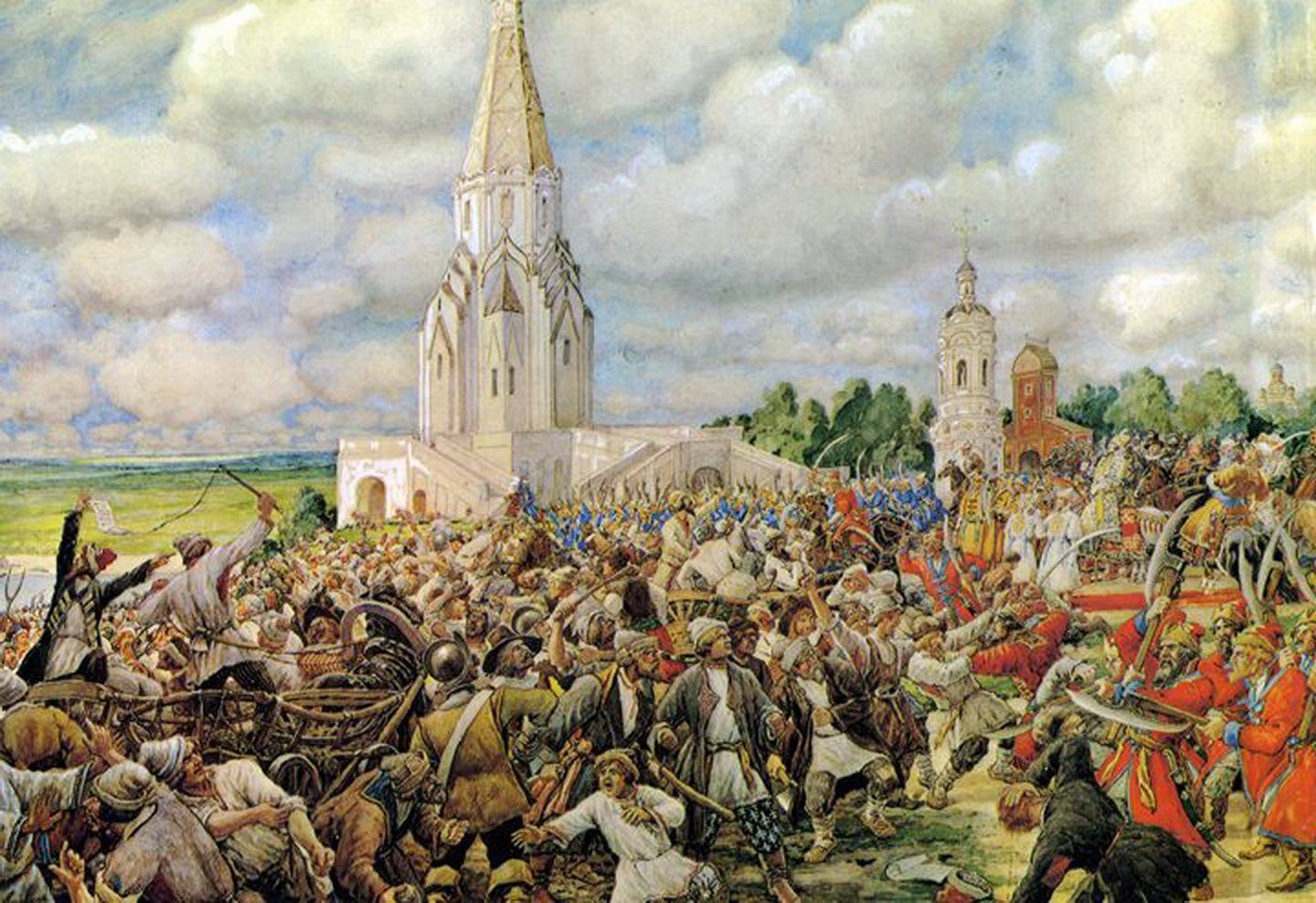
Copper Riot of 1662. Painted in 1938

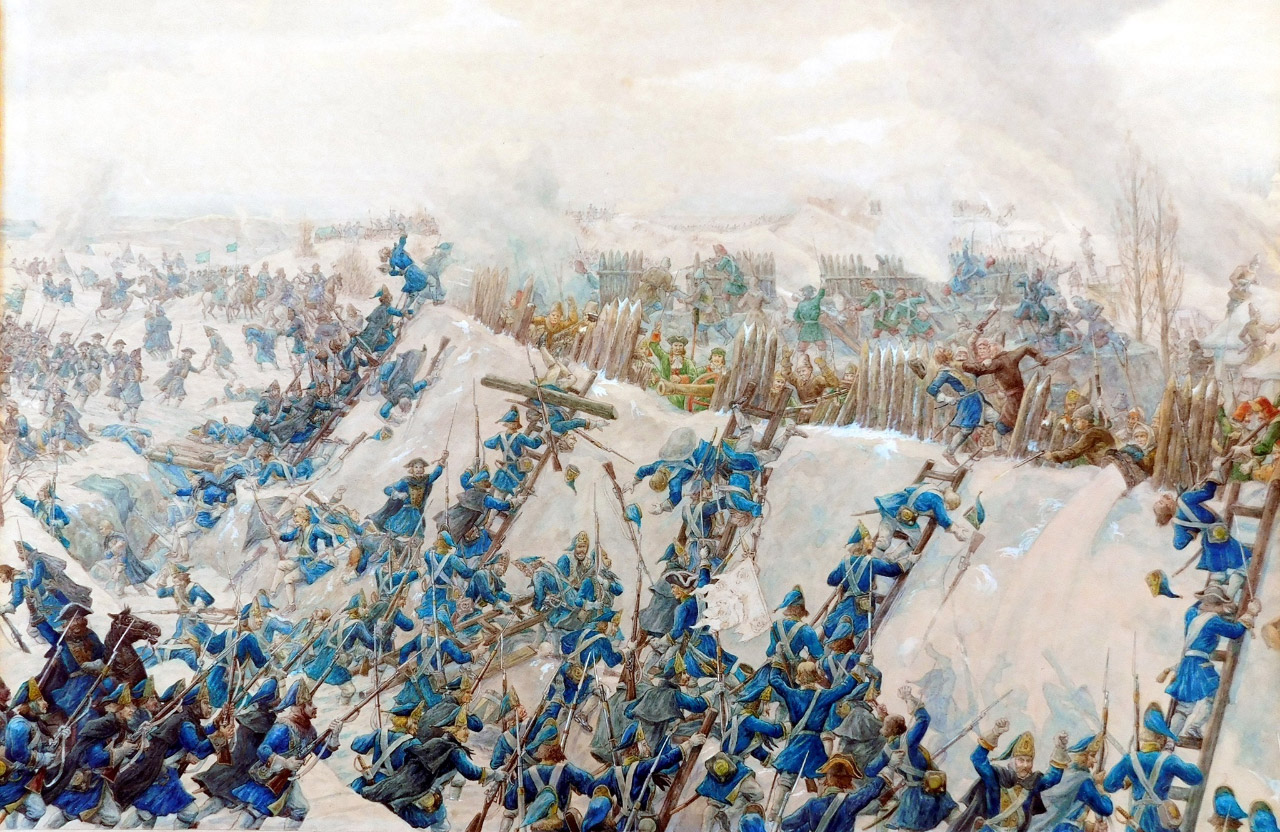
Siege of Veprik in 1709
