= Russian famine of 1601–1603 =

Russian famine of 1601–1603 Великий голод (Russian: Great Famine)
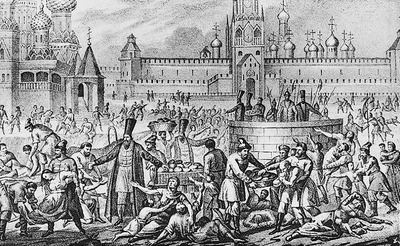
- Great Famine of 1601, a 19th-century engraving
- Location: Tsardom of Russia
- Period: 1601-1603
- Death rate: About 1/3 of the population
- Causes: Political instability during the Time of Troubles, possibly the 1600 eruption of the Huaynaputina volcano

The Russian famine of 1601–1603, Russia's worst famine in terms of proportional effect on the population, killed perhaps two million people: about 30% of the Russian people. The famine compounded the Time of Troubles (1598–1613), when the Tsardom of Russia was unsettled politically and was later invaded (1605–1618) by the Polish–Lithuanian Commonwealth. The many deaths contributed to social disruption. The famine resulted from a volcanic winter, a series of worldwide record cold winters and crop disruption, which geologists in 2008 linked to the 1600 volcanic eruption of Huaynaputina in Peru.

== Causes ==
A 2008 study by Kenneth L. Verosub and Jake Lippman documents worldwide famine after the eruption of the Huaynaputina volcano in Peru in 1600. Huaynaputina ejected 16 to 32 million metric tons of particulates into the atmosphere, notably sulfur dioxide, forming sulfuric acid and creating a volcanic winter; this reduced the amount of light which reached the surface, lowering the earth's Albedo, which scientists believe contributed to bitterly cold winters, loss of crops and animals, and massive famine around the world. As a result, people killed many animals with their bare hands to preserve their furs for warmth.

The famine was documented across the world: "Records from Switzerland, Latvia and Estonia record exceptionally cold winters in 1600–1602; in France, the 1601 wine harvest was late, and wine production collapsed in Germany and Colonial Peru. In China, peach trees bloomed late, and Lake Suwa in Japan had one of its earliest freezing dates in 500 years."

== Famine ==
Following the poor harvest of 1601 the prices of grain doubled, reaching 60-70 kopecks per quarter of rye. In the next year many peasants did not have enough seeds to sow the fields and by fall the prices grew to 3 rubles per quarter. The weather in 1603 was fine but many fields were empty and thus the famine intensified.

Boris Godunov's government attempted unsuccessfully to help the people by selling grain from state granaries at half price and later by giving away grain and money to the poor in the major cities until the treasury was depleted. During this two-and-a-half-year period, 127,000 bodies were buried in mass graves in Moscow alone. According to a witness "one third of the Muscovite Tsardom perished from the famine."

== Effects ==
The suffering and social disruption were part of the political unrest called the Time of Troubles. Petty gentry were hurt by the famine as badly as peasants and many were forced to sell themselves into slavery, joining the armed retinues of magnates. Others migrated to the steppe frontier and joined Cossacks, as did many runaway serfs. A large number of trained and armed individuals in the southern regions formed a large manpower pool which was tapped by multiple ensuing insurgencies.

== See also ==
- Droughts and famines in Russia and the Soviet Union
- Little Ice Age
- Volcanic winter
