= Dobrun =

Dobrun (Russian: Добрунь) is the name of several rural localities in Bryansk Oblast, Russia:

- Dobrun, Bryansky District, Bryansk Oblast, a village in Bryansky District
- Dobrun, Sevsky District, Bryansk Oblast, a settlement in Sevsky District
- Dobrun, Suzemsky District, Bryansk Oblast, a selo in Suzemsky District
