= Siege of Kromy =

1605 siege

- Part of Polish–Muscovite War (1605–18)
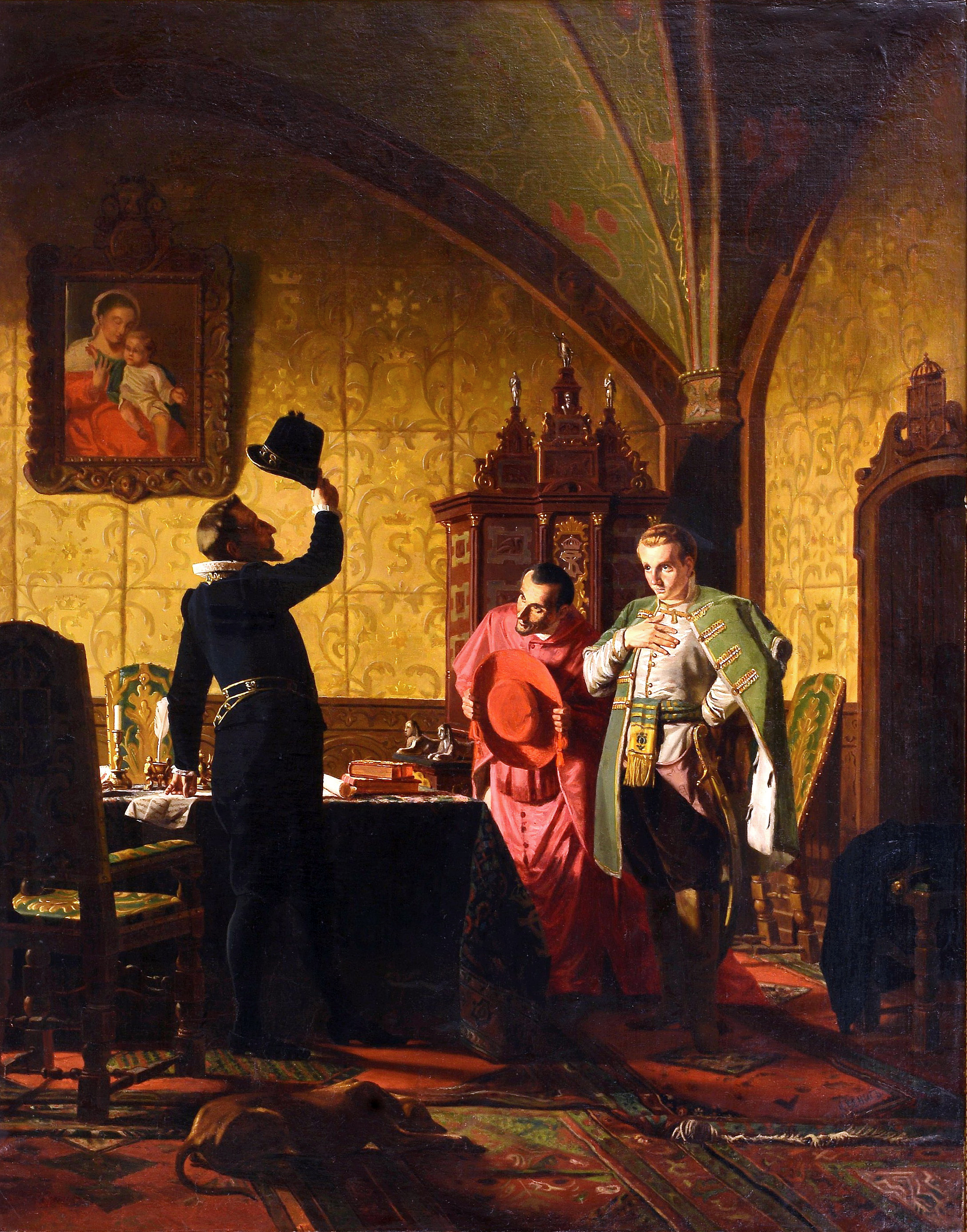
Date	February–May 1605
Location	Russia
Result	Victory of False Dmitry I

Belligerents
Army of False Dmitry I	Army of Boris Godunov

Commanders and leaders
Andrei Korela	Fedor Mstislavsky; Peter Sheremetev; Vasily Shuisky

Strength
up to 5,000	About 40,000

The siege of Kromy was the last major clash of government troops of Boris Godunov with the rebel army of False Dmitry I.

== Prelude ==
After Battle of Dobrynichy, most noblemen and mercenaries with whom False Dmitry I began his campaign left him, but under his banner, peasants and Cossacks flocked massively, dissatisfied with the rule of Godunov and who supposedly believed False Dmitry to be "the lawful sovereign".

== Siege ==
A small garrison of Kromy was reinforced by five hundred Cossacks led by the ataman Andrei Korela, who had retreated here after the Battle of Dobrynichi. The walls were destroyed by artillery fire, but the defenders of Kromy effectively defended themselves in the system of trenches, which they dug in the city. Nevertheless, the losses on both sides were high and the Ataman Korela demanded reinforcements from False Dmitry I in Putivl, threatening to surrender the city. False Dmitriy reacted by sending a large detachment to Kromy. Because the tsarist troops accepted these warriors as their own, they entered the fortress with a large train. The fighting lasted a few more weeks before the ceasefire.

In the huge camp of Mstislavsky began an epidemic of dysentery. Godunov's order not to leave the army caused indignation among the nobles, and many, despite the ban, went home.

== Aftermath ==
On April 13, 1605, Boris Godunov died and his son, Fedor, became Tsar. Many of the boyars began to look for ways to get rid of the elected Zemstvo dynasty. On May 7, most of the government army, following the agitation of the hero of the Novgorod-Seversk siege, Peter Basmanov (who took part in the conspiracy against the Godunovs), took the side of False Dmitry. Tsar Fedor II Godunov was killed by the Pretender's agents on June 10, 1605, and False Dmitry I entered Moscow as the new Tsar. His rule would last till May 17, 1606, when he would be killed and replaced by Vasili IV Shuiski.
