= Battle of Novhorod-Siverskyi =

1604 battle

- Part of Polish–Russian War (1605–1618)
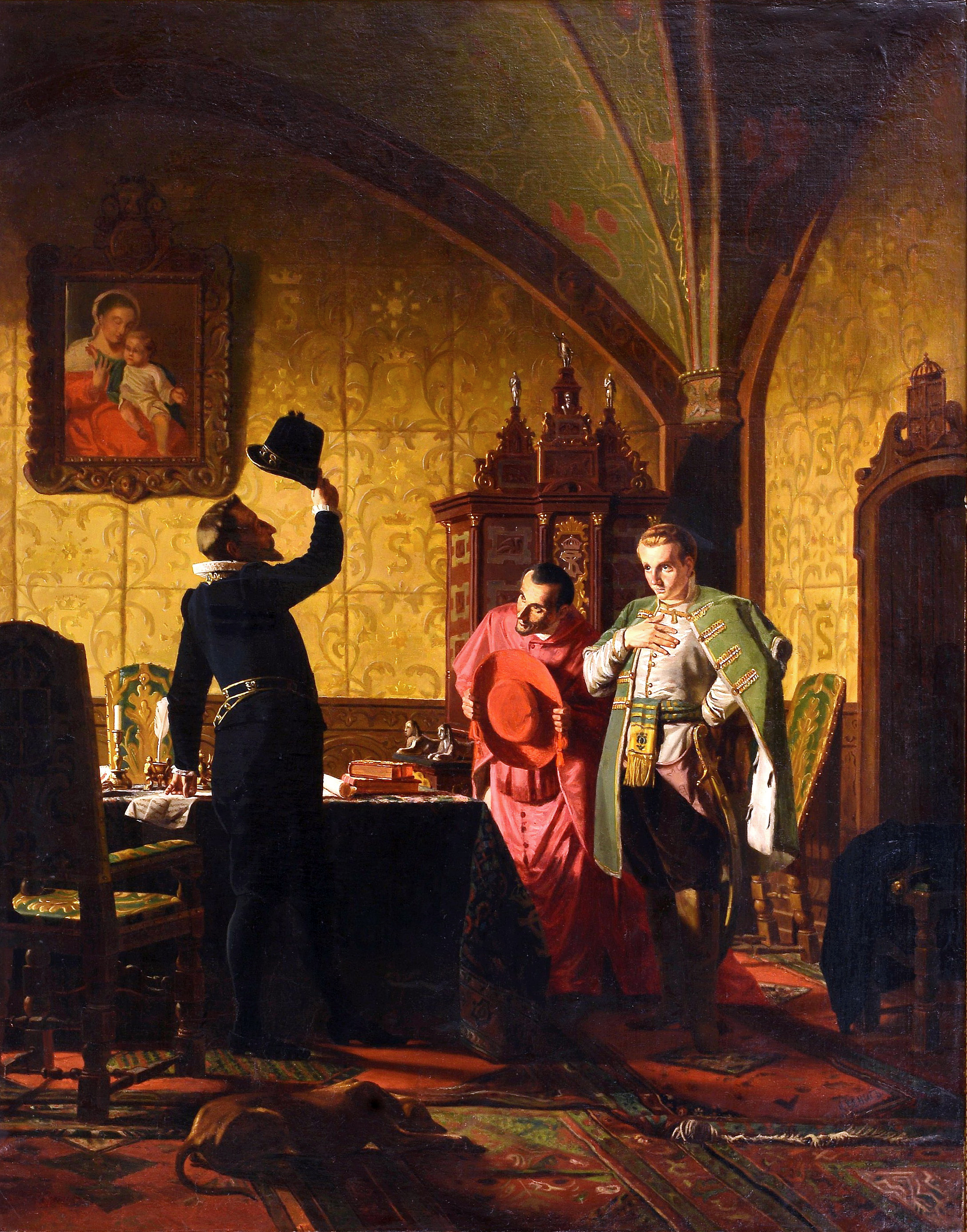
Date	December 31, 1604
Location	Novhorod-Siverskyi, Ukraine
Result	Victory for False Dmitry I, Novhorod-Siverskyi besieged

Belligerents
Army of False Dmitry I	Tsardom of Russia

Commanders and leaders
False Dmitry I	Fyodor Mstislavsky; Peter Basmanov; Nikita Trubeckoy

Strength
15,000	25,000–40,000; 1,500 in garrison of Novhorod-Siverskyi

Casualties and losses
Significant	About 4,000

The Battle of Novgorod-Seversky was the first major battle of False Dmitry I against Boris Godunov.

== Prelude ==
False Dmitry I crossed the border of the Tsardom of Russia in winter of 1604 commanding a mercenary army of Polish-Lithuanian noblemen. Many residents of southern Russian lands flocked to his banner, and the fortified cities of Chernigov and Putyvl accepted him as their "rightful sovereign".

== Siege of Novgorod Seversky ==
Novgorod Seversky was the only city that resisted False Dmitry's troops, defended by Voivode Peter Basmanov and Nikita Trubetskoi with 1,500 men and several heavy cannon. The siege began on November 21, but two major assaults were successfully repulsed.

== Battle ==
Nevertheless, the army of the impostor continued to grow to about 15.000, as new towns and cities recognized his authority. To help Basmanov, Tsar Boris Godunov sent some 25.000 servicemen (probably 40.000 including armed serfs) under Prince Fyodor Mstislavsky. But False Dmitry I took the initiative and attacked the larger Russian army on December 31, 1604, on the outskirts of the city. Polish Hussars, led personally by the impostor, routed the right wing of the Russian army, put the center in a disarray, and wounded Prince Mstislavsky himself. The Prince was saved by a counter-attack of Streltsy under Mikhail Shein, and the Russian army retreated to their fortified camp.

== Aftermath ==
The Tsar's army quickly recovered and defeated the usurper in the Battle of Dobrynichi in January 1605.
