= Ulmet =

Ulmet may refer to several villages in Romania:

- Ulmet, a village in Bozioru Commune, Buzău County
- Ulmet, a village in Stoina Commune, Gorj County
- Ulmet, a village in Dobrun Commune, Olt County

and to:

- Ulmet, Germany in Kusel district, Rhineland-Palatinate
- The Abbaye d'Ulmet, in the Camargue
