= Battle of Zaraysk =

1608 battle

Battle of Zaraisk
- Part of Polish–Muscovite War (1605–18)
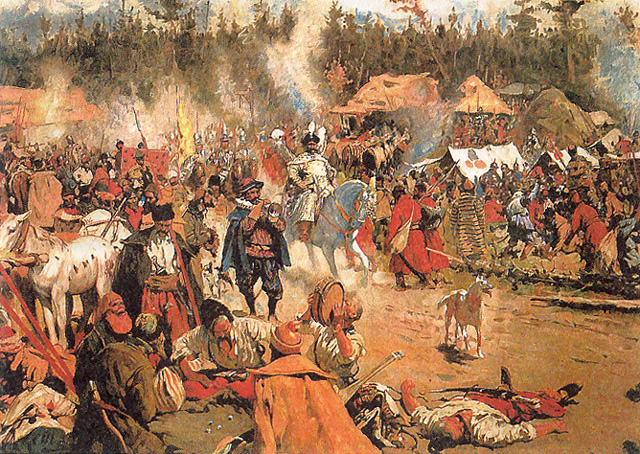
- Camp of False Dmitry II at Tushino
Date	April 9, 1608
Location	Zaraisk near Moscow
Result	Victory for False Dmitry II

Belligerents
False Dmitry II	Muscovite Tsardom

Commanders and leaders
Alexander Lisowsky	Zahari Lyapunov; Ivan Khovansky

Strength
1,500 Cossacks and Lithuanians	Several thousand from Ryazan, 250 cavalry from Arzamas

Casualties and losses
Light	Heavy

In the Battle of Zaraisk, during the Time of Troubles, on April 9, 1608, Colonel Alexander Lisovsky in service of False Dmitry II, defeated the army of Tsar Vasily IV under Zahariya Lyapunov and Ivan Khovansky.

== Prelude ==
Zaraysk was occupied without a fight by Lisovsky detachments (1,500 Cossacks: "Lithuanian people and Russian thieves"), as the city Cossacks surrendered the city and swore to the Pretender.

== Battle ==
An army from Ryazan land came out to suppress the insurrection, to which 250 elite Arzamas warriors joined. The government army carelessly besieged the fort (with no guards appointed), and the sudden sally of Lisovsky's men from the Zaraisk Kremlin scattered them with little resistance.

== Aftermath ==
After the victory at Zaraisk, Lisovskiy swiftly captured Kolomna, where he captured many heavy guns. The remnants of former Bolotnikovites strengthened the army. However, the detachment of Lisovsky, heavily burdened by the convoy, was defeated by the Tsar's army at Medvezhiy Brod.
