= Polish–Lithuanian–Muscovite Commonwealth =

Proposed state merger

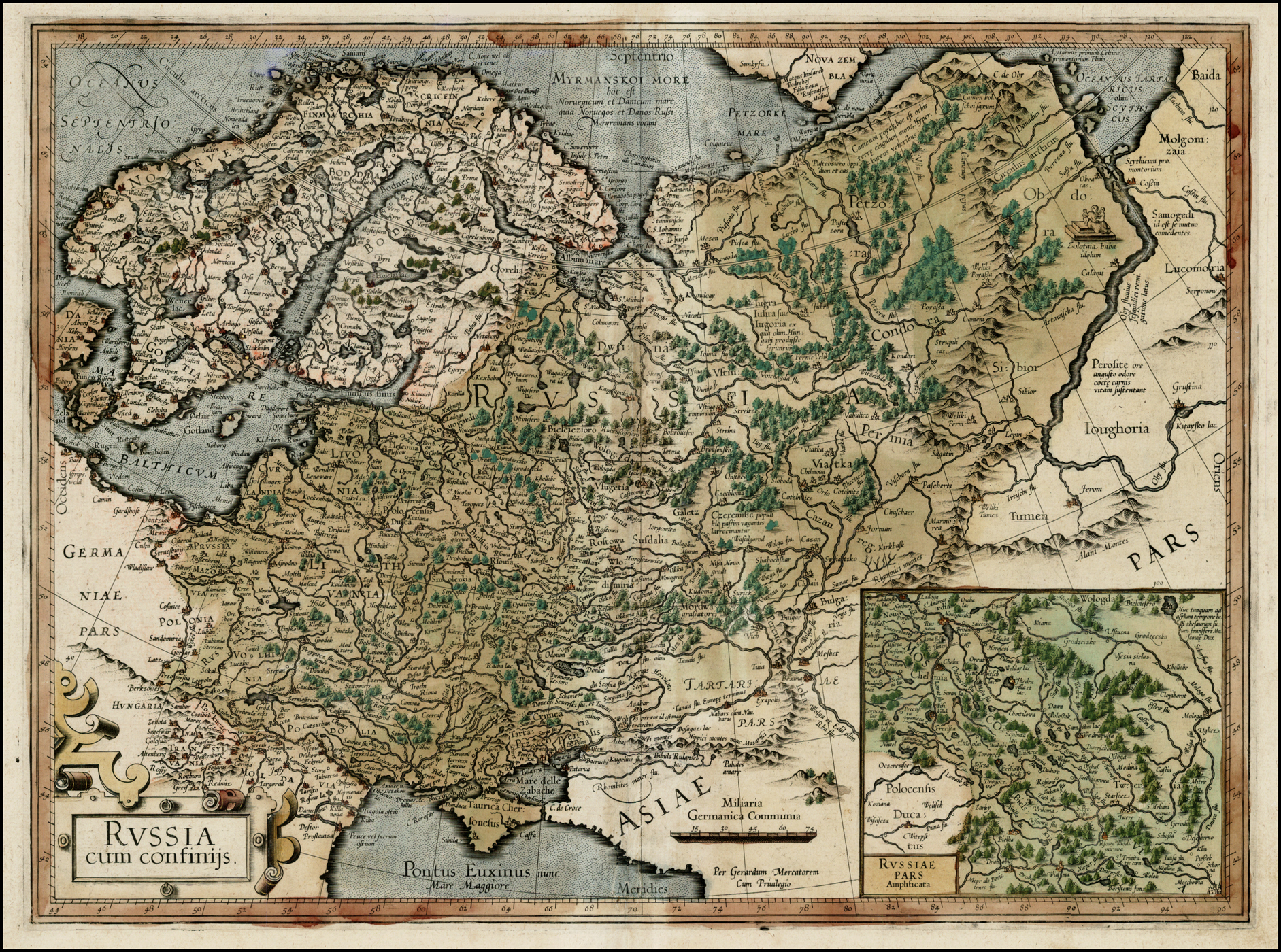
Map showing Russia and Poland in 1595

The Polish–Lithuanian–Muscovite Commonwealth was a proposed state that would have been based on a personal union between the Polish–Lithuanian Commonwealth and the Tsardom of Russia. A number of serious attempts by various means to create such a union took place between 1574 and 1658 and in the late 18th century, but it never materialized because of the incompatible demands from both sides.

The proposed union is known in Polish as the Triple Union (unia troista) and has also been called the Polish–Russian Union (unia polsko-rosyjska) or the Polish–Muscovite Union (unia polsko-moskiewska).

== Rationale ==
Proponents of such a union among the Polish szlachta and Lithuanian nobility, including the influential secular thinkers Jan Zamoyski and Lew Sapieha, had listed several arguments in its favour: peace on the turbulent eastern border, a powerful military ally and relatively sparsely populated territories (compared to the Commonwealth) for colonisation and serfdom. The idea was also supported by the Jesuits and other papal emissaries, who never ceased to entertain the idea of bringing Eastern Orthodox Russia into the Catholic fold. Some of the Russian Boyars found the proposal attractive (like Boris Godunov, a supporter of Czar Feodor I's candidacy) for various reasons, such as the fact that the Golden Freedoms of the Commonwealth, if applied in Russia, would weaken Czar's power and thus grant them a much higher status than enjoyed previously.

The proposals then revolved around introducing a personal union between the Commonwealth and Russia and various economic and political agreements (elimination of trade barriers, free movement of people etc.) up to the creation of one country by using the framework of that led to the creation of the Polish–Lithuanian Commonwealth in the first place (Union of Lublin of 1569). However, all proposals presented by the Polish-Lithuanian side were rejected by the Russian Czar. The most promising negotiations took place during 1600, when a Polish-Lithuanian diplomatic mission, led by Lew Sapieha, arrived in Moscow. Sapieha presented to Boris Godunov an elaborated idea of a union between Poland–Lithuania and Russia. The subjects of both rulers were to be free to serve the other ruler, travel to the other country, contract marriages with the other ruler's subjects, own land and go study in the other country.

Although Moscow was willing to agree to some parts of the proposed treaties (like extradition of crime suspects), it strictly opposed points on religious tolerance (non-Orthodox religions, especially Catholicism, were persecuted in Russia, unlike in Commonwealth, which allowed all faiths to be preached) and free movement of people (according to Polish scholars). To transform the Russian Czardom into a republic modelled on the Polish–Lithuanian Commonwealth would have proven to be a too ambitious project. Many Russians were afraid of Polonization, which was already occurring with the Lithuanian and the Ruthenian nobility, and a growing danger stemming from the increasing number of peasant and even noble refugees escaping the Russian Empire, to which Russian Czar Ivan responded with the policy of violent repressions, the so-called oprichnina. The Union of Brest of 1596 was a further argument for the Orthodox opponents of the closer ties between Russia and the Commonwealth, who argued that it was the prelude to the Catholicisation of Russia.

== History ==
=== Polish-Lithuanian succession ===
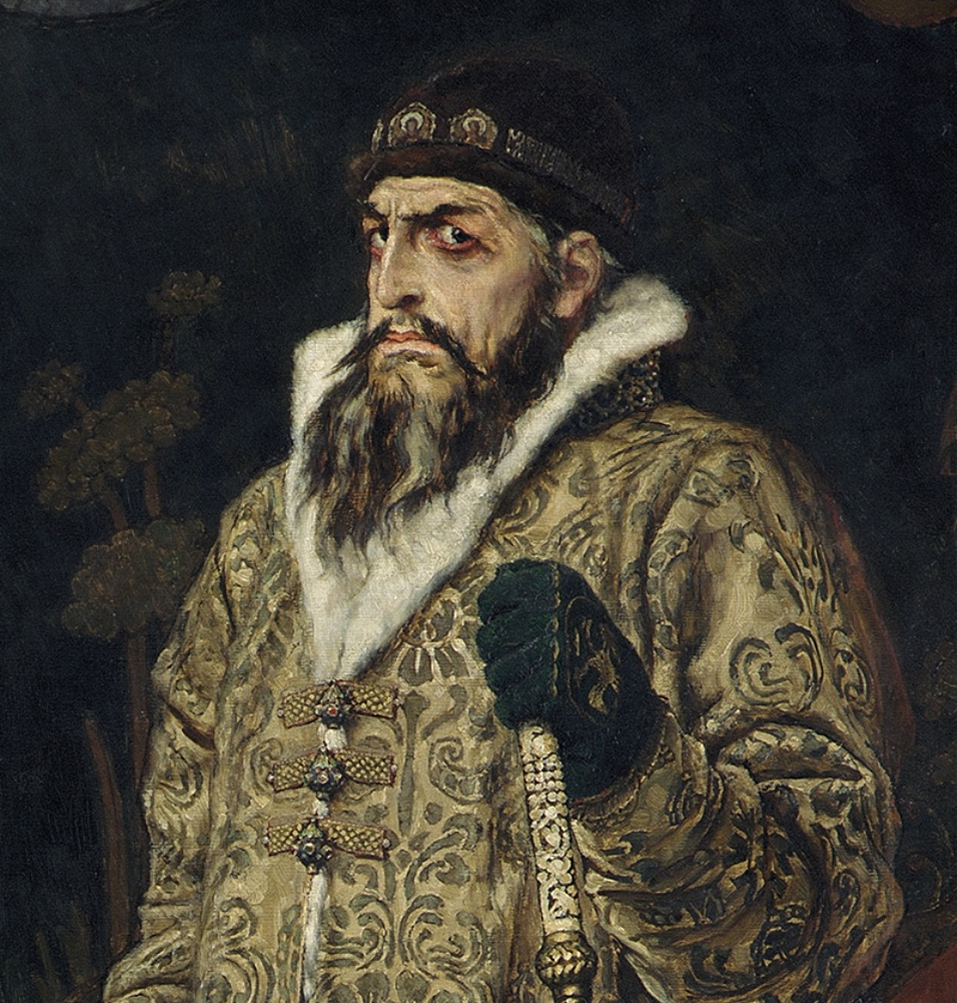
Ivan IV of Russia was a candidate for the Polish throne.

The idea was first broached in the 16th century, after the death of the last King of Poland and Grand Duke of Lithuania of the Jagiellon dynasty, Sigismund II Augustus. Czar Ivan IV of Russia ("the Terrible") became a popular candidate among the Polish nobility. He had substantial support in Poland, especially among the lesser and the middle nobility, which saw in him an opportunity to limit the growing power of the Polish-Lithuanian magnates. During the interregnum, two diplomatic missions (led by Great Scribe of Lithuania Michał Harraburda and Jędrzej Taranowski) were sent to Moscow to hold discussions. The negotiations failed because of hostilities resulting from the Livonian War, territorial demands by Ivan (who wanted former territories of Kievan Rus', which was under the control of Lithuania) and the decision by Ivan that the Russian side would not "lower itself to the level of other European monarchies and send a diplomatic mission to Poland begging for him to become a king". During the second interregnum, in 1574, the candidature of Ivan IV was even highly regarded in Poland, but the Moscow diplomatic mission that arrived in Poland had no orders or prerogatives to negotiate that matter. Eventually, the disappointed pro-Ivan faction, represented by Jan Sierakowski, issued a statement in the Sejm: "The Great Prince of Muscovy would be the best choice for king, but because of his silence we are forced to forget him and should not mention him again".

=== Russian succession ===
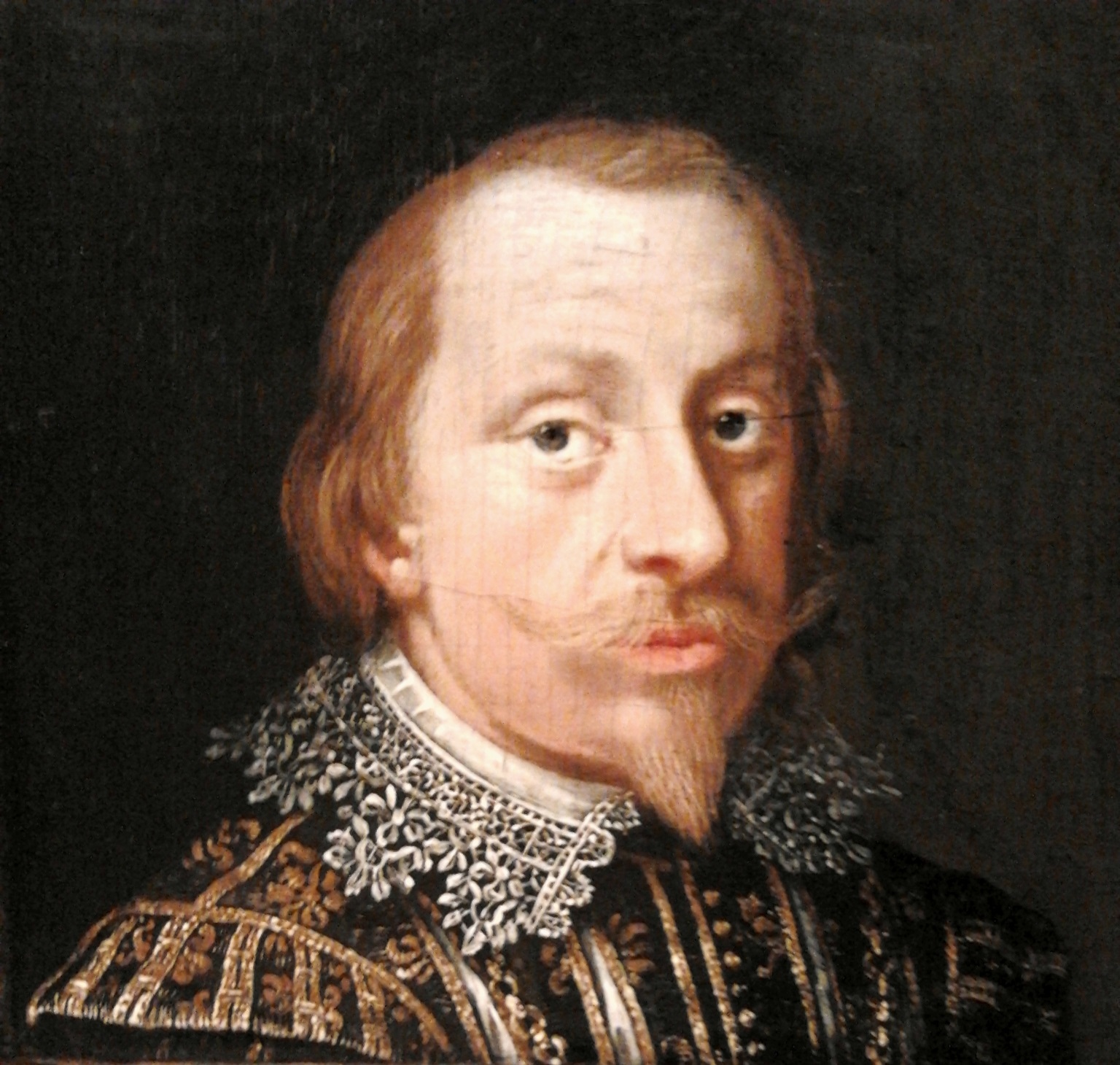
Władysław Vasa of Poland claimed the Russian throne.

The mixed circle of proponents of the idea saw an opportunity in Russia after the death of Ivan the Terrible, the last Russian ruler of the time whose legitimacy was never questioned. The proposal was revived soon after Ivan's death through the reigns of Stefan Batory in the Commonwealth and Feodor I in Russia. After Batory's death in 1587, Feodor I became interested in acquiring the Polish-Lithuanian throne and sent a diplomatic mission to Poland. His support among the Lithuanians was high, but Poles issued several demands, such as requiring Fedors's conversion to Catholicism, an entirely unthinkable event. Eventually, Sigismund III Vasa was elected the king of Poland and grand duke of Lithuania. The death of Feodor prompted Sigismund to propose his candidacy for the Moscow throne, but by the time the diplomatic mission arrived in Moscow, Boris Godunov had been elected as the new Czar.

With the legitimacy issues clouding the entire period of the rule of Boris Godunov, Russia submerged into even greater chaos upon his death, the Russian Time of Troubles, which was accompanied by a decisive Polish-Lithuanian armed intervention, the Polish–Muscovite War (1605–1618). In the course of the Polish–Muscovite War, the Polish-Lithuanian prince (later king), Władysław IV Vasa, was briefly elected a Russian Czar among other such strange developments like the enthronement and the brief reign of False Dmitriy I, an impostor of Czar Ivan's son. However, Wladyslaw was never officially enthroned, and his quick election remained in history as one of the fluke events of the Time of Troubles.

The idea was again proposed in 1656 to 1658, when Moscow suggested that one of the points of negotiations would be the election of the Russian Czar for the Polish-Lithuanian throne. This time, it was the Polish side that presented demands (conversion to Catholicism and territorial changes) that eventually discouraged Russians from pursuing the project. In 1658, the Sejm elected Tsar Alexis I as King, but the decision was annulled by the protest of the Catholic church.

=== Proposal of the last Commonwealth's king ===
Finally, the idea returned in the 18th century, when the last Polish king and Lithuanian grand duke, Stanisław August Poniatowski, attempted to save the Commonwealth by proposing a marriage between himself and Russian Empress Catherine the Great.

The very possibility that such an idea could have been seriously considered by the Polish side early on was likely based on the spirit of the 1573 Warsaw Confederation (Warsaw Compact), which guaranteed, at least formally, equality for non-Catholic nobles in the Commonwealth. However, the adopted convention was an unprecedentedly liberal act for its time, such full equality was never achieved in reality even within the Commonwealth itself. Taking into account that most divisions of the time, if not dynastic ones, were religious and the relationship between the Catholic and the Eastern Orthodox branches of Christianities were strained at best, it remains surprising that such an idea was seriously considered at all. It remains equally unlikely that such an idea could have been accepted by the Russian side because the view towards Catholicism in the Russian Empire was highly negative.

Thus, while the idea of a Polish–Lithuanian–Muscovite Commonwealth was supported early on by some progressive and secular Polish diplomats, the efforts of the few could not in the end overcome Russian opposition to Catholicism and the fear that such a union would spell Catholic domination over Orthodoxy.

== See also ==
- Polish–Lithuanian–Ruthenian Commonwealth
- Congress Poland, the Polish-Lithuanian Commonwealth as part of Russia

== Sources ==
- K. Tyszkowski, Plany unii polsko-moskiewskiej na przełomie XVI i XVII wieku, "Przegląd Współczesny", t. XXIV, 1928, s.392-402
- K. Tyszkowski, Poselstwo Lwa Sapieha do Moskwy, Lwów, 1929
- S. Gruszewski, Idea unii polsko-rosyjskiej na przełomie XVI i XVII wieku, "Odrodzenie i Reformacja w Polsce", t. XV, 1970, s.89-99
- Ł.A. Derbow, K woprosu o kandidatiure Iwana IV na polskij prestoł (1572-1576), "Uczonyje zapiski Saratowskowo uniwersiteta", t. XXXIX, Saratow, 1954
- B.Flora, Rosyjska kandydatura na tron polski u schyłku XVI wieku, "Odrodzenie i Reformacja w Polsce"', t. XVI, 1971, s.85-95
- Krzysztof Rak, Federalism or Force: A Sixteenth-Century Project for Eastern and Central Europe, Sarmatian Review, January 2006
- Zbigniew Wojcik, Russian Endeavors for the Polish Crown in the Seventeenth Century, Slavic Review, Vol. 41, No. 1 (Spring, 1982), pp. 59–72 JSTOR
