= Dobrun, Suzemsky District, Bryansk Oblast =

Rural locality in Suzemsky District, Bryansk Oblast, Russia

Coordinates: 52°15′51″N 34°21′2″E

Dobrun (Russian: Добру́нь) is a rural locality (a selo) in Suzemsky District of Bryansk Oblast, Russia, located 20 kilometers (12 mi) northwest of Sevsk.

== History ==
The village was first mentioned in the cadastres Svensk monastery near 1595 as the existing settlement. Dobrynichi (Добры́ничи). On January 25 (February 4), 1605 near the village of was a major battle troops led by Prince FI Mstsislauye with an army of False Dmitriy I (known as the Battle of Dobrynichi), after which in the vicinity of the village for centuries preserved burial mounds (Kurgan) with fraternal burials.

Until the end of the 18th century palace had possession. In the 19th century the village had a distillery.
