= Dobrun, Sevsky District, Bryansk Oblast =

Dobrun Добрунь
- Settlement
- Location within Bryansk Oblast Location within Russia
- Coordinates: 52°15′N 34°21′E
- Country: Russia
- Region: Bryansk Oblast
- District: Sevsky District
- Time zone: UTC+3:00

Dobrun (Russian: Добрунь) is a rural locality (a settlement) in Sevsky District, Bryansk Oblast, Russia. The population was 104 as of 2013. There are 2 streets.

== Geography ==
Dobrun is located 17 km north of Sevsk (the district's administrative centre) by road. Zaulye is the nearest rural locality.
