= Battle of Medvezhiy Brod =

1608 battle

Battle of Bear's Ford
- Part of Polish–Muscovite War (1605–18)
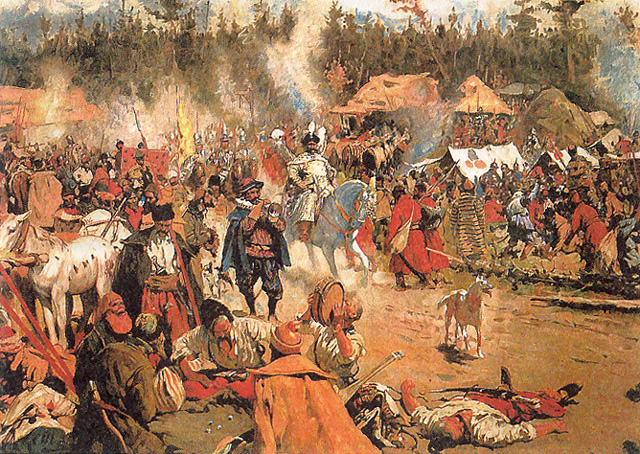
- Camp of False Dmitry II at Tushino
Date	June 1608
Location	Moscow River between Moscow and Kolomna
Result	Victory for Tsar Vasily IV

Belligerents
False Dmitry II	Muscovite Tsardom

Commanders and leaders
Alexander Lisovsky	Ivan Kurakin

The battle of the Bear's Ford took place in June 1608, when a government army of Boyar Ivan Kurakin defeated Lithuanian Colonel Alexander Lisowsky, in service of False Dmitry II.

== Prelude ==
In March 1608, Lisowski separated from False Dmitry, defeated government troops at Zaraisk and captured Kolomna. With captured cannon and prisoners, Lisowski moved to join the main forces of False Dmitry in Tushino.

== Battle ==
While crossing the Moskva River between Kolomna and Moscow, burdened with captives and a wagon train, Lisowczycy was suddenly attacked by an elite cavalry regiment loyal to Tsar Vasily IV. Accustomed to maneuvering battles, Lisowczycy suffered a serious defeat and lost all of the Kolomna spoils.

== Aftermath ==
After this defeat, Lisowczycy escaped back to Tushino. False Dmitry II lost important siege equipment and could not attack fortified Moscow, but continued blockade instead.
