= Battle of Dobrynichi =

1605 battle

- Part of Polish–Muscovite War (1605–1618)
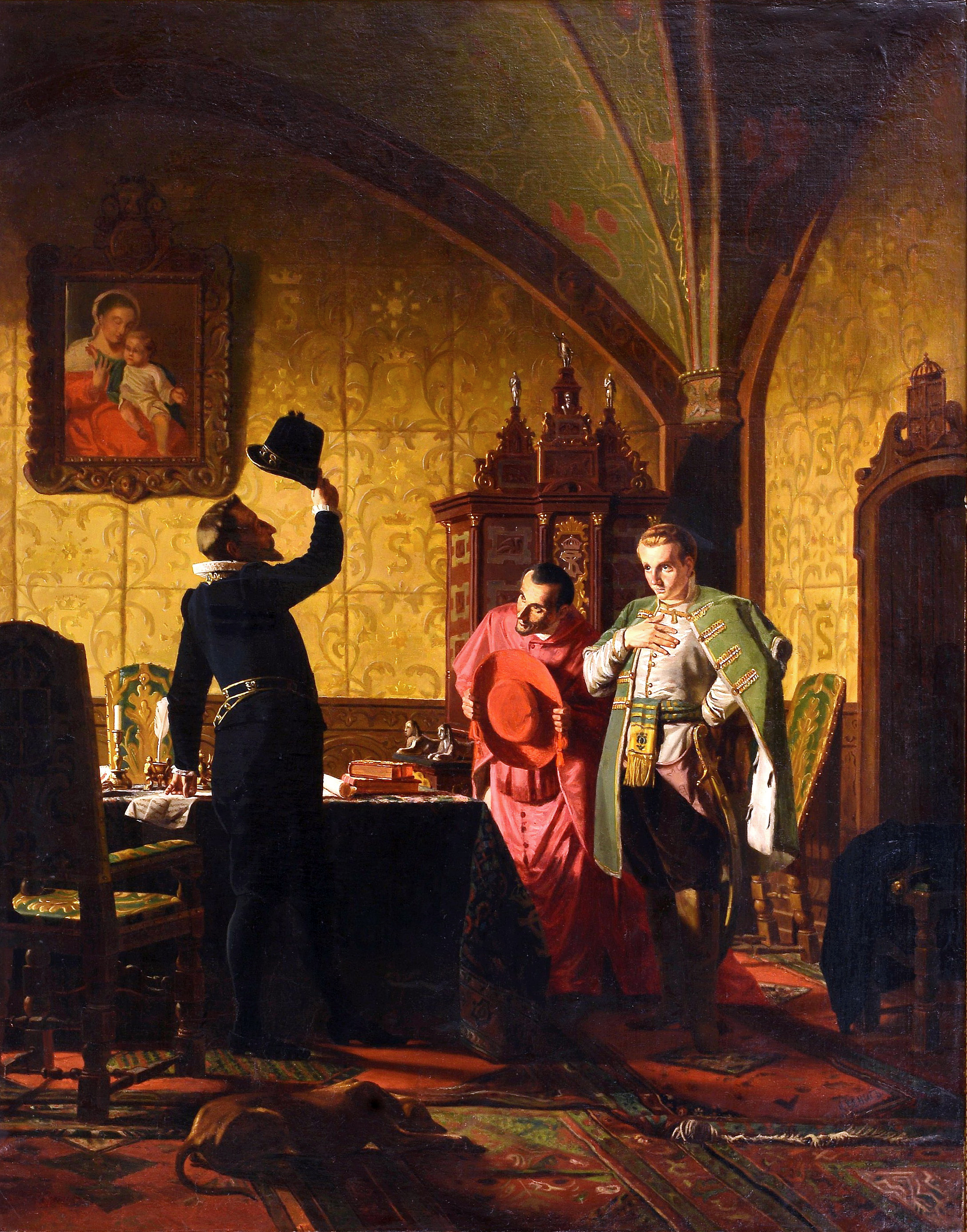
Date	21 January 1605
Location	Near Dobrynichi, Russia 52°16′56″N 34°20′30″E
Result	Russian victory

Belligerents
Army of False Dmitry I	Tsardom of Russia

Commanders and leaders
False Dmitry I	Fyodor Mstislavsky

Strength
23,000	20,000

Casualties and losses
8,000	6,000

The Battle of Dobrynichi took place on 21 January 1605 between the armies of False Dmitry I and Fyodor Mstislavsky near the village of Dobrynichi (today's Bryansk Oblast in Russia).

== Prelude ==
Fyodor Mstislavsky commanded an army of some 20,000 soldiers, while False Dmitriy I had some 23,000 men at his disposal. The impostor found out that Boris Godunov's army had been deployed near the small village of Dobrynichi and made a decision to attack it at once, first sending his men to set the village on fire. The Russian patrol, however, was able to capture the incendiaries and warn the rest of the army of the oncoming enemy forces, thus giving the Russian army some time to prepare for the battle.

== Battle ==
False Dmitriy I attacked the Russian regiment on watch with his main forces (consisting of Polish chorągiews and Russian cavalry) and threw it back to Dobrynichi. His plan was to force the right flank of the Russian army to retreat beyond the Sev River. Fyodor Mstislavsky ordered his right flank (consisting of German and Dutch mercenaries and Russian cavalry) to assume the offensive in order to stop and overrun the enemy. The impostor's cavalry was able to press the mercenaries and throw back the Russian cavalry. Then, he attacked the center of Mstislavsky's army, namely the Streltsy, who had been dislocated in Dobrynichi. The latter met Dmitriy's cavalry with gunfire from harquebuses and cannons and put them to flight. At the sight of the fleeing cavalry, unmounted Zaporozhian Cossacks on the right flank of Dmitriy's army decided that the battle had been lost and followed suit.

The Russian cavalry decided to counter-attack the fleeing enemy horsemen and foot soldiers and crushed them completely. Dmitriy's reserve, consisting of an unmounted unit of the Don Cossacks and artillery, was surrounded and almost utterly destroyed. The Russian army chased the remains of the impostor's forces for 8 km, but he managed to retreat to Rylsk.

== Aftermath ==
After the main battle the Siege of Kromy, where a group of Cossacks were hiding, followed.
