= Polish–Russian War (1609–1618) =

War between Russia and Poland-Lithuania Commonwealth

Polish-Russian War
- Part of the Time of Troubles and the Russo-Polish Wars
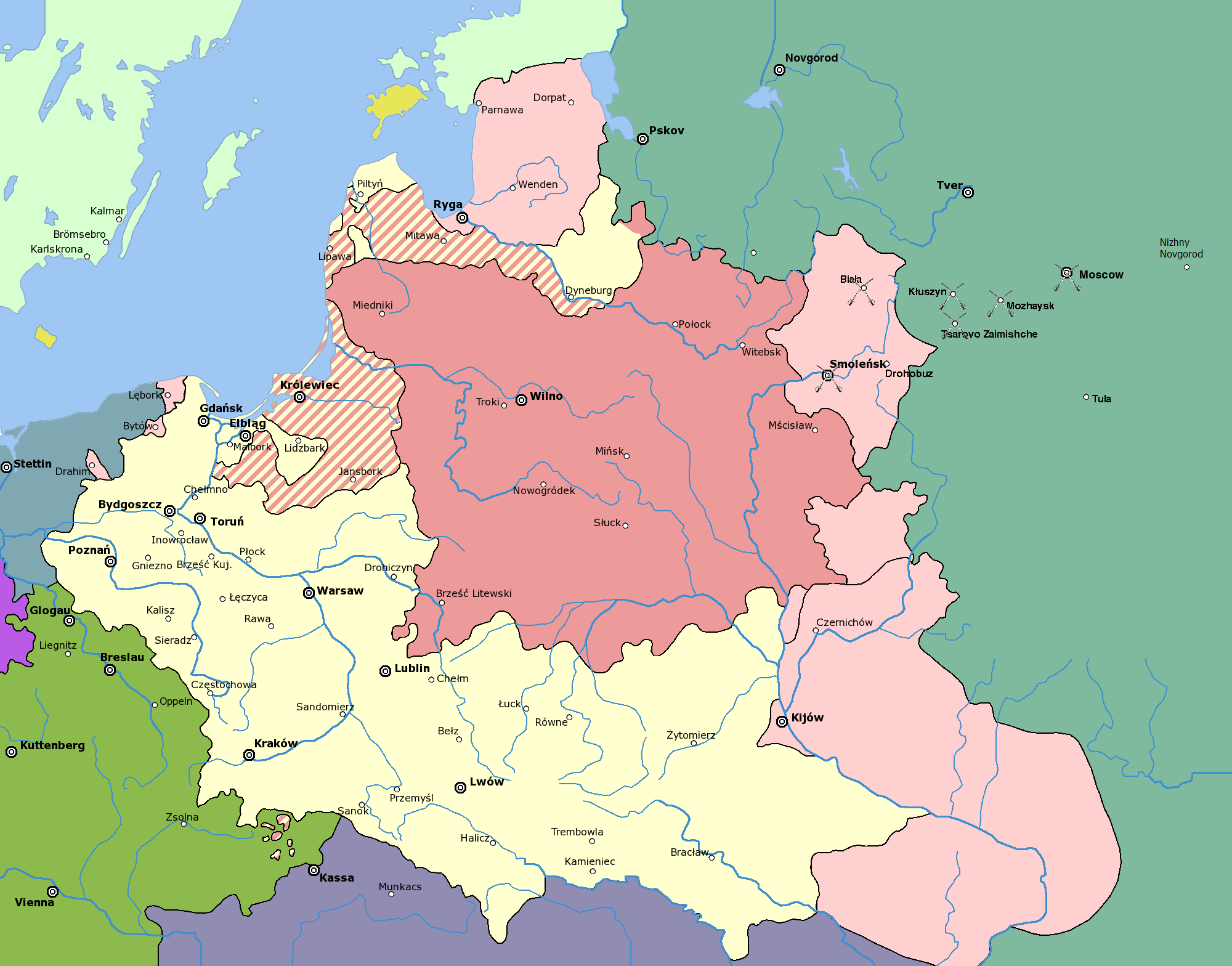
- Poland–Lithuania and western Russia during the Polish–Russian War. The map shows Poland (cream), Lithuania (dark red), Russia (dark green), and Polish territorial gains or areas temporarily controlled by Poland (pink). Positions of military regiments and important battles are marked with crossed sabres.
Date	1609–1618
Location	Poland–Lithuania; Russia
Result	Polish–Lithuanian victory (Truce of Deulino)
Territorial changes	Poland–Lithuania gains Severia, Chernihiv and Smolensk

Belligerents
Polish–Lithuanian Commonwealth; Zaporozhian Cossacks	Tsardom of Russia; Kingdom of Sweden (Note: 1609–1610)

Commanders and leaders
(Polish–Lithuanian Commonwealth) Sigismund III; (Polish–Lithuanian Commonwealth) Władysław IV; (Polish–Lithuanian Commonwealth) Stanisław Żółkiewski; (Polish–Lithuanian Commonwealth) Jan Karol Chodkiewicz; Petro Sahaidachny	(Tsardom of Russia) Vasili IV (POW) #; (Tsardom of Russia) Mikhail Skopin-Shuisky #; (Tsardom of Russia) Dmitry Pozharsky; (Tsardom of Russia) Kuzma Minin #; Jacob De la Gardie

The Polish–Russian War (Note: Also known as the Polish–Muscovite War and the Polish Intervention in Russia.) was a conflict fought between the Polish–Lithuanian Commonwealth and the Tsardom of Russia from 1609 to 1618.

Russia had been experiencing the Time of Troubles since the death of Tsar Feodor I in 1598, which caused political instability and a violent succession crisis upon the extinction of the Rurik dynasty; furthermore, a major famine ravaged the country from 1601 to 1603. Poland exploited Russia's civil wars when powerful members of the Polish szlachta began influencing Russian boyars and supporting successive pretenders to the title of tsar of Russia against the crowned tsars Boris Godunov (r. 1598–1605) and Vasili IV Shuysky (r. 1606–1610).

From 1605, Polish nobles conducted a series of skirmishes until the death of False Dmitry I in 1606, and they invaded again in 1607 until Russia formed a military alliance with Sweden two years later. The King of Poland, Sigismund III Vasa, declared war on Russia in response in 1609, aiming to gain territorial concessions and to weaken Sweden's ally. Polish forces won many early victories such as the 1610 Battle of Klushino. In 1610, Polish units entered Moscow and Sweden withdrew from the military alliance with Russia, instead triggering the Ingrian War of 1610-1617 between Sweden and Russia.

Sigismund's son, Prince Władysław of Poland, was elected tsar of Russia by the Seven Boyars in September 1610, but Sigismund refused to allow his son to become the new tsar unless the Muscovites agreed to convert from Eastern Orthodoxy to Catholicism, and the pro-Polish boyars ended their support for the Polish–Lithuanian Commonwealth. In 1611, Kuzma Minin and Prince Dmitry Pozharsky formed a new army to launch a popular revolt against the Polish occupation. The Poles captured Smolensk in June 1611, but began to retreat after they were ousted from Moscow in September 1612. In March 1613 the Russian Zemsky Sobor elected Michael Romanov, the son of Patriarch Filaret of Moscow, as tsar of Russia, thus inaugurating the Romanov dynasty and ending the Time of Troubles. With little military action between 1612 and 1617, the war finally ended in 1618 with the Truce of Deulino, which granted the Polish–Lithuanian Commonwealth certain territorial concessions but preserved Russia's independence.

The war was the first major sign of the rivalry and uneasy relations between Poland and Russia which would last for centuries. Its aftermath had a long-lasting impact on Russian society, fostering a negative stereotype of Poland among Russians and, most notably, giving rise to the Romanov dynasty which ruled Russia for three centuries until the February Revolution in 1917. It also left a noticeable mark on Russian culture, with renowned writers and composers portraying the war in works such as the play Boris Godunov by Alexander Pushkin (adapted into an opera by Modest Mussorgsky), other operas including A Life for the Tsar by Mikhail Glinka and Pan Voyevoda by Nikolai Rimsky-Korsakov as well as films such as Minin and Pozharsky (1939) and 1612 (2007).

== Name ==
In Polish historiography, two military interventions immediately preceding the war, the aim of which was to place a tsar loyal to the Polish-Lithuanian Commonwealth on the Russian throne are called the Dimitriads and are considered a separate conflict: the First Dymitriad (1604–1606) and Second Dymitriad (1607–1609). The Polish–Russian War (1609–1618) can subsequently be divided into two wars of 1609–1611 and 1617–1618, and may or may not include the 1617–1618 campaign, which is sometimes referred to as Chodkiewicz [Muscovite] Campaign. According to Russian historiography, the chaotic events of the war fall into the "Time of Troubles". The conflict with Poles is commonly called the Polish Invasion, Polish Intervention, or more specifically the Polish Intervention of the Early Seventeenth Century.

== Background ==
=== Prelude to invasions ===
In the late 16th and early 17th centuries, Russia was in a state of political and economic crisis. After the death of Tsar Ivan IV ("the Terrible") in 1584, and the death of his son Dimitri in 1591, several factions competed for the tsar's throne. In 1598, Boris Godunov was crowned to the Russian throne, marking the end of the centuries long rule of the Rurik dynasty. While his policies were rather moderate and well-intentioned, his rule was marred by the general perception of its questionable legitimacy and allegations of his involvement in orchestrating the assassination of Dimitri. While Godunov managed to put the opposition to his rule under control, he did not manage to crush it completely. To add to his troubles, the first years of the 17th century were exceptionally cold. The drop in temperature was felt all over the world and was most likely caused by a severe eruption of a volcano in South America. In Russia, it resulted in a great famine that swept through the country from 1601 to 1603.

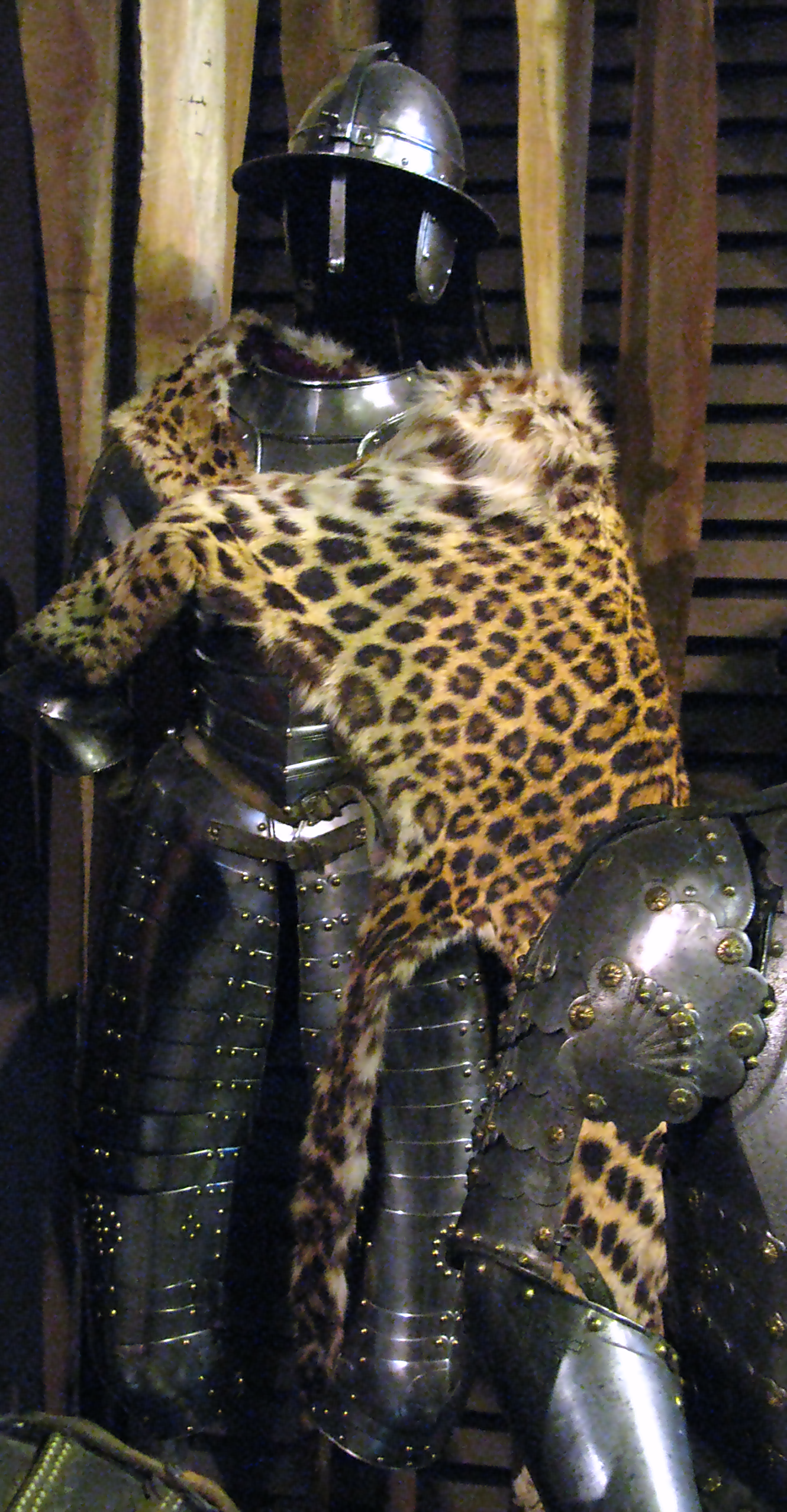
Polish cavalry armour from the 16th or 17th century

In late 1600, a Polish diplomatic mission led by Chancellor Lew Sapieha with Eliasz Pielgrzymowski and Stanisław Warszycki arrived in Moscow and proposed an alliance between the Commonwealth and Russia, which would include a future personal union. They proposed that after one monarch's death without heirs, the other would become the ruler of both countries. However, Tsar Godunov declined the union proposal and settled on extending the Treaty of Jam Zapolski, which ended the Lithuanian wars of the 16th century, by 22 years (to 1622).

Sigismund and the Commonwealth magnates knew full well that they were not capable of any serious invasion of Russia; the Commonwealth army was too small, its treasury always empty, and the war lacked popular support. However, as the situation in Russia deteriorated, Sigismund and many Commonwealth magnates, especially those with estates and forces near the Russian border, began to look for a way to profit from the chaos and weakness of their eastern neighbour. This proved easy, as in the meantime many Russian boyars, disgruntled by the ongoing civil war, tried to entice various neighbors, including the Polish–Lithuanian Commonwealth, into intervening. Some looked to their own profits, trying to organize support for their own ascension to the Russian throne. Others looked to their western neighbor, the Commonwealth, and its attractive Golden Freedoms, and together with some Polish politicians planned for some kind of union between those two states. Others tried to tie their fates with Sweden in what became known as the De la Gardie Campaign and the Ingrian War.

Advocates for a union of Poland–Lithuania with Russia proposed a plan similar to the original Polish–Lithuanian Union of Lublin involving a common foreign policy and military; the right for nobility to choose the place where they would live and to buy landed estates; removal of barriers for trade and transit; introduction of a single currency; increased religious tolerance in Russia (especially the right to build churches of non-Orthodox faiths); and the sending of boyar children for education in more developed Polish academies (such as Jagiellonian University). However, this project never gained much support. Many boyars feared that the union with the predominantly Catholic Kingdom of Poland and the Grand Duchy of Lithuania would endanger Russia's Orthodox traditions and opposed anything that threatened Russian culture, especially the policies aimed at curtailing the influence of the Orthodox Church, intermarriage and education in Polish schools that had already led to successful Polonization of the Ruthenian lands under Polish control.

=== Polish invasion (1604–1606) ===
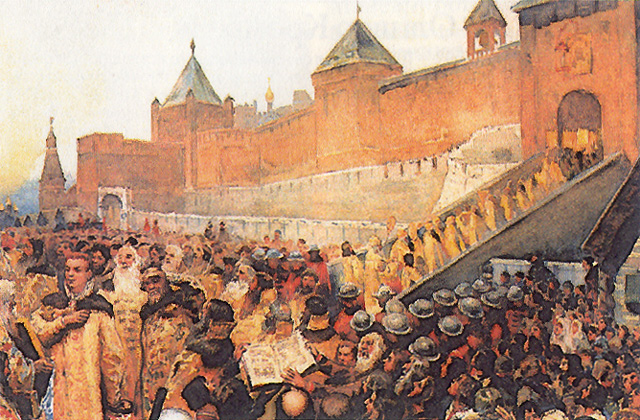
False Dmitry enters Moscow on 20 June 1605. Painting by Klavdiy Lebedev.

For most of the 17th century, Sigismund III was occupied with internal problems of his own, like the Nobles' Rebellion in the Commonwealth and the wars with Sweden and in Moldavia. However, the impostor False Dmitry I appeared in Poland in 1603 and soon found enough support among powerful magnates such as Michał Wiśniowiecki, Lew, and Jan Piotr Sapieha, who provided him with funds for a campaign against Godunov. Commonwealth magnates looked forward to material gains from the campaign and control over Russia through False Dmitriy. In addition, both Polish magnates and Russian boyars advanced plans for a union between the Commonwealth and Russia, similar to the one Lew Sapieha had discussed in 1600 (when the idea had been dismissed by Godunov). Finally, the proponents of Catholicism saw in Dmitry a tool to spread the influence of their Church eastwards, and after promises of a united Catholic dominated Russo-Polish entity waging a war on the Ottoman Empire, Jesuits also provided him with funds and education. Although Sigismund declined to support Dmitry officially with the full might of the Commonwealth, the Polish king was always happy to support pro-Catholic initiatives and provided him with the sum of 4,000 zlotys–enough for a few hundred soldiers. Nonetheless, some of Dmitriy's supporters, especially among those involved in the rebellion, actively worked to have Dmitry replace Sigismund. In exchange, in June 1604, Dmitry promised the Commonwealth "half of Smolensk territory". Many were skeptical about the future of this endeavor. Jan Zamoyski, opposed to most of Sigismund's policies, later referred to the entire False Dmitry I affair as a "comedy worthy of Plautus or Terentius".

When Boris Godunov heard about the pretender, he claimed that the man was just a runaway monk called Grigory Otrepyev, although on what information he based this claim is unclear. Godunov's support among the Russians began to wane, especially when he tried to spread counter-rumors. Some of the Russian boyars also claimed to accept Dmitry as such support gave them legitimate reasons not to pay taxes to Godunov.

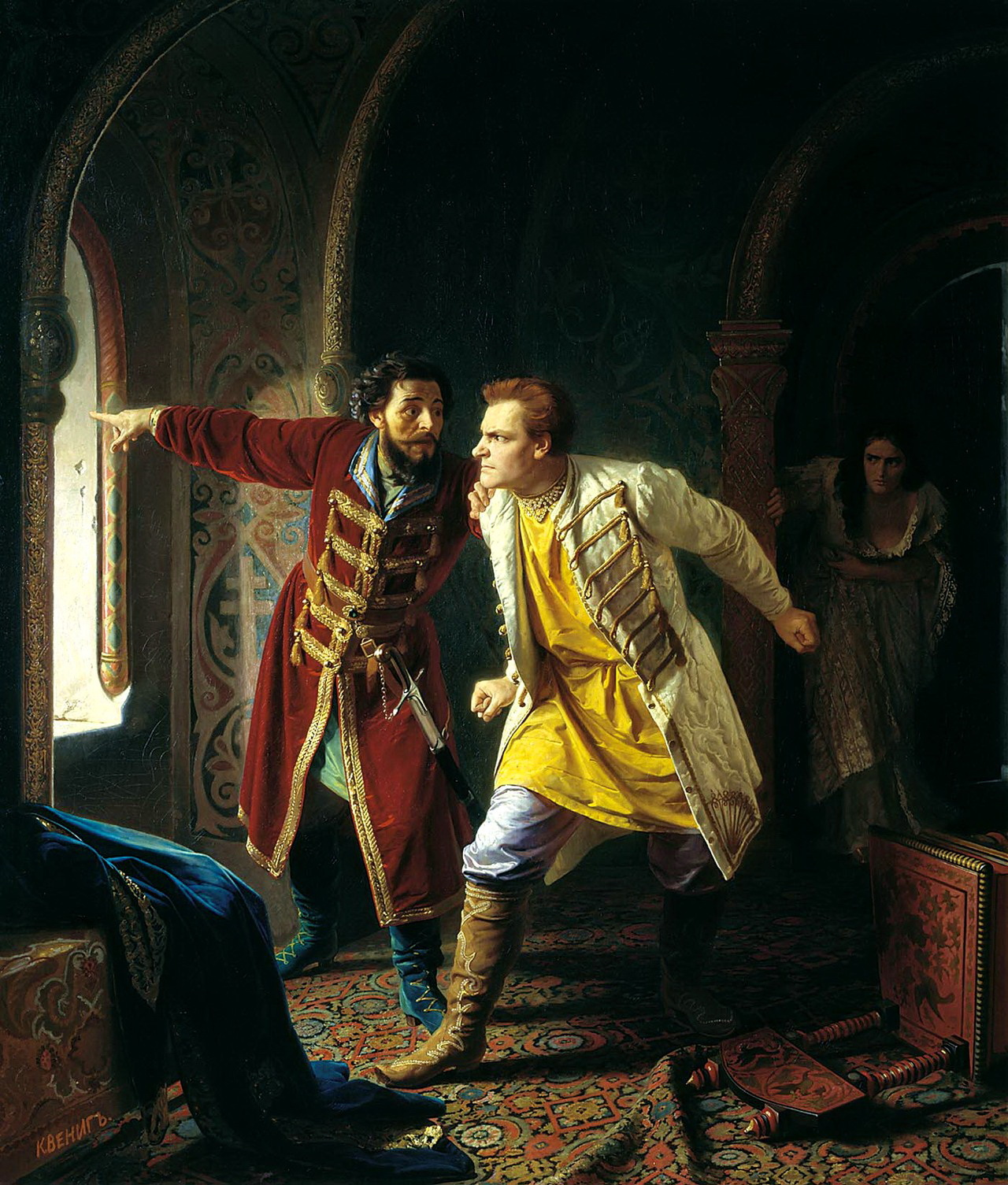
Last minutes of False Dmitry I by Carl Wenig, painted in 1879. False Dmitry tried to flee from the plotters through a window but broke his leg and was shot. After cremation his ashes were shot from a cannon towards Poland.

Dmitry attracted a number of followers, formed a small army, and, supported by approximately 3500 soldiers of the Commonwealth magnates' private armies and the mercenaries bought by Dmitriy's own cash, rode to Russia in June 1604. Some of Godunov's other enemies, including approximately 2,000 southern Cossacks, joined Dimitry's forces on his way to Moscow. Dmitriy's forces fought two engagements with reluctant Russian soldiers; his army won the first at Novhorod-Siverskyi, soon capturing Chernigov, Putivl, Sevsk, and Kursk, but badly lost the second Battle of Dobrynichi and nearly disintegrated. Dmitry's cause was only saved by the news of the death of Tsar Boris Godunov.

The sudden death of the Tsar on 13 April 1605 removed the main barrier to further advances by Dimitry. Russian troops began to defect to his side, and, on 1 June, boyars in Moscow imprisoned the newly crowned tsar, Boris's son Feodor II, and the boy's mother, later brutally murdering them. On 20 June the impostor made his triumphal entry into Moscow, and on 21 July he was crowned Tsar by a new Patriarch of his own choosing, the Greek Cypriot Patriarch Ignatius, who as bishop of Ryazan had been the first church leader to recognize Dmitry as Tsar. The alliance with Poland was furthered by Dimitriy's marriage (per procura in Kraków) with the daughter of Jerzy Mniszech, Marina Mniszech, a Polish noblewoman with whom Dmitry had fallen in love while in Poland. The new Tsarina outraged many Russians by refusing to convert from Catholicism to the Russian Orthodox faith. Commonwealth king Sigismund was a prominent guest at this wedding. Marina soon left to join her husband in Moscow, where she was crowned a Tsarina in May.

While Dmitry's rule itself was nondescript and devoid of significant blunders, his position was weak. Many boyars felt they could gain more influence, even the throne, for themselves, and many were still wary of Polish cultural influence, especially in view of Dmitriy's court being increasingly dominated by the aliens he brought with himself from Poland. The Golden Freedoms, declaring all nobility equal, that were supported by lesser nobility, threatened the most powerful of the boyars. Thus the boyars, headed by Prince Vasily Shuyski, began to plot against Dmitry and his pro-Polish faction, accusing him of homosexuality, spreading Roman Catholicism and Polish customs, and selling Russia to Jesuits and the Pope. They gained popular support, especially as Dmitry was visibly supported by a few hundred irregular Commonwealth forces, which still garrisoned Moscow, and often engaged in various criminal acts, angering the local population.

On the morning of 17 May 1606, about two weeks after the marriage, conspirators stormed the Kremlin. Dmitry tried to flee through a window but broke his leg in the fall. One of the plotters shot him dead on the spot. At first, the body was put on display, but it was later cremated; the ashes were reportedly shot from a cannon toward Poland. Dmitriy's reign had lasted a mere ten months. Vasili Shuyski took his place as Tsar. About five hundred of Dmitriy's Commonwealth supporters were killed, imprisoned, or forced to leave Russia.

=== Second Polish invasion (1607–1609) ===
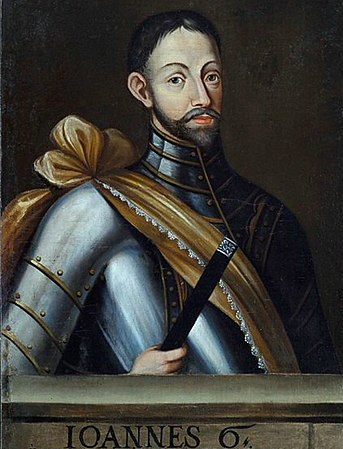
Jan Piotr Sapieha, Polish commander of troops stationing in Moscow. Sapieha was known for his ruthlessness towards the Russian people and was nicknamed Pan Hetman, meaning "Mr General".

Tsar Vasili Shuyski was unpopular and weak in Russia and his reign was far from stable. He was perceived as anti-Polish; he had led the coup against the first False Dmitry, killing over 500 Polish soldiers in Moscow and imprisoning a Polish envoy. The civil war raged on, as in 1607 the False Dmitry II appeared, again supported by some Polish magnates and 'recognized' by Marina Mniszech as her first husband. This brought him the support of the magnates of the Polish–Lithuanian Commonwealth who had supported False Dmitry I before. Adam Wiśniowiecki, Roman Różyński, Jan Piotr Sapieha decided to support the second pretender as well, supplying him with some early funds and about 7,500 soldiers. The pillaging of his army, especially of the Lisowczycy mercenaries led by Aleksander Lisowski, contributed to the placard in Sergiyev Posad: "three plagues: typhus, Tatars and Poles". In 1608 together with Aleksander Kleczkowski, Lisowczycy, leading a few hundred Don Cossacks working for the Commonwealth, ragtag szlachta and mercenaries, defeated the army of tsar Vasili Shuyski led by Zakhary Lyapunov and Ivan Khovansky at the Battle of Zaraysk and captured Mikhailov and Kolomna. Then Lisowczycy advanced towards Moscow but was defeated by Vasiliy Buturlin at the Battle of Medvezhiy Brod, losing most of his plunder. When Polish commander Jan Piotr Sapieha failed to win the siege of Troitse-Sergiyeva Lavra, Lisowczycy retreated to the vicinity of Rakhmantsevo. Soon, however, came successes (pillages) at Kostroma, Soligalich, and some other cities.

Dmitry speedily captured Karachev, Bryansk, and other towns. He was reinforced by the Poles, and in the spring of 1608 advanced upon Moscow, routing the army of Tsar Vasily Shuyski at Bolkhov. Dmitry's promises of the wholesale confiscation of the estates of the boyars drew many common people to his side. The village of Tushino, about twelve kilometers from the capital, was converted into an armed camp, where Dmitry gathered his army. His forces initially included 7,000 Polish soldiers, 10,000 Cossacks, and 10,000 other soldiers, including former members of the failed rokosz of Zebrzydowski, but his force grew gradually in power, and soon exceeded 100,000 men. He raised another illustrious captive, Feodor Romanov, to the rank of Patriarch, enthroning him as Patriarch Filaret, and won the allegiance of the cities of Yaroslavl, Kostroma, Vologda, Kashin, and several others. However, his fortunes were soon to reverse, as the Commonwealth decided to take a more active stance in the Russian civil wars.

== War (1609–1618) ==
=== Polish victories (1609–1610) ===
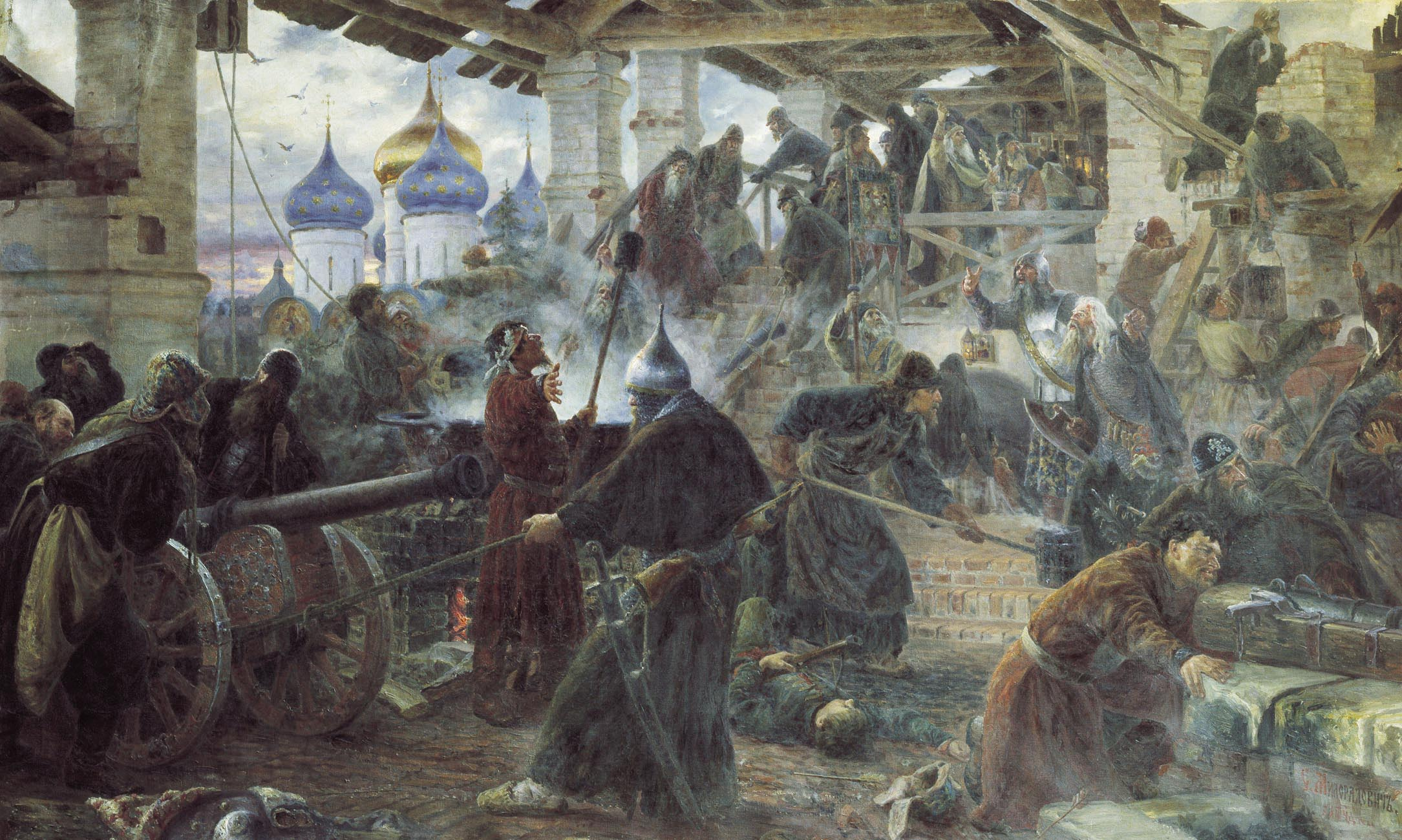
The defence of the Troitse-Sergiyeva Lavra by Orthodox monks led by the chronicler Avraamy Palitsyn (September 1609 to January 1611). Painting by Sergey Miloradovich.

In 1609 the Zebrzydowski Rebellion ended when Tsar Vasili signed a military alliance with Charles IX of Sweden (on 28 February 1609). The Commonwealth king Sigismund III, whose primary goal was to regain the Swedish throne, got permission from the Polish Sejm (Parliament) to declare war on Russia. He viewed it as an excellent opportunity to expand the Commonwealth's territory and sphere of influence, with hopes that the eventual outcome of the war would Catholicize Orthodox Russia (in this he was strongly supported by the Pope) and enable him to defeat Sweden. This plan also allowed him to give a purpose to the numerous restless former supporters of Zebrzydowski, luring them with promises of wealth and fame awaiting members of the campaign beyond the Commonwealth's eastern border. A book published that year by the well-travelled Polish Silesian nobleman, courtier and political activist Paweł Palczowski of Palczowic, Kolęda moskiewska (The Muscovite Carol), compared Russia to the Indian empires of the New World, full of golden cities and easy to conquer. The treatise was written to promote Polish colonialism and persuade delegates of the Sejm in January 1609 to support Sigismund III's expedition to Muscovy. Palczowski himself participated in and perished during Sigismund's Muscovy expedition. Some Russian boyars assured Sigismund of their support by offering the throne to his son, Prince Władysław. Previously, Sigismund had been unwilling to commit the majority of Polish forces or his time to the internal conflict in Russia, but in 1609 those factors made him re-evaluate and drastically change his policy.

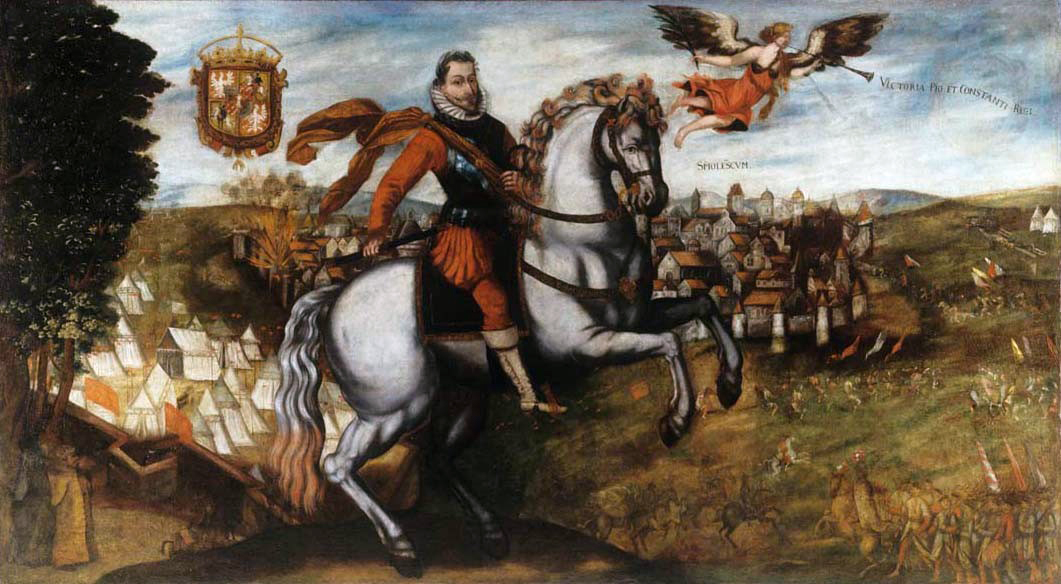
Victorious Sigismund III of Poland at Smolensk, by Italian-born artist Tommaso Dolabella

Although many Polish nobles and soldiers were fighting for the second False Dmitry at the time, Sigismund III and the troops under his command did not support Dimitriy for the throne – Sigismund wanted Russia himself. The entry of Sigismund into Russia caused the majority of the Polish supporters of False Dmitry II to desert him and contributed to his defeat. A series of subsequent disasters induced False Dmitry II to flee his camp disguised as a peasant and to go to Kostroma together with Marina. Dmitry made another unsuccessful attack on Moscow, and, supported by the Don Cossacks, recovered a hold over all of south-eastern Russia. He was killed, however, while half drunk, on 11 December 1610 by a Qasim Tatar princeling Pyotr Urusov, whom Dimitriy had flogged on a previous occasion.

A Commonwealth army under the command of Hetman Stanisław Żółkiewski, who was generally opposed to this conflict but could not disobey the king's orders, crossed the border and on 29 September 1609 laid siege to Smolensk, an important city Russia had recaptured from Lithuania in 1514. Smolensk was manned by fewer than 1,000 Russian men commanded by the voivod Mikhail Shein, while Żółkiewski commanded 12,000 troops. However, Smolensk had one major advantage: the previous Tsar, Boris Godunov, had sponsored the fortification of the city with a massive fortress completed in 1602. The Poles found it impenetrable; they settled into a long siege, firing artillery into the city, attempting to tunnel under the moat, and building earthen ramparts, remnants of which can still be seen today. The siege lasted 20 months before the Poles with the help of a Russian defector named Andrei Dedishin eventually succeeded in taking the fortress.

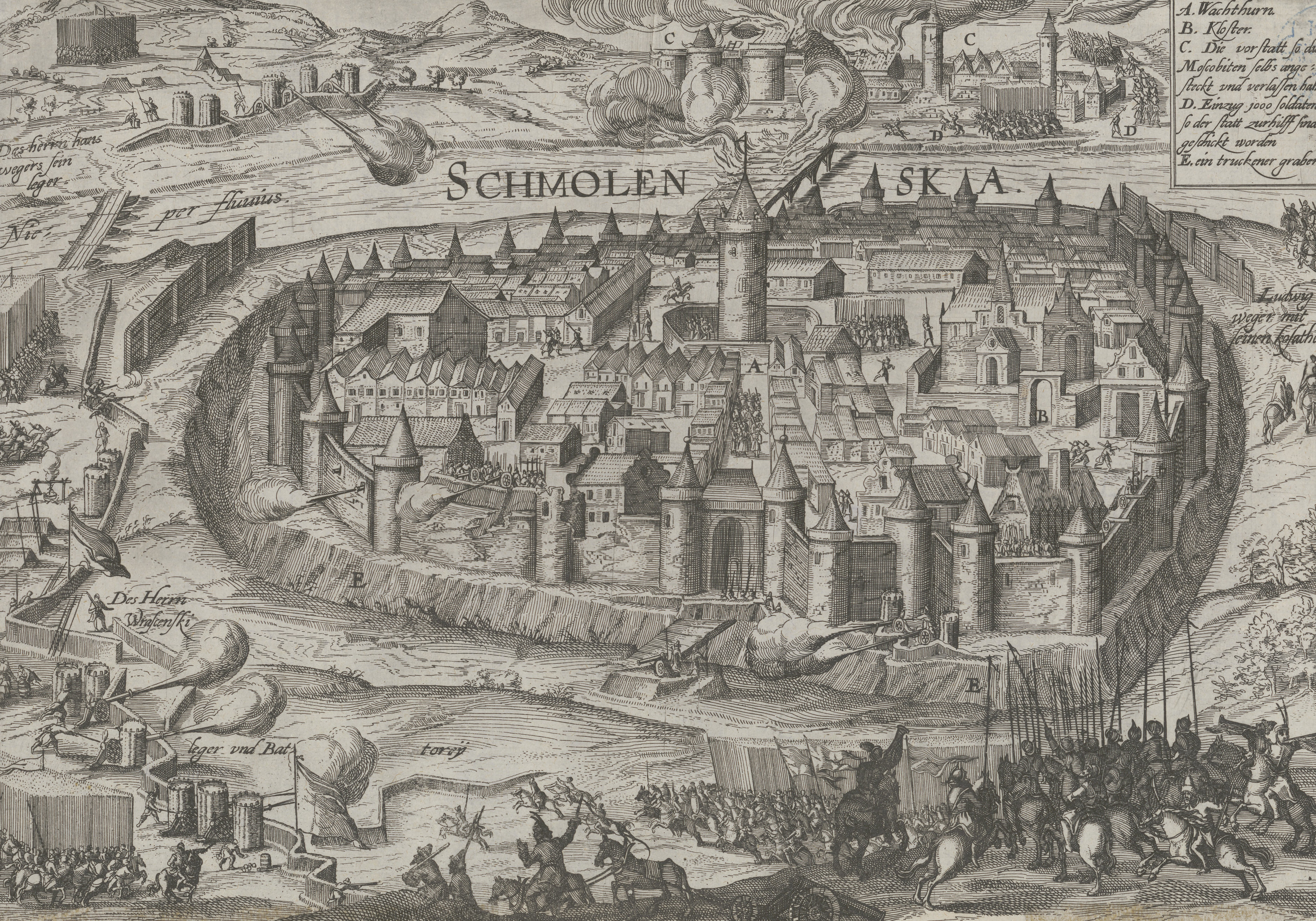
Siege of Smolensk (1609–1611) by the Polish army, by an anonymous author, possibly a witness of the siege

Not all of the Commonwealth attacks were successful. An early attack, led by Hetman Jan Karol Chodkiewicz with 2,000 men, ended in defeat when the unpaid Commonwealth army mutinied and compelled their leader to retreat through the heart of Russia and back to Smolensk. Not until Crown Prince Władysław, arrived with tardy reinforcements did the war assume a different character. In the meantime, Lisowczycy took and plundered Pskov in 1610 and clashed with the Swedes operating in Russia during the Ingrian War.

Several different visions of the campaign and political goals clashed in the Polish camp. Some of the former members of the Zebrzydowski Rebellion, opponents of Sigismund, actually advanced proposals to have Sigismund dethroned and Dmitriy, or even Shuyski, elected king. Żółkiewski, who from the beginning opposed the invasion of Russia, came into conflict with Sigismund over the scope, methods, and goal of the campaign. Żółkiewski represented the traditional views of Polish nobility, the szlachta, which did not support waging aggressive and dangerous wars against a strong enemy like Russia. Thus Żółkiewski favored the plans for peaceful and voluntary union, much like that with Lithuania. Żółkiewski offered Russian boyars rights and religious freedom, envisioning an association resulting in the creation of the Polish–Lithuanian–Muscovite Commonwealth. To that end, he felt that Moscow's cooperation should be gained via diplomacy, not force. Sigismund III, however, did not want to engage in political deals and compromises, especially when these had to include concessions to the Orthodox Church. Sigismund was a vocal, almost fanatical, supporter of the Catholic Church and Counter-Reformation, and believed that he could win everything and take Moscow by force, and then establish his own rule along with the rule of Roman Catholicism.

=== Poles in Moscow (1610) ===
On 31 January 1610 Sigismund received a delegation of boyars opposed to Shuyski, who asked Władysław to become the tsar. On 24 February Sigismund sent them a letter in which he agreed to do so, but only when Moscow was at peace.

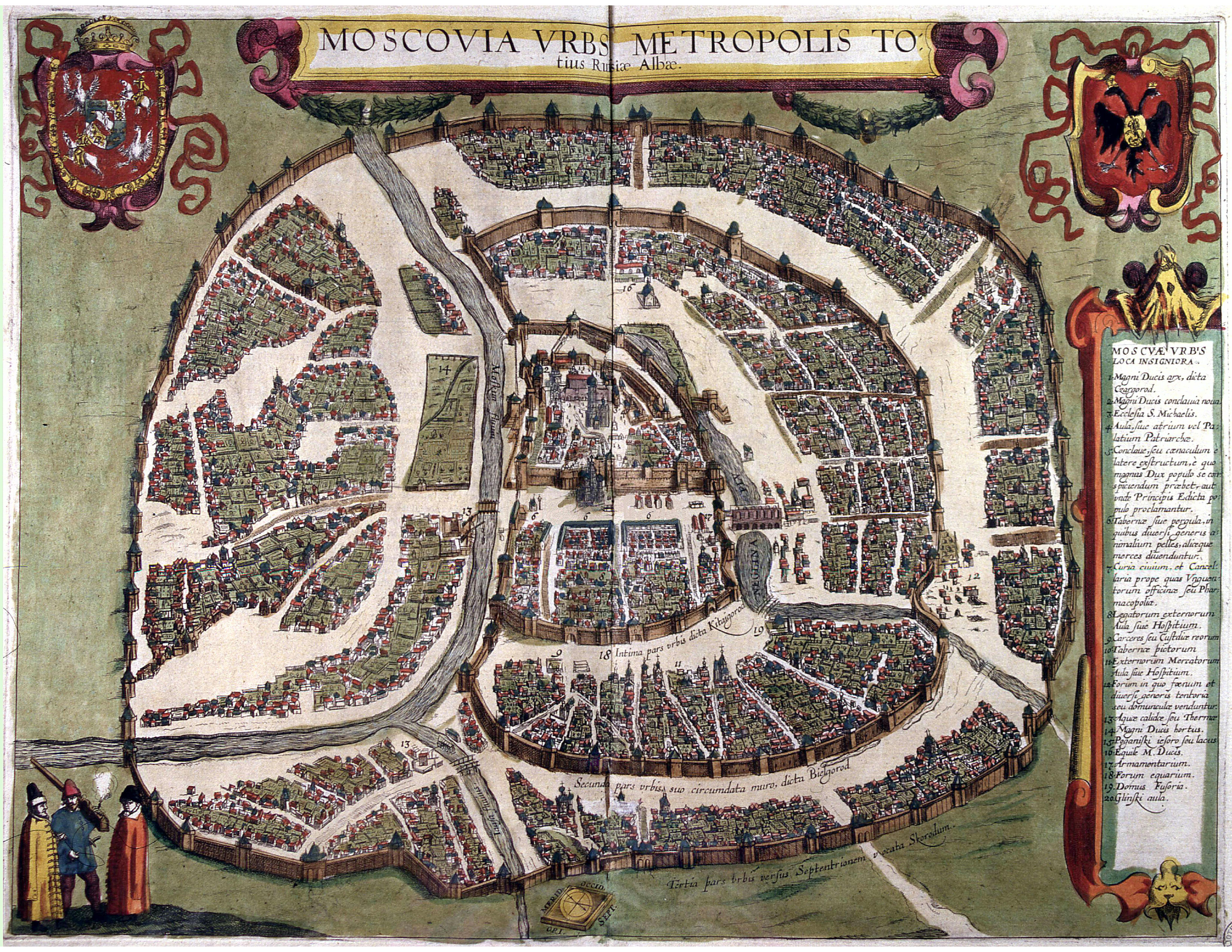
The so-called "Sigismundian" map illustrating Moscow in 1610, commissioned by Sigismund III of Poland

Hetman Żółkiewski, whose only other choice was mutiny, decided to follow the king's orders and left Smolensk in 1610, leaving only a smaller force necessary to continue the siege. With Cossack reinforcements, he marched on Moscow. However, as he feared and predicted, as the Polish–Lithuanian forces pressed eastwards, ravaging Russian lands, and as Sigismund's lack of willingness to compromise became more and more apparent, many supporters of the Poles and of the second False Dmitry left the pro-Polish camp and turned to Shuyski's anti-Polish faction.

Russian forces under Grigory Voluyev were coming to relieve Smolensk and fortified the fort at Tsaryovo-Zaymishche (Carowo, Cariewo, Tsarovo–Zajmiszcze) to bar the Poles' advance on Moscow. The Siege of Tsaryovo began on 24 June. However, the Russians were not prepared for a long siege and had little food and water inside the fort. Voluyev sent word for Dmitry Shuyski (Tsar Shuyski's brother) to come to their aid and lift the siege. Shuyski's troops marched for Tsaryovo, not by the direct route, but round-about through Klushino, hoping to come to Tsaryovo by the back route. Shuyski received aid from Swedish forces under the command of Jacob Pontusson De la Gardie.

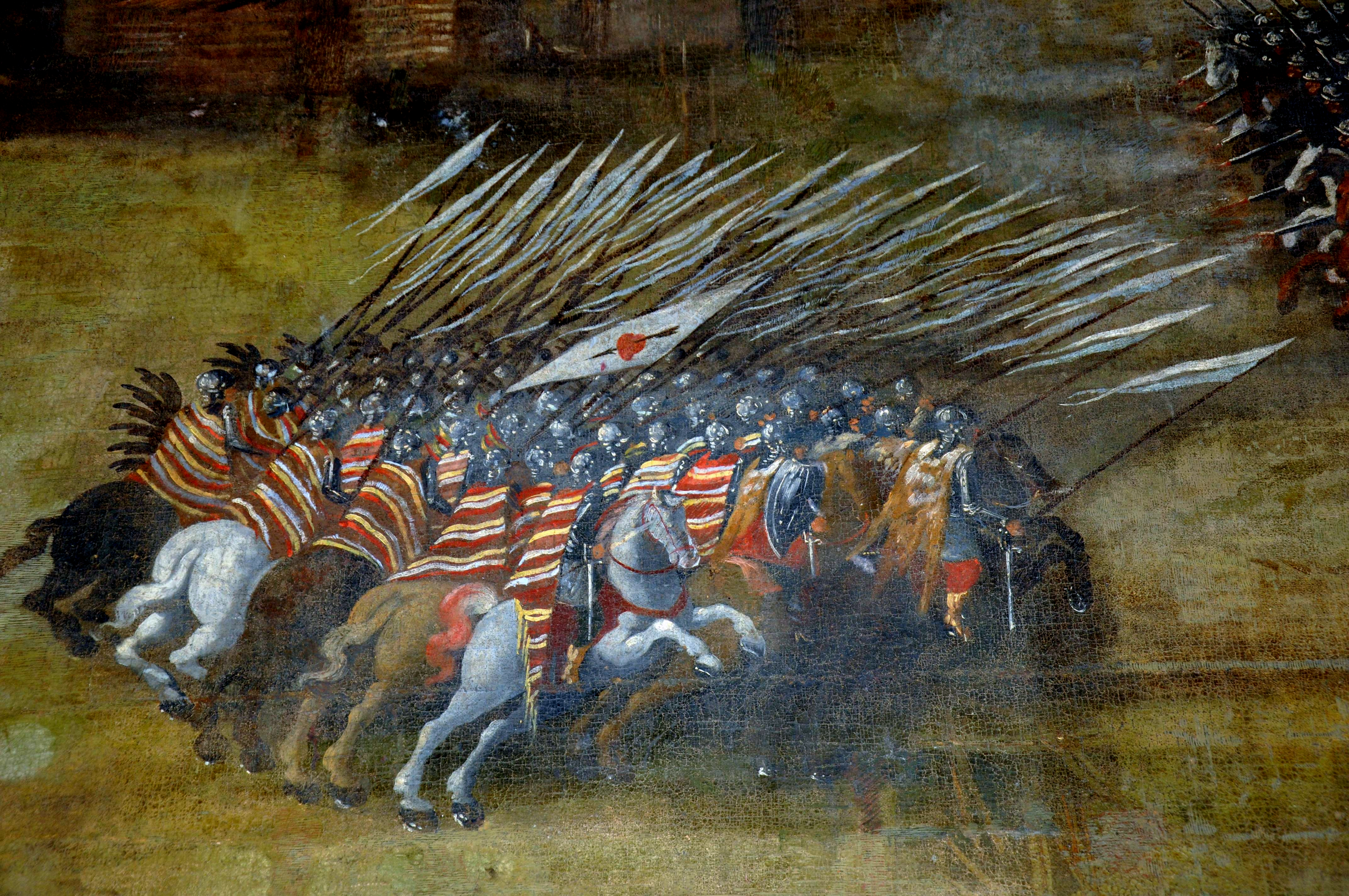
Polish Hussar formation at the Battle of Klushino.

Żółkiewski learned of Shuyski's relief force and divided his troops to meet the Russians before they could come to Tsaryovo and lift the siege. He left at night so that Voluyev would not notice his absence. The combined Russian and Swedish armies were defeated on 4 July 1610 at the battle of Klushino (Kłuszyn), where 7,000 Polish elite cavalry, the winged hussars, led by the hetman himself, defeated the numerically superior Russian army of about 35,000–40,000 soldiers. This giant and surprising defeat of the Russians shocked everyone and opened a new phase in the conflict.

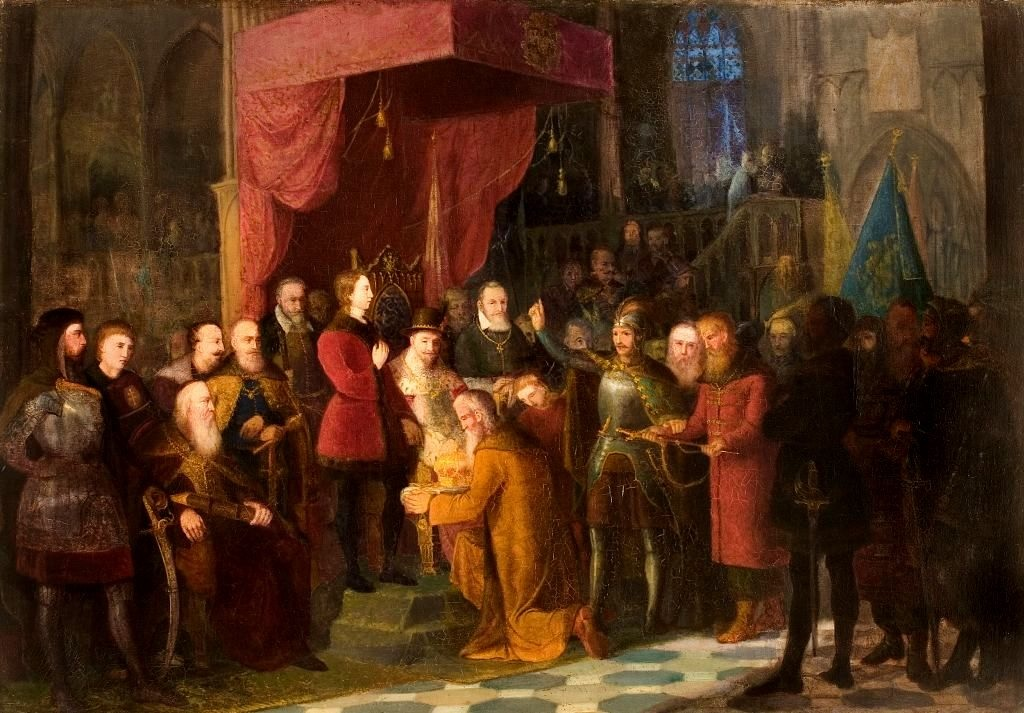
Shuyski Tsar brought by Żółkiewski to the Sejm in Warsaw before Sigismund III, by Jan Matejko

After the news of Klushino spread, support for Tsar Shuyski almost completely evaporated. Żółkiewski soon convinced the Russian units at Tsaryovo, which were much stronger than the ones at Kłuszyn, to capitulate and to swear an oath of loyalty to Władysław. Then he incorporated them into his army and moved towards Moscow. In August 1610 many Russian boyars accepted that Sigismund III was victorious and that Władysław would become the next tsar if he converted to Eastern Orthodoxy. The Russian Duma voted for Tsar Shuyski to be removed from the throne. Shuyski's family, including the tsar, were captured, and Shuyski was reportedly taken to a monastery, forcibly shaved as a monk, and compelled to remain at the monastery under guard. He was later sent to Warsaw, as a kind of war trophy, and eventually died in Gostynin.

Shortly after Shuyski was removed, both Żółkiewski and the second False Dmitri arrived at Moscow with their separate armies. It was a tense moment, filled with the confusion of the conflict. Various pro- and anti-Polish, Swedish, and domestic boyar factions vied for temporary control of the situation. The Russian army and the people themselves were unsure if this was an invasion and that they should close and defend the city, or if it was a liberating force that should be allowed in and welcomed as allies. After a few skirmishes, the pro-Polish faction gained dominance, and the Poles were allowed into Moscow on 8 October. The boyars opened Moscow's gates to the Polish troops and asked Żółkiewski to protect them from anarchy. The Moscow Kremlin was then garrisoned by Polish troops commanded by Aleksander Gosiewski. On 27 July a treaty was signed between the boyars and Żółkiewski promising the Russian boyars the same vast privileges the Polish Szlachta had, in exchange for them recognizing Władysław as the new tsar. However, Żółkiewski did not know that Sigismund, who remained at Smolensk, already had other plans.

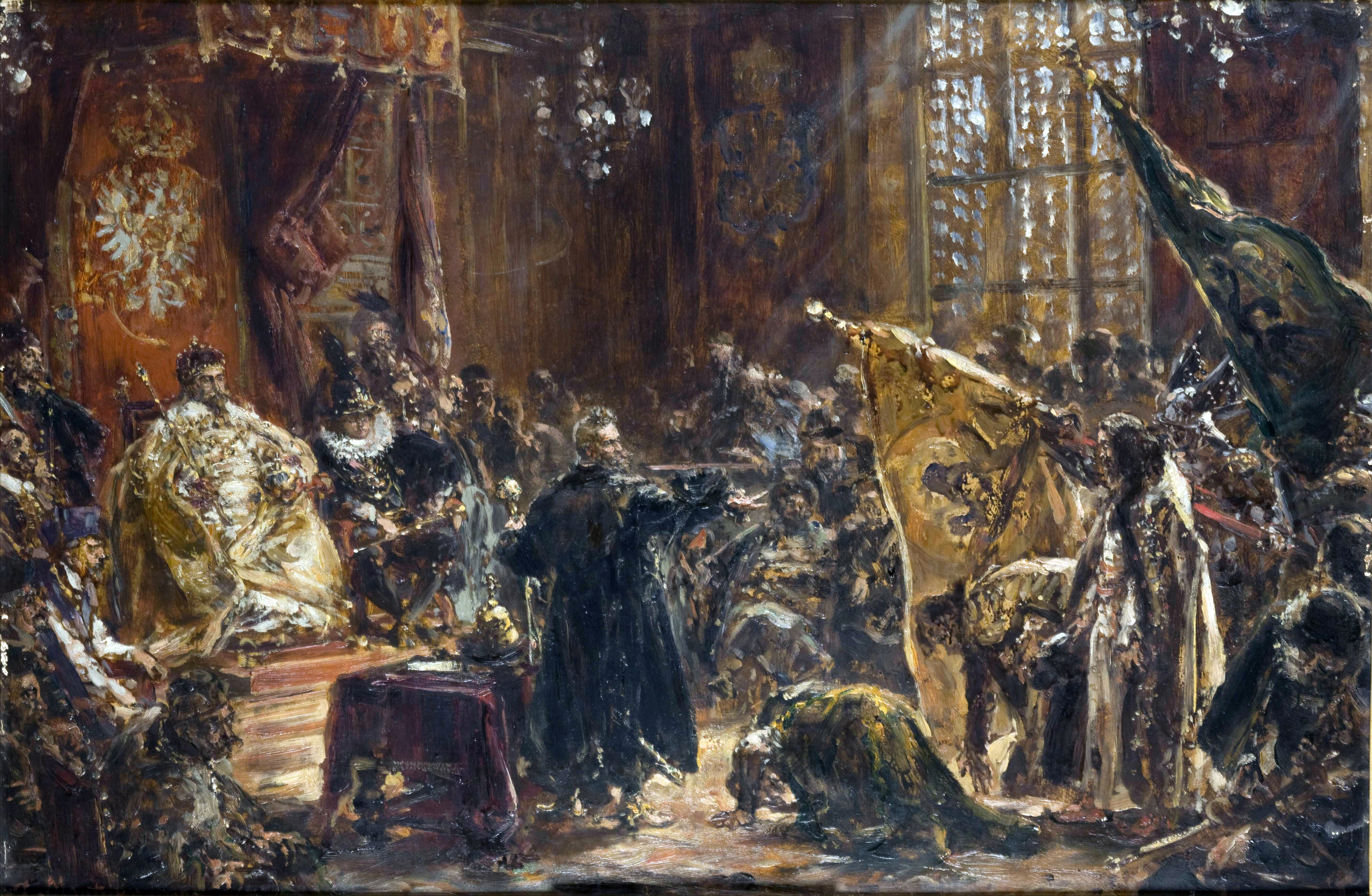
Shuyski Tsar at the Sejm in Warsaw, by Jan Matejko, oil on canvas

In the meantime, Żółkiewski and the second False Dmitriy, formerly reluctant allies, began to part ways. The second False Dmitry had lost much of his influence over the Polish court, and Żółkiewski would eventually try to drive Dmitry from the capital. Żółkiewski soon began manoeuvring for a tsar of Polish origin, particularly the 15-year-old Prince Władysław. The boyars had offered the throne to Władysław at least twice, in the hopes of having the liberal Polish–Lithuanian Commonwealth end the despotic rule of their current tsars. Through Żółkiewski's work, the pro-Polish factions among the boyars (composed of knyazes Fyodor Mstislavsky, Vasily Golitsyn, Fyodor Sheremetev, Daniil Mezetsky and diaks Vasily Telepnyov, and Tomiło Łagowski) gained dominance and once again a majority of the boyars said that they would support Władysław for the throne, if he converted to Orthodoxy and if the Polish–Lithuanian Commonwealth returned the fortresses that they had captured in the war.

However, Sigismund, supported by some of the more devout and zealous nobility, was completely opposed to the conversion of the prince. From that point the planned Polish–Lithuanian–Muscovite union began to fall apart. Offended and angered by Sigismund, the boyars dragged their feet on supporting Władysław. They were divided between electing Vasily Galitzine, Michael Romanov (also 15 years old), or the second False Dmitriy. Żółkiewski acted quickly, making promises without the consent of the still-absent king, and the boyars elected Władysław as the new tsar. Żółkiewski had the most prominent of the opponents, Fyodor Romanov, Michael's father and the patriarch of Moscow, exiled from Russia to secure Polish support. After the election of Władysław, the second False Dmitry fled from Tushino, a city near Moscow, to his base at Kaluga. However, his position was precarious even there, and he was killed on 20 December by one of his own men. Marina Mniszech, though, was pregnant with the new "heir" to the Russian throne, Ivan Dmitriyevich, and she would still be a factor in Russian politics until her eventual death in 1614.

Władysław faced further opposition from a seemingly unlikely party: his father. When Żółkiewski returned to meet Sigismund at Smolensk in November of that year, Sigismund III changed his mind and decided that he could gain the Russian throne for himself. A majority of the Russians opposed the move, especially as Sigismund didn't hide his intent to Catholicize and Polonize the Russian Tsardom. Żółkiewski found himself in an awkward position – he had promised the boyars Prince Władysław to keep the Russian throne for Poland, and he knew that they would not accept Sigismund III, who was unpopular throughout Russia. However, he also had to explain this to his king, who was convinced, from his conquests in the west, of his popularity in Russia. Eventually, Żółkiewski, disappointed with Sigismund, returned to Poland. Sigismund eventually compromised and decided that he would allow his son to take the throne and that he would rule as regent until Władysław came of age. Thus, he required that the boyars who submitted and swore allegiance to Prince Władysław would also have to swear an oath to him. The boyars were more resistant to this request and support for the Poles eroded fast. Władysław was never able to take real power, and the war soon resumed. Sigismund and Władysław left the city for safer ground as tensions grew, and the small Polish garrison at the Kremlin soon became isolated and subject to increased hostility, as more and more of the formerly pro-Polish boyars began to change factions. The Polish forces outside Moscow under the command of Jan Piotr Sapieha clashed with the growing anti-Polish Russian forces of the so-called First Volunteer Army, led by Prokopy Lyapunov.

In the meantime, the siege of Smolensk continued, even as Władysław was named tsar of Russia and cities and forts throughout the area swore allegiance to the Poles. However, Sigismund III required that Smolensk not only swear allegiance, but open its gates to the Poles, which the Russians refused to do. Żółkiewski fortified Moscow with his army and returned to King Sigismund III, who had remained at Smolensk while Żółkiewski negotiated in Moscow. The largest tunneling project at Smolensk came in December 1610; however, the Poles only managed to destroy more of the outer wall – the inner wall remained intact. The siege continued. At one point, the Polish guns breached the outer wall, and the governor of Braclaw (Bracław) ordered his soldiers to rush in; however, the Russians had predicted where the breach would occur and had fortified that part of the wall with additional men. Both sets of troops were slaughtered, and the Poles were eventually beaten back.

=== The war resumes (1611) ===
A 1611 uprising in Moscow against the Polish garrison marked the end of Russian tolerance for the Commonwealth intervention. The citizens of Moscow had voluntarily participated in the coup in 1606, killing 500 Polish soldiers. Now, ruled by the Poles, they once again revolted. The Moscow burghers took over the munition store, but Polish troops defeated the first wave of attackers, and the fighting resulted in a large fire that consumed part of Moscow. From July onward the situation of the Commonwealth forces became grave, as the uprising turned into a siege of the Polish-held Kremlin. Reportedly, the Poles had imprisoned the leader of the Orthodox Church, Patriarch Hermogenes. When the Russians attacked Moscow, the Poles ordered him, as the man with the most authority with the Russians at the time, to sign a statement to call off the attack. Hermogenes refused and was starved to death. The Polish Kremlin garrison then found itself besieged.

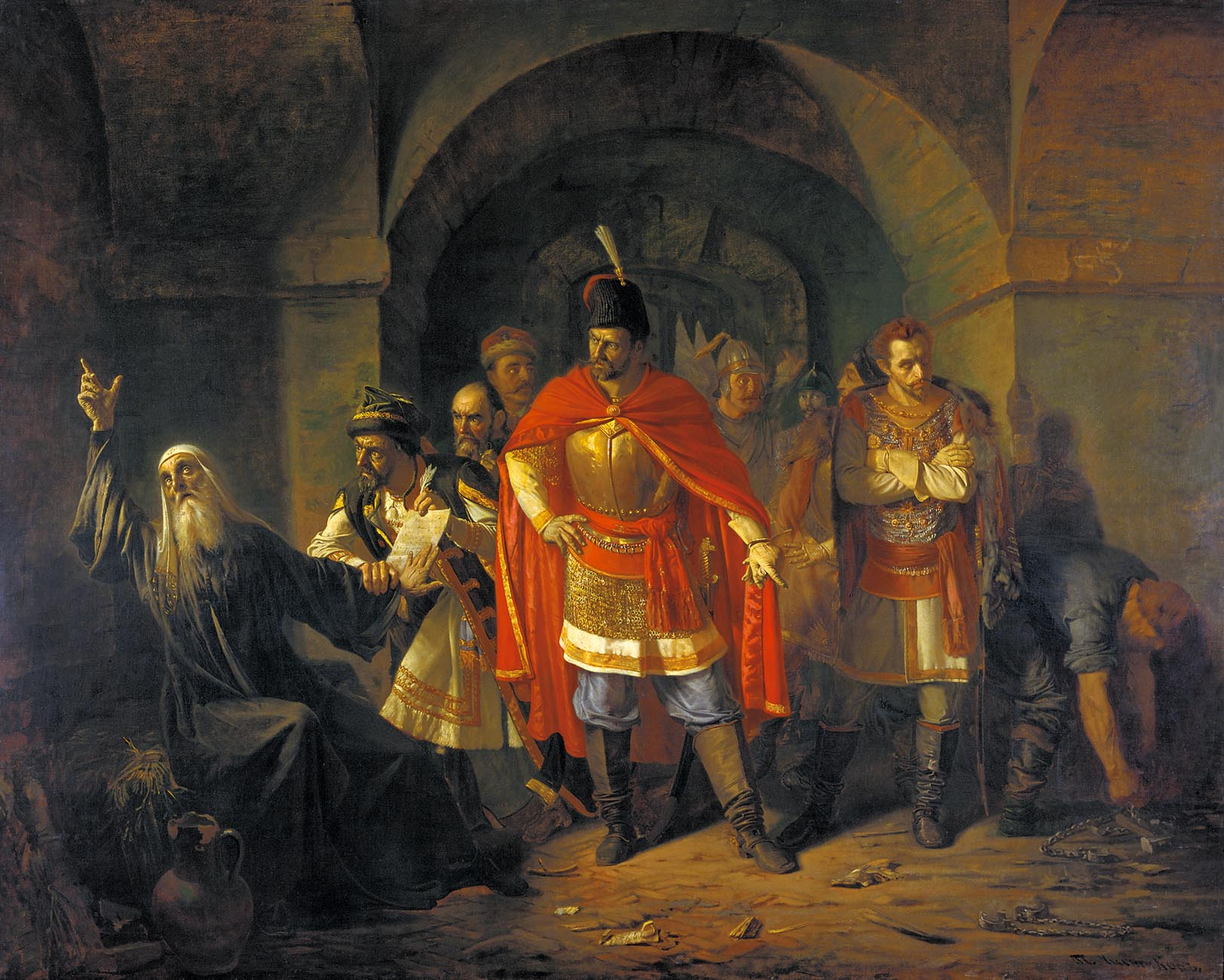
Patriarch Hermogenes refuses to sign a letter condemning anti-Polish actions, painting by Pavel Chistyakov

In the meantime, in late 1611, prince Dmitry Pozharsky was asked to lead the public opposition against the Poles, organized by the merchants' guild of Nizhny Novgorod. The respected town butcher (literally, a meat-trader) Kuzma Minin oversaw the handling of funds donated by the merchants to form the Second Volunteer Army (Russian: Второе народное ополчение). When part of the Polish army mutinied in January 1612 due to unpaid wages and retreated from Russia towards the Commonwealth, the forces of the Second Volunteer Army strengthened the other anti-Polish Russian forces in Moscow. The 9,000-strong Polish army under hetman Jan Karol Chodkiewicz attempted to lift the siege and clashed with Russian forces, attempting to break through to Polish forces in the Kremlin on 1 September. The Polish forces used cavalry attacks in the open field, exercising tactics that were new to them: escorting a mobile tabor fortress through the city. After early Polish successes, the Russian Cossack reinforcements had forced Chodkiewicz's forces to retreat from Moscow.

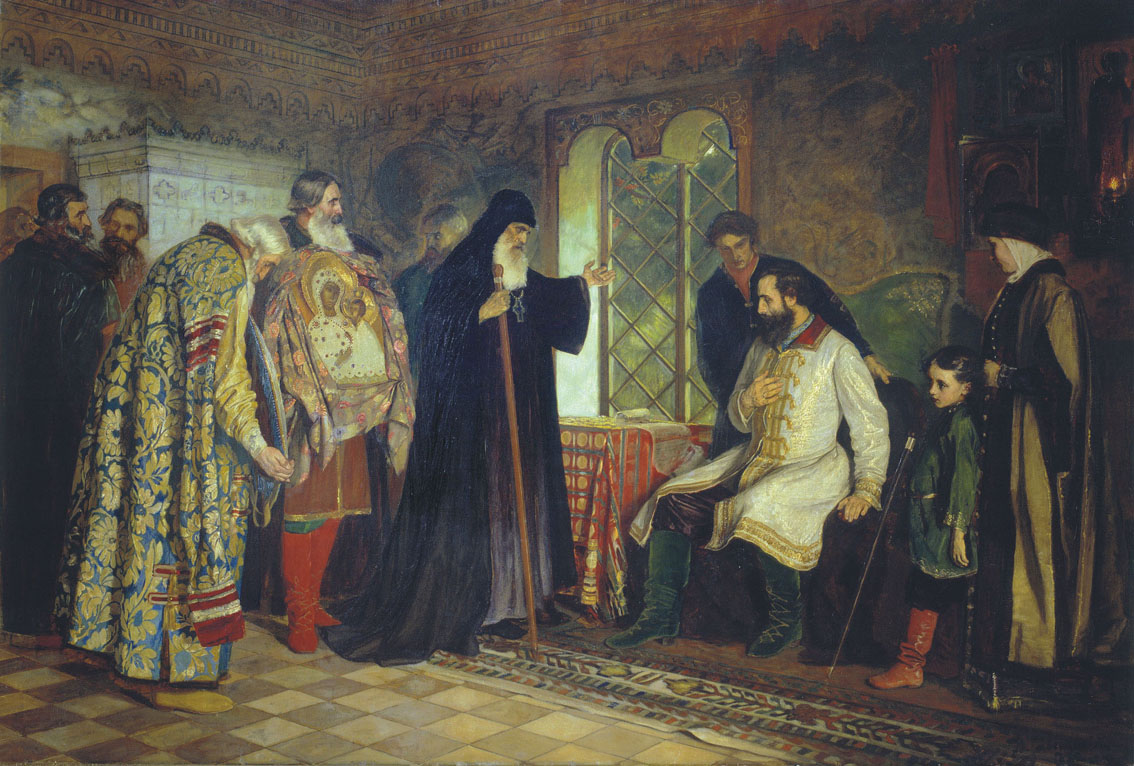
Dmitry Pozharsky is asked to lead the volunteer army against the Poles, painting by Vasily Savinsky (1882)

Russian reinforcements under Prince Pozharsky eventually starved the Commonwealth garrison (there were reports of cannibalism) and forced its surrender on 1 November (though some sources give 6 November or 7 November) after the 19-month siege. A historian (Parker) writes vividly of the Polish soldiers: "First they ate grass and offal, then they ate each other, and the survivors finally surrendered. The Moscow Kremlin fell on 6 November 1612." On 7 November, the Polish soldiers withdrew from Moscow. Although the Commonwealth negotiated a safe passage, the Russian forces massacred half of the former Kremlin garrison forces as they left the fortress. Thus, the Russian army recaptured Moscow.

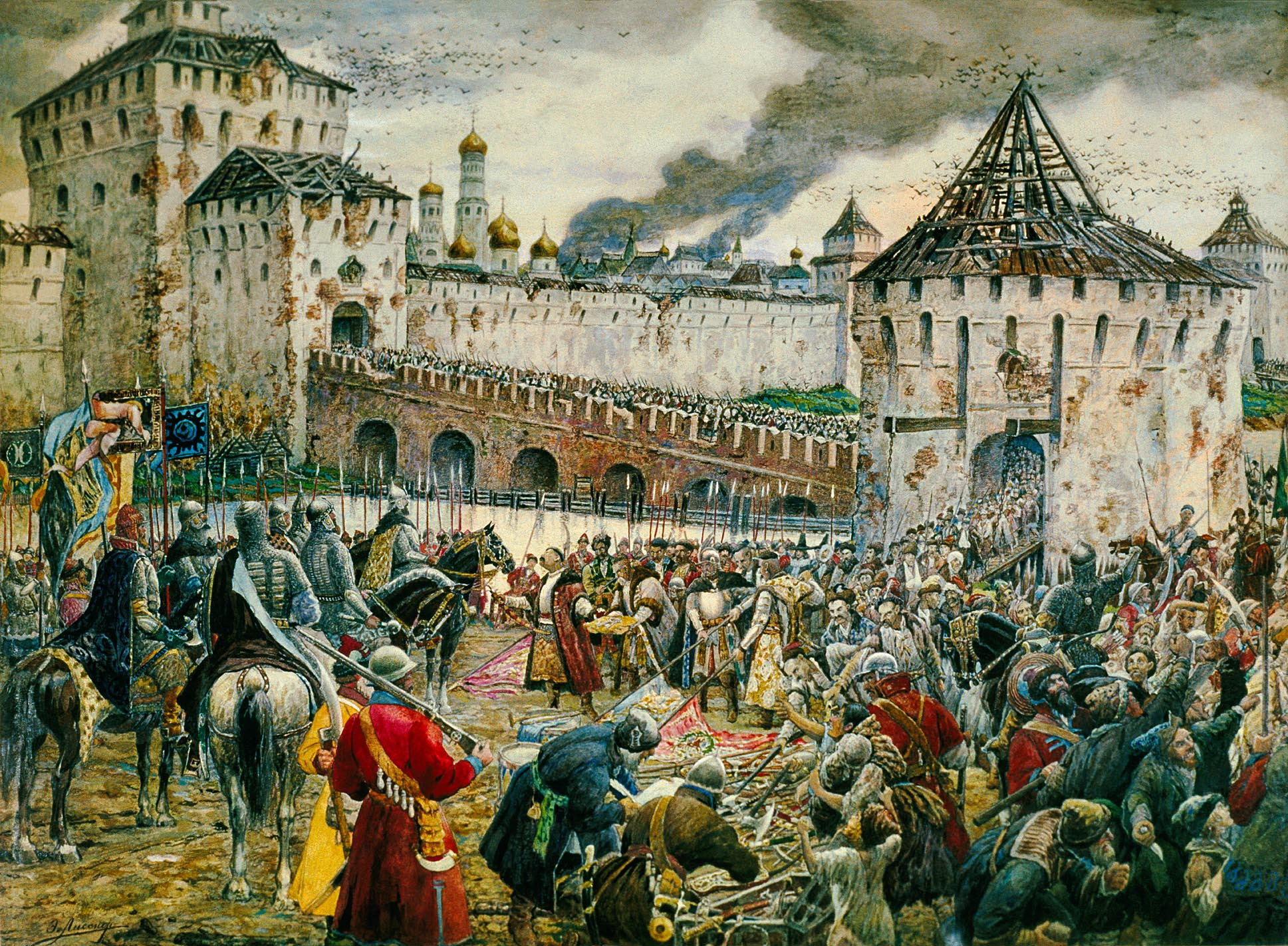
The Poles surrender the Moscow Kremlin to Prince Pozharsky in 1612, painting by Ernst Lissner

On 2 June 1611 Smolensk had finally fallen to the Poles. After enduring 20 months of siege, two harsh winters and dwindling food supplies, the Russians in Smolensk finally reached their limit as the Polish–Lithuanian troops broke through the city gates. The Polish army, advised by the runaway traitor Andrei Dedishin, discovered a weakness in the fortress defenses, and on 13 June 1611 Cavalier of Malta Bartłomiej Nowodworski inserted a mine into a sewer canal. The explosion created a large breach in the fortress walls. The fortress fell on the same day. The remaining 3,000 Russian defenders took refuge in the Assumption Cathedral and blew themselves up with stores of gunpowder to avoid death at the hands of the invaders. Although it was a blow to lose Smolensk, the defeat freed up Russian troops to fight the Commonwealth in Moscow, and the Russian commander at Smolensk, Mikhail Borisovich Shein, was considered a hero for holding out as long as he had. He was captured at Smolensk and remained a prisoner of Poland–Lithuania for the next nine years.

=== A new respite (1612–1617) ===
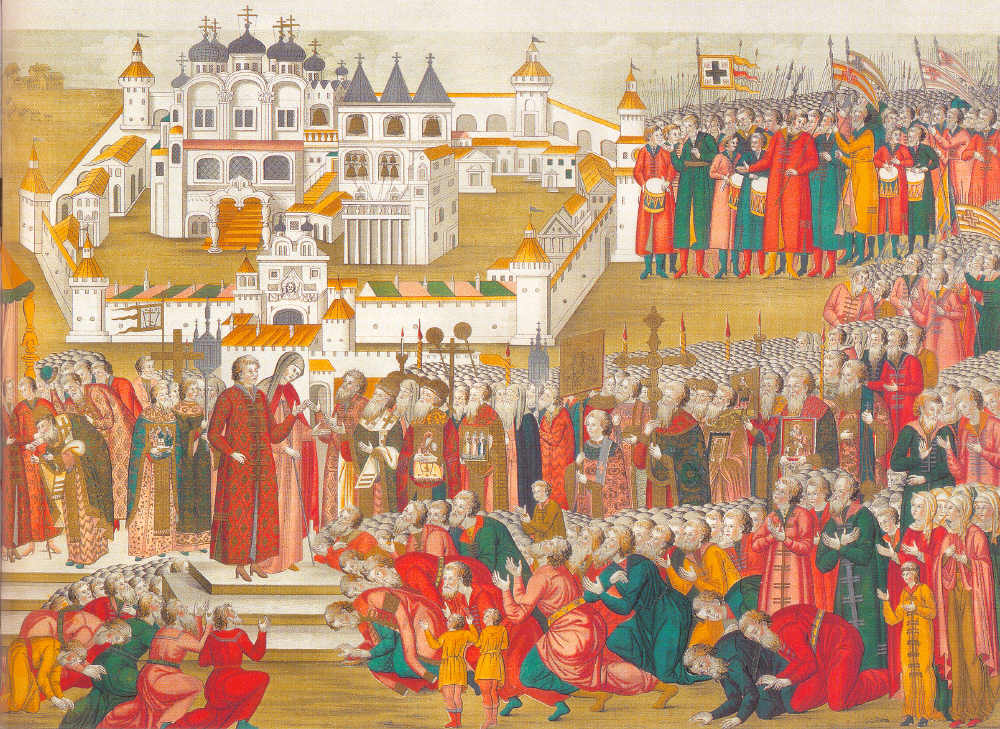
Mikhail Romanov finding out about his election to the Russian throne in the Ipatiev Monastery. Source: 17th century illustrated manuscript.

After the fall of Smolensk, the Russo-Polish border remained relatively quiet for the next few years. However, no official treaty was signed. Sigismund, criticized by the Sejm (the Polish parliament made up of the szlachta, who were always reluctant to levy taxes upon themselves to pay for any military force) for his failure to keep Moscow, received little funding for the army. This led to a mutiny of the Polish regular army (wojsko kwarciane), or rather to the specific semi-legal form of mutiny practiced in the Commonwealth: a konfederacja (confederation). The resulting konfederacja rohaczewska was considered the largest and most vicious of the soldiers' confederations in the history of the Commonwealth, and it pillaged Commonwealth territories from 1612 until the most rebellious of the konfederacjas were defeated on 17 May 1614 at the Battle of Rohatyn, whereupon the rest received their wages. The leader of the confederation, Jan Karwacki, was captured and sent in chains by the future hetman Stanisław Koniecpolski to his mentor, hetman Żółkiewski, and later executed in Lwów. The Ottoman Empire further criticized Sigismund because the Cossacks in Ukraine once again had begun to make unsanctioned raids into Turkish territory. Thus, Poland–Lithuania got no support from the Ottoman Empire in its war.

In the meantime, the Russian Time of Troubles was far from over, and Russia had no strength to take advantage of the Commonwealth's weakness. On 21 February 1613 the Zemsky Sobor ("Assembly") named Michael Romanov, the now 16-year-old son of Fyodor Romanov, the new tsar.

Fyodor, now installed as Patriarch Filaret, was a popular boyar and patriarch of Moscow, one of several boyars who vied to gain control of the Russian throne during the Time of Troubles. The Romanovs were a powerful boyar family; Michael's great-aunt (the sister of his grandfather) was Anastasia Romanovna, the wife of Ivan the Terrible. However, the new tsar had many opponents. Marina Mniszech tried until her death in 1614 to install her child as Tsar of Russia; various boyar factions still vied for power, trying to unseat the young Tsar Michael; and Sweden intervened in force, trying to gain the throne for Duke Carl Philip, even succeeding for a few months. However, Philip received even less support than Władysław, and the Swedes were soon forced to retreat from Russia.

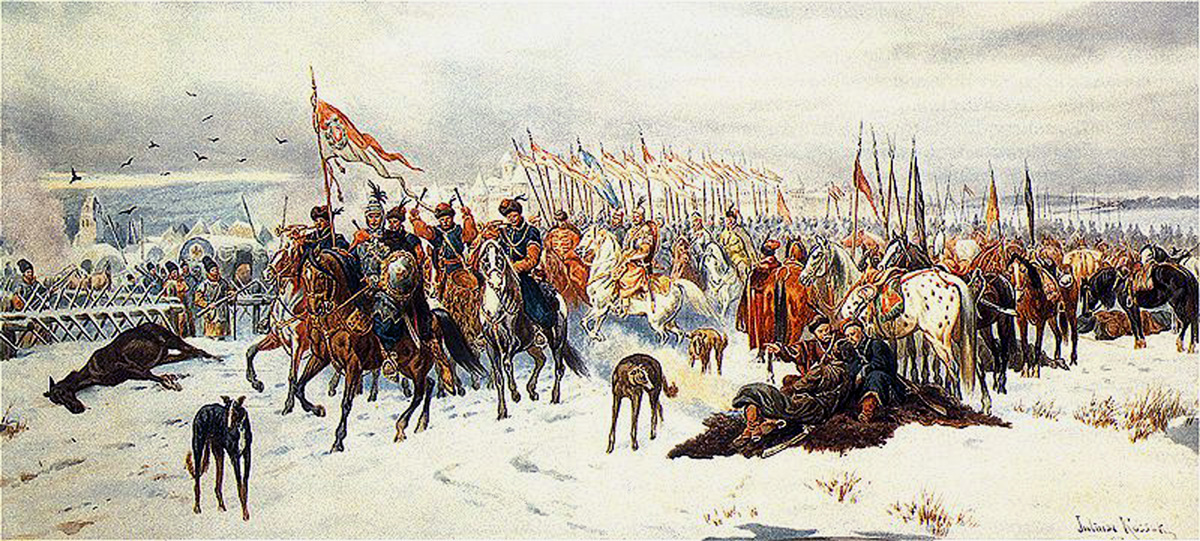
Conquest of Smolensk by Polish forces, by Juliusz Kossak.

While both countries were shaken by internal strife, many smaller factions thrived. Polish Lisowczycy mercenaries, who were essential in the defense of Smolensk in 1612, when most regulars (wojsko kwarciane) mutinied and joined the konfederacja rohatynska, were content to guard the Polish border against the Russian incursions for the next three years. However, in 1615 Aleksander Józef Lisowski gathered many outlaws and invaded Russia with 6 chorągiew of cavalry. He besieged Bryansk and defeated the relief force of a few thousand soldiers under Prince Yuri Shakhovskoy near Karachev. Then Lisowski defeated the front guard of a force several times larger than his own, under the command of knyaz Dmitry Pozharsky, who decided to defend instead of attack and fortified his forces in a camp. Lisowczycy broke contact with his forces, burned Belyov and Likhvin, took Peremyshl, turned north, defeated the Russian army at Rzhev, proceeded north towards Kashin, burned Torzhok, and returned to Poland heavy with loot without any further opposition from Russian forces. Lisowski and his forces remained at the Russo–Polish border until autumn 1616, at which point Lisowski suddenly fell ill and died on 11 October. The formation was then known as Lisowczycy. Despite the death of Lisowski, his forces remained a significant threat: in 1616 they captured Kursk and defeated Russian forces at Bolkhov.

=== The final stage (1617–1618) ===
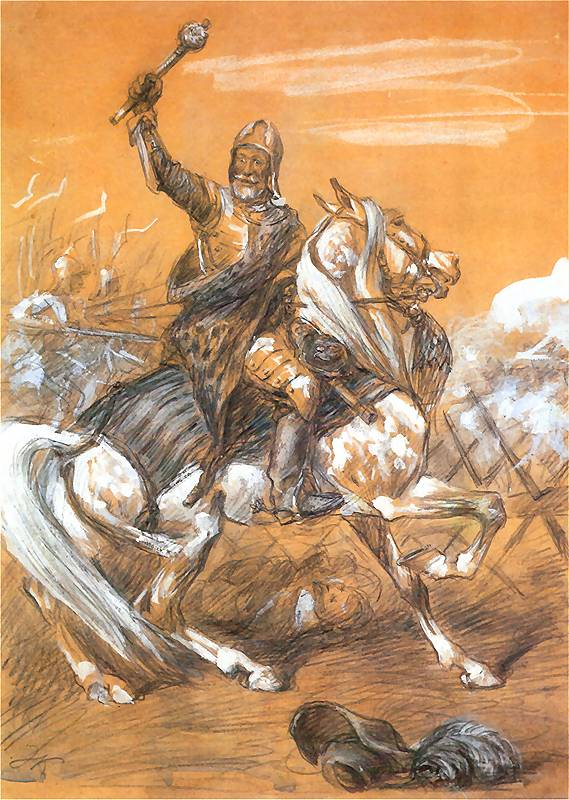
Jan Karol Chodkiewicz

Eventually the Commonwealth Sejm voted to raise the funds necessary to resume large scale military operations. The final attempt by Sigismund and Władysław to gain the throne was a new campaign launched on 6 April 1617. Władysław was the nominal commander, but it was hetman Chodkiewicz who had actual control over the army. In October, the towns of Dorogobuzh (Дорогобуж, Drohobuż, Drohobycz) and Vyazma (Вязьма, Wiaźma) surrendered quickly, recognizing Władysław as the tsar. However, the Commonwealth forces met stubborn resistance near Mozhaisk, and Chodkiewicz's plans for a quick advance to Moscow failed. Władysław did not have enough forces to advance to Moscow again, especially because the Russian support for the Poles was all but gone by that time.

In 1618, Petro Sahaidachny agreed to join the campaign against the Tsardom of Russia. His army of Zaporozhian Cossacks invaded from the South, captured and sacked a number of towns, such as Livny, Yelets, Dankov, etc. and headed for Moscow. The Russian army opposing the Poles retreated to Moscow and on 2 October Chodkiewicz and Sahaidachny together launched a siege of the Russian capital. However, their armies were not ready for a long siege and shortly after the night assault on 10–11 October failed, the siege was lifted. Negotiations began and a peace treaty was signed in December 1618.

== Aftermath ==
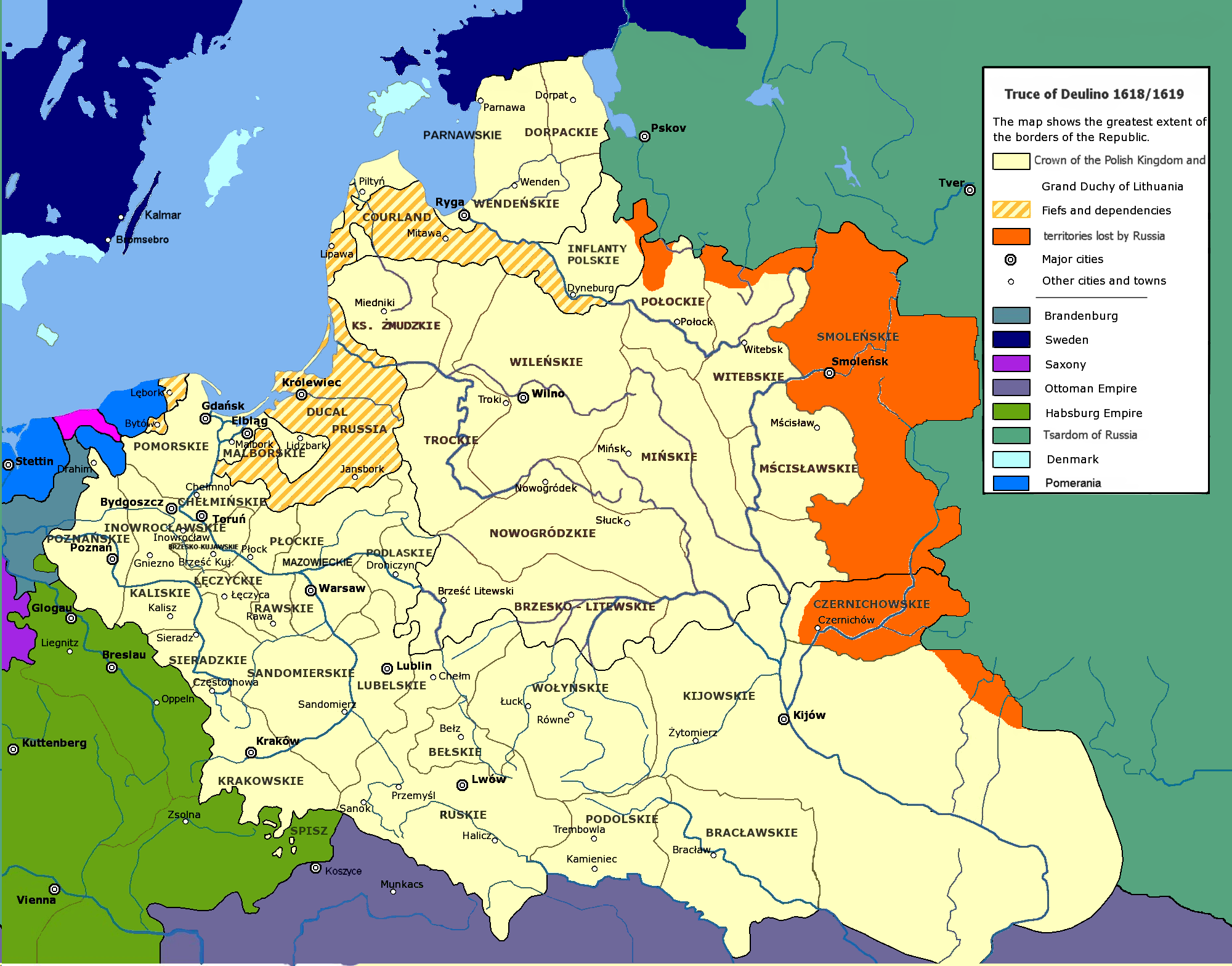
Territories gained by the Polish–Lithuanian Commonwealth marked in orange

In the end, Sigismund did not succeed in becoming tsar or in securing the throne for Władysław, but he was able to expand the Commonwealth's territory. During his reign Poland-Lithuania was the largest and most populous country in Europe. On 11 December 1618 the Truce of Deulino, which concluded the Dimitriad's war, gave the Commonwealth control over some of the conquered territories, including the territories of Chernigov and Severia (Siewiersk) and the city of Smolensk, and proclaimed a 15-year truce. Władysław refused to relinquish his claim to the Russian throne, even though Sigismund had already done so. While the Commonwealth gained some territories in the east, in terms of finance and lives it was a very costly victory.

In 1632 the Truce of Deulino expired, and hostilities immediately resumed in the course of a conflict known as the Smolensk War. This time the war was started by the Russians, who tried to exploit the suspected weakness of the Commonwealth after the unexpected death of Sigismund III. However, they failed to regain Smolensk. Mikhail Shein surrendered to Władysław IV on 1 March 1634, and the Russians accepted the Treaty of Polyanovka in May 1634. The Russians had to pay 20,000 rubles to the Commonwealth, but Władysław relinquished his claim to the Russian throne and recognized Michael as the legitimate tsar of Russia, also returning the Russian royal insignia.

== Modern legacy ==
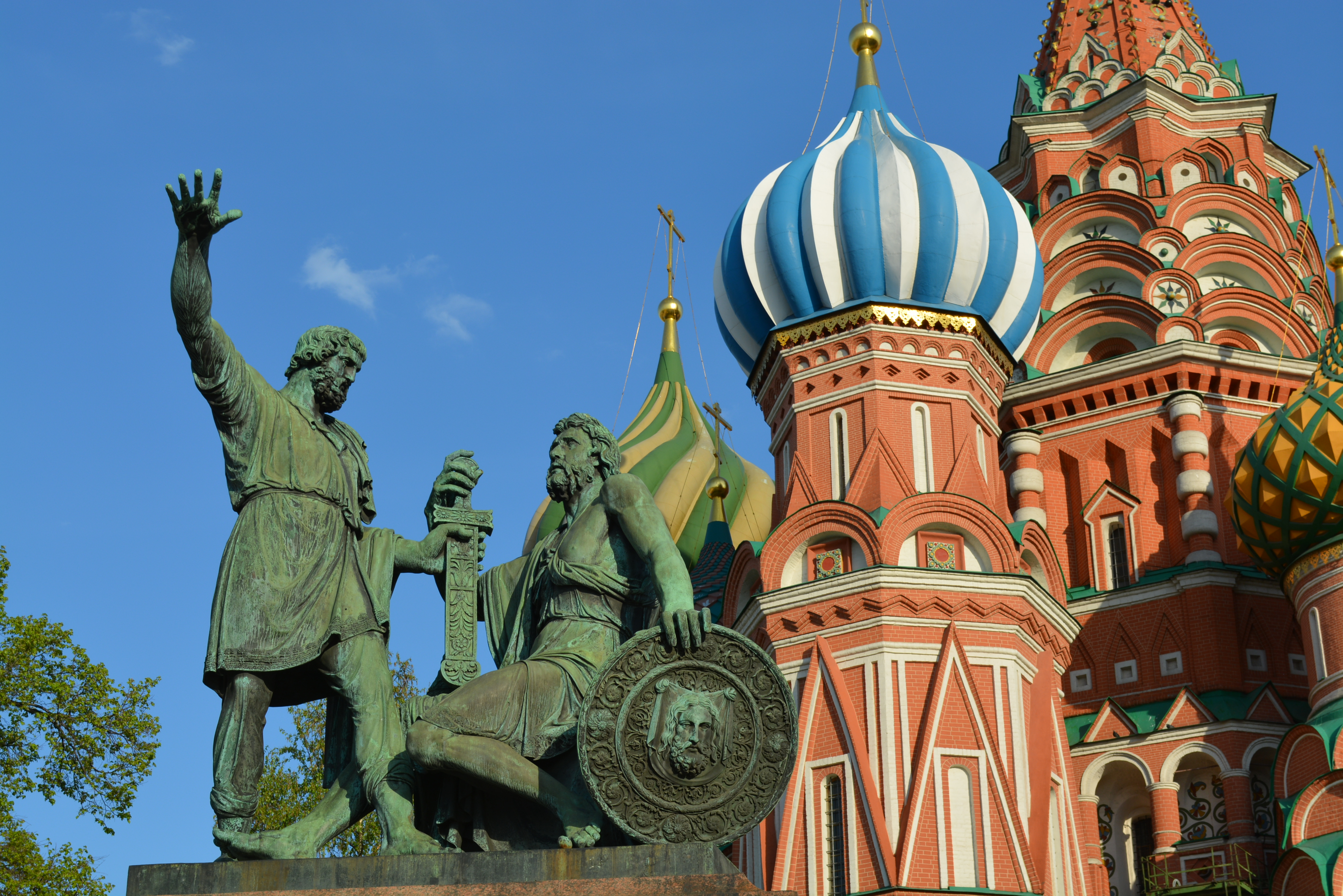
The Monument to Minin and Pozharsky stands before St. Basil's Cathedral in Moscow.

The story of the Dymitriads and False Dimitrys proved useful to future generations of rulers and politicians in Poland and Russia, and a distorted version of the real events gained much fame in Russia, as well as in Poland. In Poland the Dmitriads campaign is remembered as the height of the Polish Golden Age, the time Poles captured Moscow, something that even four million troops from Adolf Hitler's Nazi Germany and other Axis powers could not manage. In Russia it was useful to the new dynasty of tsars, the Romanovs, who understood that history is a powerful political tool, written by the victors. They tried to erase all references and theories to their role in creating the False Dmitrys, self-interested cooperation with Polish and Swedish interventions, or their opposition to the liberal unia troista; instead they supported a portrayal of Dmitriads as the heroic defense of Russian nation against the barbaric invasion of Polish–Jesuit alliance, which had attempted to destroy the Russian Orthodox culture. This was the history line shown by the famous Russian historian, Nikolai Mikhailovich Karamzin, beautifully described by Aleksandr Pushkin in his "Boris Godunov" and by Modest Mussorgsky in his opera Boris Godunov, and later romanticized in the film Minin and Pozharsky by Vsevolod Pudovkin. The Monument to Minin and Pozharsky was erected in Moscow's Red Square in 1818. The communist regime of the Soviet Union also found this war a useful propaganda tool, especially during the times of the Polish–Soviet War. The Dymitriads were also useful for the propaganda of Józef Piłsudski's Polish government between the World Wars.

In post-Soviet Russia the only autumn holiday, the National Unity Day, first celebrated on 4 November 2005, commemorates the popular uprising that ejected the occupying force from Moscow in November 1612, and more generally the end of the Time of Troubles and foreign interventions in Russia. Its name alludes to the idea that all the classes of the Russian society willingly united to preserve the Russian statehood when its demise seemed inevitable, even though there was neither Tsar nor Patriarch to guide them. President Vladimir Putin reestablished the holiday in 2004, replacing the commemoration of the October Revolution which formerly took place on 7 November, likely to reinforce a history of Russian nationalism over that of Communism (or revolution).

In modern Poland, from 2023, every 8 October, the Museum of the Eastern Lands of the Former Commonwealth in Lublin organizes the remembrance celebration about the allowing the Polish troops to take the Kremlin. The event holds a presentation of the arms from 17th century and a series of lectures about the Polish-Russian War.

== See also ==
- Moscow Uprising (1611)
- Prince Władysław's March on Moscow
- Livonian War (1577–1582)
- Moldavian Magnate Wars (1593–1621)
- Time of Troubles (1598–1615)
- Zebrzydowski rebellion (1606–1608)
- The De la Gardie Campaign (1609–1610)
  - Ingrian War (1610–1617)
- Treaty of Stolbovo (1617)
- Polish–Swedish wars (1600–1611, 1617–1629)
  - Smolensk War (1632–1634)
- Treaty of Polanów (1634)
- 1612, a Russian epic drama film released on 1 November 2007 about the expulsion of Polish troops from Moscow

== Sources ==
- Norman Davies, God's Playground, ISBN 0-231-05353-3 and ISBN 0-231-05351-7 (two volumes).
- Andrzej Nowak, Polacy na Kremlu, Tygodnik "Wprost", Nr 1182 (31 lipca 2005), (in Polish), accessed on 29 July 2005
- Paweł Jasienica, Rzeczpospolita Obojga Narodów, ISBN 83-06-01093-0.
- Jerzy Malec, Szkice z dziejów federalizmu i myśli federalistycznej w czasach nowożytnych, Wydawnictwo UJ, 1999, ISBN 83-233-1278-8
- Chester S. L. Dunning, Russia's First Civil War: The Time of Troubles and the Founding of the Romanov Dynasty, Pennsylvania State University Press, 2001, ISBN 0-271-02074-1 (parts available for free on Google Print)
