= Dobrun, Bryansky District, Bryansk Oblast =

Rural locality in Bryansky District, Bryansk Oblast, Russia

Coordinates: 53°11′4″N 34°14′8″E

Dobrun (Russian: Добру́нь) is a rural locality (a village) in Bryansky District of Bryansk Oblast, Russia, located 10 kilometers (6.2 mi) southwest of Bryansk. Population: 4,957 (2021 census); 4,482 (2010 census); 4,207 (2002 census).

== History ==
First documented information on Dobrunov relate to 1620, when the cadastres Bryansk district Dobrunov named possession of Prince Grigory Konstantinovich Volkonskogo.

In early 1664 the village, like many villages of the Bryansk neighborhood, desolate after the raid of the Crimean Tatars. By the beginning of the 18th century - possession Svensk monastery. In 1711, it was 19 yards in 1745 - 36 yards, in which there were 143 males.

In the 2nd half of the 19th century, the population began to grow Dobrunov faster allotment land was no longer enough to live at the expense of agriculture and development has been widely based hunting. Among the peasants increased social stratification. The first school opened in Dobrunov in 1895. In 1904 it had an enrollment of 50 children.
