= Goritsy =

Goritsy (Russian: Горицы) is the name of several rural localities in Russia:

- Goritsy, Pogarsky District, Bryansk Oblast, a village in Chausovsky Selsoviet of Pogarsky District of Bryansk Oblast
- Goritsy, Vygonichsky District, Bryansk Oblast, a village in Kokinsky Selsoviet of Vygonichsky District of Bryansk Oblast
- Goritsy, Zhiryatinsky District, Bryansk Oblast, a village in Goritsky Selsoviet of Zhiryatinsky District of Bryansk Oblast
- Goritsy, Ivanovo Oblast, a selo in Shuysky District of Ivanovo Oblast
- Goritsy, Kaluga Oblast, a village in Ulyanovsky District of Kaluga Oblast
- Goritsy, Kostroma Oblast, a village in Stolpinskoye Settlement of Kadyysky District of Kostroma Oblast
- Goritsy, Leningrad Oblast, a village in Bolshevrudskoye Settlement Municipal Formation of Volosovsky District of Leningrad Oblast
- Goritsy, Lipetsk Oblast, a selo in Korenevshchinsky Selsoviet of Dobrovsky District of Lipetsk Oblast
- Goritsy, Dmitrovsky District, Moscow Oblast, a village in Sinkovskoye Rural Settlement of Dmitrovsky District of Moscow Oblast
- Goritsy, Klinsky District, Moscow Oblast, a village in Petrovskoye Rural Settlement of Klinsky District of Moscow Oblast
- Goritsy, Nizhny Novgorod Oblast, a village in Bolsheokulovsky Selsoviet of Navashinsky District of Nizhny Novgorod Oblast
- Goritsy, Novgorod Oblast, a village in Gorskoye Settlement of Volotovsky District of Novgorod Oblast
- Goritsy, Ryazan Oblast, a selo in Mikhalsky Rural Okrug of Spassky District of Ryazan Oblast
- Goritsy, Andreapolsky District, Tver Oblast, a village in Andreapolsky District, Tver Oblast
- Goritsy, Kimrsky District, Tver Oblast, a selo in Kimrsky District, Tver Oblast
- Goritsy, Kuvshinovsky District, Tver Oblast, a village in Kuvshinovsky District, Tver Oblast
- Goritsy, Selizharovsky District, Tver Oblast, a village in Selizharovsky District, Tver Oblast
- Goritsy, Torzhoksky District, Tver Oblast, a village in Torzhoksky District, Tver Oblast
- Goritsy, Selivanovsky District, Vladimir Oblast, a village in Selivanovsky District, Vladimir Oblast
- Goritsy, Suzdalsky District, Vladimir Oblast, a selo in Suzdalsky District, Vladimir Oblast
- Goritsy, Gryazovetsky District, Vologda Oblast, a village in Sidorovsky Selsoviet of Gryazovetsky District of Vologda Oblast
- Goritsy, Kirillovsky District, Vologda Oblast, a selo in Goritsky Selsoviet of Kirillovsky District of Vologda Oblast
- Goritsy, Yaroslavl Oblast, a village in Zagoryevsky Rural Okrug of Pereslavsky District of Yaroslavl Oblast
