= Fyodor Basmanov =

16th-century Russian royal favorite

Fyodor Alexeyevich Basmanov (Russian: Фёдор Алексеевич Басмáнов, Russian pronunciation: [ˈfʲɵdər bɐˈsmanəf]) (fl. 1562–1570) was a Russian oprichnik, warlord and a favorite of Ivan the Terrible.

== Biography ==
The word "Basman" denoted a certain kind of bread made exclusively in the palace dwellings. This nickname was given to an individual named Daniil Pleshcheev, Basmanov's grandfather, who was a postelnichy of Vasily III, or a person who would make the bed of the ruler. The Basmanov family is recorded in the Velvet Book. Daniil Pleshcheev was taken prisoner in the Battle of Orsha in 1514 and died in Lithuania.

Fyodor Basmanov was the son of Alexei Basmanov, an important general and boyar who exerted great influence on Ivan the Terrible. Prince Kurbsky in his letters accuses the elder Basmanov of exploiting his son Fyodor to fall into the good graces of the Tsar. He also had a brother, Pyotr, who was executed in 1570 along with his father.

The first mention of him is made in 1562 in the razriady books, as a rynda. This may place his birth sometime in the late 1540s or the early 1550s. His status grew very quickly after 1562. He was sent by the Tsar on a certain task to the Tsar's aunt Yefrosinya Staritskaya in 1563, implying a high level of trust that the Tsar had in him.

In 1564, Alexei and Fyodor were active in Ryazan against the Tatars, and for their bravery, both were bestowed a golden medal by the Tsar.

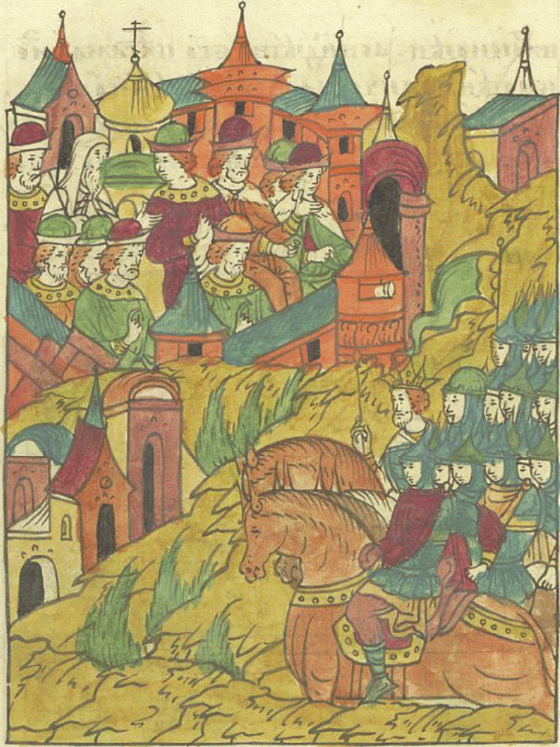
A depiction of Fyodor and Alexei Basmanov in Ryazan, from the Illustrated Chronicle of Ivan the Terrible

In 1567, the title kravchiy was bestowed onto Basmanov. This was a title giving Basmanov the responsibility to organize the tsar's feasts and sit next to the tsar in these feasts, which would have been a role close to the Tsar. The historian Nikolay Karamzin writes that the first favourites of Ivan the Terrible were Alexei and Fyodor, but that Fyodor was especially close to the Tsar, and especially cruel.

In 1568, the Tsar tasked the Basmanovs with the downfall of his enemy, Philip II, Metropolitan of Moscow. Philip was executed within a year. It was believed by his contemporaries that Basmanov the younger had an instrumental role in continuing the Livonian war.

Certain contemporaries of Basmanov, including Prince Kurbsky and Heinrich von Staden, made accusations against Fyodor of having a homosexual relationship with the Tsar. Allegedly, the prince Dmitry Ovchina accused Fyodor of being the Tsar's sodomite, and the furious Tsar had the accuser executed in 1563, possibly by strangulation. This account was written down by the author Alexander Guagnini. However, according to the historian Solovyov, Guagnini had never been in Moscow, putting the veracity of this account under doubt. Albert Schlichting, a foreigner who had also traveled in Muscovy, wrote that Basmanov could manipulate the Tsar to execute any of his enemies, and that this led to the death of Ovchina.

The circumstances of his death are unclear. Around the year 1570, he and his father fell out of favor with the Tsar, as the Tsar believed that they were working with Archbishop Pimen of Novgorod to surrender Pskov and Novgorod to his enemy, Sigismund II Augustus. However, his name is not documented anywhere in the document of executions that Ivan the Terrible kept, unlike his father and brother, whose executions in 1570 were recorded. Kurbsky wrote that Fyodor Basmanov killed his father on the orders of the Tsar. Historian George Vernadsky disputes the claim that Basmanov was executed; Vernadsky proposes that Basmanov the younger died anyway in 1570 or 1571. However, von Staden wrote that both Alexei and Fyodor were executed. Basmanov disappears from the historical record after 1571.

=== Marriages and family ===
It is documented that he married a member of the Sitsky noble family, Varvara Sitskaya, a niece of the late Tsaritsa Anastasia Romanovna. He had two children with her, Pyotr Basmanov and Ivan, and may have died in exile in Beloozero. Pyotr would go on to be a close confidant of Tsar Boris Godunov, and was killed in 1606; Ivan died in 1604 in battle.

== In popular culture ==
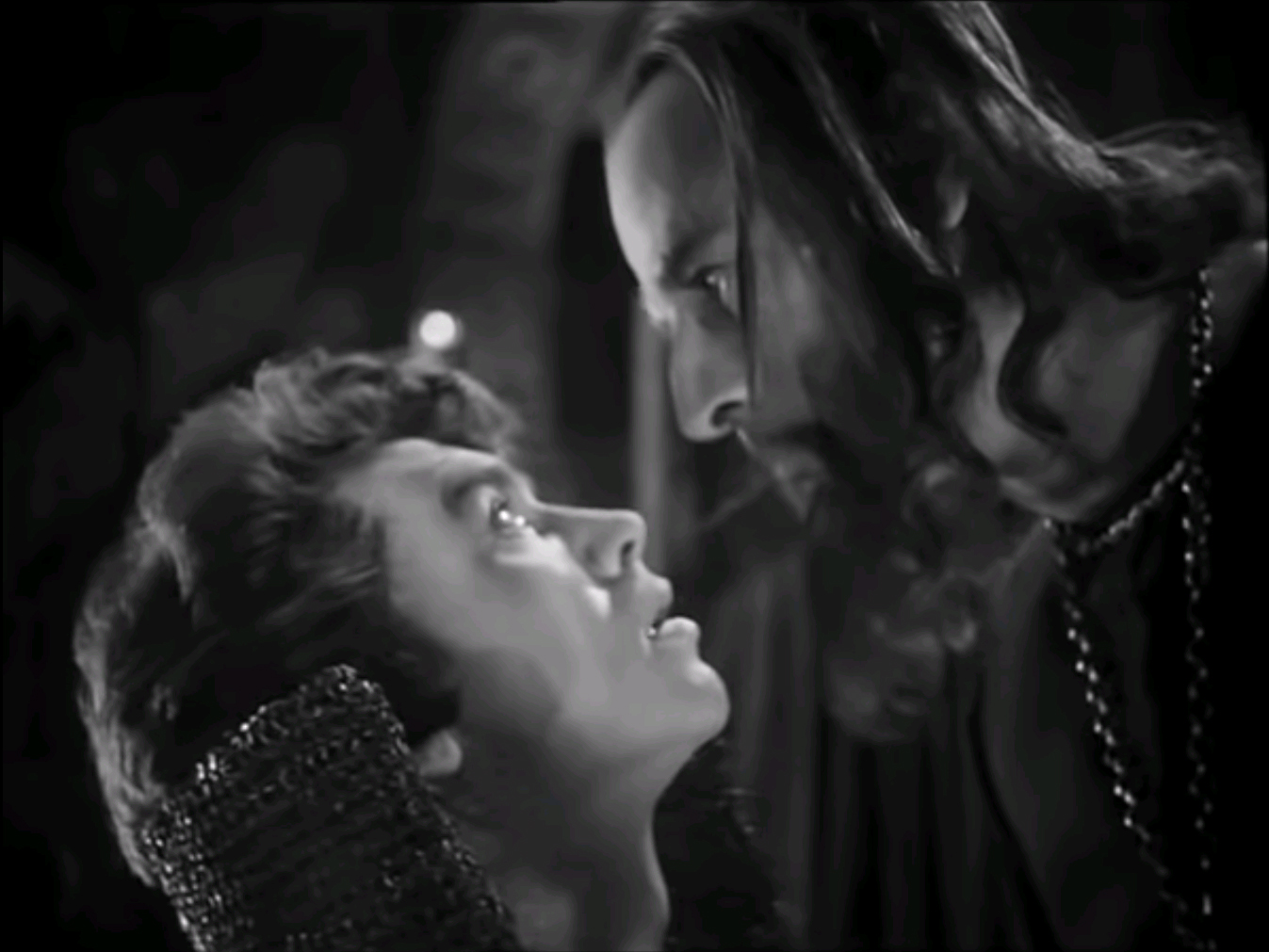
Mikhail Kuznetsov (left) as Fyodor Basmanov opposite Nikolay Cherkasov in Eisenstein's Ivan the Terrible

- He appears as a character in the 1926 silent film The Wings of a Serf where he is portrayed by Nikolai Prozorovsky.
- In Sergei Eisenstein's epic film Ivan the Terrible, Basmanov was portrayed by Mikhail Kuznetsov.
- He appears as a character in Alexey Konstantinovich Tolstoy's historical novel Prince Serebrenni, and also appears in both the 1991 Soviet film adaptation, where he was portrayed by Dmitry Pisarenko, and the 1992 adaptation: Thunder Over Rus (Russian: Гроза над Русью), where he was portrayed by Sergey Bezdushny. Although Basmanov is a side character in the novel, he has taken on new popularity in the age of the Internet, growing more popular than the main character Prince Serebrenni himself.
- He is portrayed by Alexander Ilyin in the 2008 historical film Tsar.
- He appears as a character in Ivan Lazhechnikov's play Oprichnik, and as a character in the Tchaikovsky opera The Oprichnik, inspired by the play.
- He appears as a character in Lidia Charskaya's tale "Wrath of the Tsar" (Russian: Царский гнев).
