= Joseph Spinel =

Russian painter, graphic artist, scenic designer

Joseph (Iossif) Spinel
- Born: 7 October 1892; Bila Tserkva, Ukraine
- Died: 2 July 1980 (aged 87); Moscow, Russia
- Children: Jelena Spinel (born 1930)

Iossif Aronovich Spinel (Russian: Иосиф Аронович Шпинель) (September 25 (7 October)1892, Bila Tserkva, Kiev Governorate, now Ukraine — 2 July 1980, Moscow) was a Russian painter, graphic artist and scenic designer of more than 60 films including Ivan the Terrible and Alexander Nevsky by Sergei Eisenstein.

Born as the eighth child in the poor Jewish family of a teacher in Belaya Tserkov (Ukrainian: Bila Tserkva, Ukraine), he survived several pogroms. First in Kiev, then in Moscow, he studied architecture. Then he continued his education in Vkhutemas (Higher Art and Technical Studios) with the great master of graphic design Vladimir Favorsky.

As a graphic artist he had illustrated several books in the 1920s, where modernist graphic design was used:

To illustrate Gastev’s ideas, Iosif Shpinel’ created a series of sketches in the suprematist and constructivist styles that accentuated this approach to the “education of the body as a working machine”.

Shpinel’s artistic education took place in one of the prominent centres of Soviet avant-garde art and architecture: from 1921 to 1926, he studied in the architecture department of the Higher Art and Technical Workshops in Moscow (VKhUTEMAS). Later he worked as a set designer with such prominent film directors as Aleksandr Dovzhenko (The Arsenal, 1929, and Ivan, 1932), Mikhail Romm (Boule de Suif, 1934), and Sergei Eisenstein (Alexander Nevskyi, 1938, and Ivan the Terrible, 1944–6).

His illustrations for Youth, Go! convey an image of the body reduced to a number of basic geometric shapes – circles, triangles, rectangles; a body devoid of symmetry and naturalness, and instead resembling a mannequin with limbs suspended on spherical joints and body parts freely detachable one from another. ... In Youth, Go!, the anatomy of the human hand is followed by the anatomy of an axe, insofar as both are part of a single whole: the new socialist working class.

Gastev iunost idi

As a major film artist and architect, he was renowned for his ingenuity:

A copy of the cathedral in Novgorod was built in the workshop of film architect Josef Spinel. The winter landscape with snow was captured on a few warm days in June, and the vast area was covered in chalk. Translation from Swedish:

The film director Grigori Roshal wrote in his memoirs:

... at our house, the artist Spinel, co-author of all my films since 1928, spoke, delighted and delighted, about his joint work with Eisenstein. He recalled the already completed "Alexander Nevsky" and rendered new sketches for "Ivan". Iosif Shpinel - a man of small stature and great soul, professor at the VGIK, teacher of hundreds of artists - was filled to overflowing with Eisenstein. (Translation from Russian)

He has taught since 1928, since 1940 at the Art Faculty of the All-Union State Institute of Cinematography VGIK, where he became a professor in 1965. His students became leading set designers at Soviet film studies.

The book about his life and work "Iossif Spinel: The Artist's Way" by Tamara Tarasova-Krasina was published by Iskusstvo Publishing House Moscow in 1979

As if the glow of a dark and stormy era lies on the whole atmosphere of Eisenstein's film "Ivan the Terrible" - on the heavy vaults and galleries of the palace, on the cathedral frescoes lit by the anxious flame of candles. Spinel's work in this film helps us to feel the time with all its contradictions, enhances the tragic tension of dramaturgical conflicts.(Translation from Russian)

== Awards and honors ==
- 1940 Honoured Artist of Russia
- 1951 Laureate of the State Prize
- 2008 The Film "Ivan the Terrible" got rank 39 on a list of the 100 best films selected by 78 French film critics and historians ref>Cahiers du Cinéma’s 100 Greatest Films (100 films pour une cinémathèque idéale). In: Internet Movie Database

== Filmography (selection) ==
- Arsenal (1929) Director: Alexander Dovzhenko
- Ivan (1932) Director: Alexander Dovzhenko
- Boule-de-Suif (after Maupassant) (1934) Director: Mikhail Romm
- The Petersburg Night (after Fedor Dostoevsky, 1934) Director: Grigori Roshal
- Dawn of Paris (1936) Director: Grigori Roshal
- The Oppenheim Family (after Lion Feuchtwanger, 1937) Director: Grigori Roshal
- Alexander Nevsky (1938) directed by Sergei Eisenstein & D. Vasilyev.
- A Lad from Our Town (1942) Alexander Stolper
- Mashenka (1942) Director: Yuly Raizman
- Ivan the Terrible (Part I -1944, Part II -1945/58, Part III-1947) Director: Sergei Eisenstein
- Tale of a True Man (1948) Alexander Stolper
- Conspiracy of the Doomed (1950) Director: Mikhail Kalatozov
- The Great Warrior of Albania Skanderbeg (1953) Director: Sergei Yutkevich
- The Road (1955) Director: Alexander Stolper
- Freemen ('Volnitsa' 1955) Director: Grigori Roshal
- Trilogy 'The Way Of Sorrow' ('Motion On The Torments'): The Sisters, The 18th Year, Gloomy Morning (1957–59) Director: Grigori Roshal
- Lifetime in a Year (1964) Director: Grigori Roshal
