= Goritsky Monastery =

Goritsky Monastery may refer to one of the following monasteries in Russia.

- Goritsky Monastery (Goritsy)
- Goritsky Monastery (Pereslavl-Zalessky)
