= Heinrich von Staden =

Heinrich von Staden may refer to:

- Heinrich von Staden (author) (1542–?), self-proclaimed "adventurer in Muscovy"
- Heinrich von Staden (historian) (born 1939), South African historian and classical scholar
