= Mashenka =

Mashenka or Maschenka may refer to:

- Mashenka or Mary (Nabokov novel)
- Maschenka (1987 film), British film based on the novel
- Mashenka (1942 film), Russian film unrelated to the novel
