= Ivan the Terrible (1945 film) =

Two-part film by Sergei Eisenstein released in 1945 and 1958

- Theatrical poster
- Directed by: Sergei Eisenstein
- Written by: Sergei Eisenstein
- Produced by: Sergei Eisenstein
- Starring: Nikolay Cherkasov; Lyudmila Tselikovskaya; Serafima Birman; Pavel Kadochnikov
- Cinematography: Andrei Moskvin; Eduard Tisse
- Edited by: Sergei Eisenstein; Esfir Tobak (assistant); Lev Indenbom (assistant)
- Music by: Sergei Prokofiev
- Production companies: Mosfilm; TsOKS
- Release dates: 16 January 1945 (Part I); 1 September 1958 (Part II)
- Running time: Part I: 95 minutes; Part II: 82 minutes
- Country: Soviet Union
- Language: Russian

Ivan the Terrible (Russian: Иван Грозный, romanized: Ivan Grozny) is a two-part Soviet historical drama film produced, written and directed by Sergei Eisenstein. The film chronicles the reign of 16th-century Russian Tsar Ivan IV (Nikolay Cherkasov) and details his formation of the oprichnina (Note: Oprichnina originally refers to the lands set aside for administration by Ivan, but it is also used to refer to the soldiers chosen to serve Ivan (the oprichniki) and the state policy of Ivan between 1565 and 1572.) and conflict with the boyars (nobility), particularly with his aunt (Serafima Birman) and cousin (Pavel Kadochnikov). Lyudmila Tselikovskaya plays Ivan's wife Anastasia Romanovna, and Mikhail Zharov, Amvrosy Buchma and Mikhail Kuznetsov play members of the oprichnina. The musical score was composed by Sergei Prokofiev.

The film was commissioned on behalf of Soviet leader Joseph Stalin in January 1941. In Russian historiography, Ivan had generally been portrayed negatively; the film was intended to depict the tsar in a positive light and to draw parallels between Ivan and Stalin. Production was delayed by the German invasion and the subsequent Soviet entry into World War II in June. Principal photography eventually commenced in April 1943; the film was shot partly in black and white and partly in color. Most of the production was shot in black and white in the city of Alma-Ata; the color scenes were filmed in Moscow. Eisenstein had planned to finish both parts of the film by 1944, but delays meant only Part I and partial principal photography of Part II was completed by 1944. Part I was released in 1945 and received a Stalin Prize. Part II was completed in 1946, but was poorly received by Soviet authorities for its negative depiction of Ivan and banned that year; it was not released until 1958. Eisenstein intended Ivan the Terrible to be a three-part film, and had begun filming for Part III, but abandoned it after the ban of Part II. He died in 1948, leaving the project incomplete.

Ivan the Terrible had a polarized reception, being both harshly criticized and highly praised within the Soviet Union as well as internationally. Its visuals and scope were praised, but other aspects such as the acting and plot had a more mixed reception. Over the decades, Ivan the Terrible has been re-evaluated as both one of Eisenstein's greatest works and one of the greatest films of the 20th century. It has also sparked debate for its treatment of Stalinism and depiction of Ivan as a Stalin-like figure, and has been the subject of academic study with regard to its portrayal of history, religion, gender, homoeroticism and power.

== Plot ==
Ivan the Terrible, Part I

=== Part I ===
In 1547, the 17-year-old grand prince of Moscow, Ivan IV, is crowned as the first tsar of all Russia, amid animosity from the boyars (nobility) and jealousy from his aunt, Yefrosinya Staritskaya, who wishes to see her son, Vladimir Staritsky, on the throne. (Note: Russian surnames and titles are often marked by gender, which is why Yefrosinya's and Vladimir's surnames differ slightly. A more detailed look at Russian surnames can be found at the article on East Slavic name grammar.) Ivan makes a speech proclaiming his intent to unite and protect Russia against the foreign armies outside her borders and the enemies within—a reference to the boyars, who are already unhappy with his coronation. A Livonian ambassador asks Prince Andrey Kurbsky, Ivan's close friend, why Ivan is more worthy to rule than he is.

Shortly after, Ivan marries Anastasia Romanovna. At the wedding, Kurbsky, who is in love with her, attempts to seduce her, but she rejects his advances. Fyodor Kolychov, another close friend of Ivan, informs him that he cannot support him in his mission against the boyars and receives his permission to retire to monastic life. The marriage feast is interrupted by an unruly mob of common people, led by Malyuta Skuratov and the holy fool Nikola. The two complain that the tsar is being manipulated and led astray by the tsarina's family. Ivan calms the crowd, but is interrupted by envoys from the khanate of Kazan, who announce that Kazan has declared war against Moscow. The tsar decides to attack Kazan. Malyuta swears loyalty to him and accompanies him there.

In the siege of Kazan of 1552, Ivan's army digs saps underneath the city and fills them with gunpowder. Kurbsky, nominally in command, is reprimanded by Ivan for senseless brutality against their prisoners, causing his resentment against Ivan to grow. Kazan falls to the Russian army. Here, Ivan meets Alexei Basmanov, a commoner who despises the boyars. Basmanov and his son Fyodor accompany the tsar back to Moscow.

During his return from Kazan, Ivan falls deathly ill. Yefrosinya, knowing that Kurbsky resents Ivan, urges him to swear allegiance to Vladimir, promising him rule over Moscow, as Vladimir is intellectually disabled and not fit to rule on his own. Ivan sends for the boyars and orders them to swear allegiance to his son, the infant Tsarevich Dmitry, (Note: Tsarevich is the title for the son of a Tsar, somewhat like a prince in English.) reminding them of the need for a single ruler to keep Russia united. The boyars, encouraged by Yefrosinya, refuse to do so. Ivan collapses and is thought dead. The boyars begin to swear allegiance to Vladimir, but when the tsarina hints that Ivan is not yet dead, Kurbsky hurriedly swears his allegiance to the tsarevich. Ivan recovers, and as a reward for his loyalty, Kurbsky is sent to the western border of the kingdom to fight against the Livonians and Poles. Alexei Basmanov is sent to the south to take care of the Crimean border. The promotion of a commoner creates more discontent amongst the boyars.

The boyars and the Archbishop Pimen plot against Ivan. Yefrosinya, to weaken Ivan and leave him without allies, plans to kill Anastasia. Just as the royal couple receives word that Kurbsky has surrendered to the Livonians, Yefrosinya slips a goblet of poisoned wine into their chambers. The news shocks the tsarina, who is already ill. Ivan, looking around for a drink to calm her, takes the wine and gives it to her, unknowingly killing her.

Ivan questions his own justifications and ability to rule, wondering if his wife's death and Kurbsky's final defection to Poland are God's punishment against him. He sends for his old friend, Kolychov. Alexei Basmanov suggests that he instead surround himself with men he can really trust, the oprichniki. He offers his son Fyodor in service to him as the first oprichnik.

Ivan abdicates and leaves Moscow for the town of Alexandrova Sloboda in 1564. When hundreds of common people come to him, he decides to return, saying that he will then rule with absolute power by the will of the people.

=== Part II: The Boyars' Plot ===
In 1565, Kurbsky swears allegiance to King Sigismund of Poland. Sigismund promises that after he exploits the tsar's absence by conquering Moscow, he will make Kurbsky ruler of Ivan's territories. The plan is foiled when a messenger announces that Ivan has returned to Moscow. In Moscow, Ivan declares the establishment of the zemshchina, small portions of land set aside for the boyars, and the oprichnina, all other lands, to be administrated by himself.

Kolychov, now known as Philip, arrives. Ivan, lacking allies, asks him to take the position of metropolitan of Moscow. He agrees, on the condition of being given the right to intercede for condemned men. Immediately after, Malyuta, on Ivan's orders, kills several boyars—three of which are Philip's kinsmen—before he can intercede for them, gaining his enmity.

While speaking with Philip, Ivan recalls witnessing his mother's death by poisoning, and how as a teenager he confronted the boyars Shuysky and Belsky. Shuysky wanted him to sign a trade contract with the Livonian Order, but Belsky wanted him to sign a trade contract with the Hanseatic League. After Shuysky insulted Ivan's mother and attempted to strike him, Ivan had the boyar executed, and declared that he would rule alone, as tsar.

Fyodor Basmanov suggests to the tsar that his wife was poisoned. Suspecting Yefrosinya of the murder, yet unwilling to act against a member of his family, Ivan orders him to keep silent until they are certain of her guilt. Meanwhile, Philip vows to block Ivan's abuse of power and confronts him in the cathedral while a mystery play about Shadrach, Meshach and Abednego is presented. As they argue, a boyar child confuses Ivan for Nebuchadnezzar and calls out, asking whether this is the "terrible heathen king". Ivan immediately grows certain that Yefrosinya killed his wife. He proclaims that he will be exactly what his enemies call him: terrible.

Some time after, Yefrosinya announces to the boyars that Ivan has arrested Philip, and will likely execute him. Having lost one of their most powerful allies, the boyars, along with the archbishop Pimen, decide to assassinate Ivan and install Vladimir onto the throne. For this task, they select the novice Pyotr Volynets.

Ivan invites Vladimir to a banquet, at which the latter gets drunk and reveals the boyars' plot. Ivan, feigning surprise at Vladimir's revelation, suggests Vladimir try being tsar. He has the oprichniki dress Vladimir in royal garments and bow to him. Vladimir then leads them to the cathedral in prayer. Pyotr, hiding in the cathedral, mistakes him for the tsar and fatally stabs him.

Yefrosinya arrives, celebrating the death of Ivan. After seeing him alive, she finds the body of her son and goes insane. Ivan pardons the assassin, thanking him for killing not only "a fool", but "the tsar's worst enemy". He proclaims to his oprichniki that all his enemies within Moscow are vanquished, therefore, he can now turn his attention to those outside.

== Cast ==
- Nikolay Cherkasov as Ivan the Terrible
  - Erik Pyryev as young Ivan
- Lyudmila Tselikovskaya as Anastasia Romanovna, Ivan's wife
- Serafima Birman as Yefrosinya Staritskaya, Ivan's aunt
- Pavel Kadochnikov as Vladimir Staritsky, Yefrosinya's son and Ivan's cousin
- Mikhail Zharov as Malyuta Skuratov, Ivan's right-hand man and an oprichnik
- Amvrosy Buchma as Alexei Basmanov, an oprichnik
- Mikhail Kuznetsov as Fyodor Basmanov, Alexei Basmanov's son and an oprichnik
- Mikhail Nazvanov as Prince Andrey Kurbsky
- Andrei Abrikosov as Fyodor Kolychov, later Philip II, Metropolitan of Moscow
- Aleksandr Mgebrov as Pimen, Archbishop of Novgorod
- Maxim Mikhailov as the protodeacon
- Vsevolod Pudovkin as Nikola, a holy fool
- Pavel Massalsky as King Sigismund II Augustus of Poland
- Vladimir Balashov as Pyotr Volynets
- Ada Voytsik as Elena Glinskaya, Ivan's mother
- Semyon Timoshenko as the Livonian ambassador

== Production ==
=== Development ===
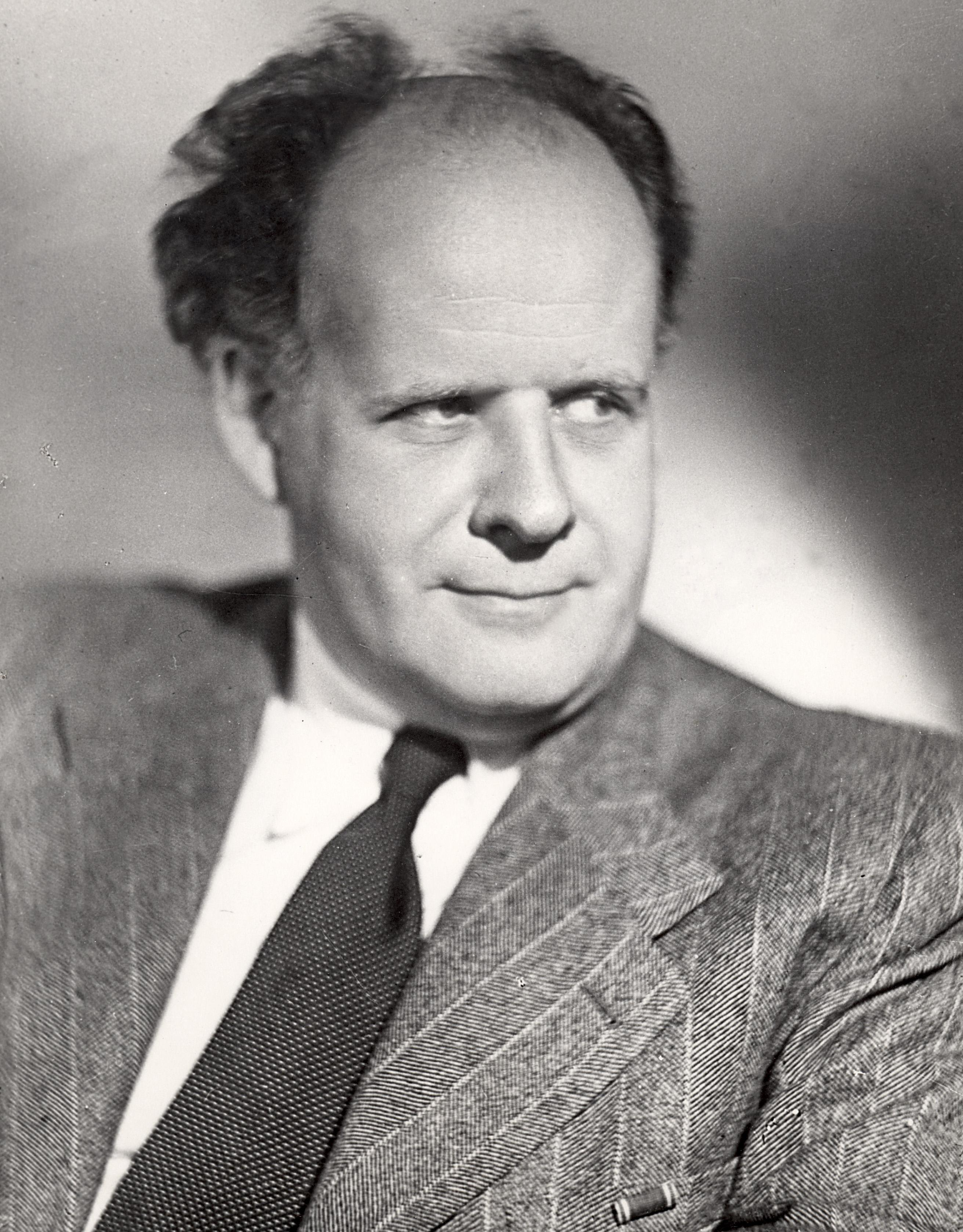
Sergei Eisenstein c. 1940

In May 1940, film director Sergei Eisenstein wrote to Minister of Cinematography Ivan Bolshakov about two screenplays he planned to co-write with Lev Sheinin. The first was about British World War I officer T. E. Lawrence and the second was about the Beilis affair, the 1913 trial of a Jewish man who was falsely accused of killing a gentile boy. Eisenstein also had a film about Russian poet Alexander Pushkin in mind. When Bolshakov did not reply, Eisenstein and Sheinin wrote directly to Soviet leader Joseph Stalin on 31 December, expanding on their ideas for the Beilis film, but this project was rejected in January 1941. That month Eisenstein met with Andrei Zhdanov, chairman of the Russian Supreme Soviet, who instead commissioned on Stalin's behalf a film about the Russian Tsar Ivan IV, commonly known by his epithet "the Terrible".

To our benefactor it seems that up until now we have been too sentimental and that it is time to come to our senses. Peter the Great no longer appears to be an appropriate parallel. The new enthusiasm, openly professed, is for the Terrible tsar, the oprichnina and cruelty. New operas, plays and film scripts are being written on this topic.

— Writer Boris Pasternak in a letter to his cousin Olga Freidenberg, 4 February 1941

Stalin admired Ivan, considering him to be a "great and wise" ruler. He was interested in rehabilitating Ivan's reputation as the founder of the modern Russian state. Ivan the Terrible was among several historical films produced during the 1930s and 1940s, intended to draw parallels between Russian historical figures and contemporary Soviet politics. Other such works included Vladimir Petrov's Peter the Great (1937), Vsevolod Pudovkin's Minin and Pozharsky (1939) and Eisenstein's previous film, Alexander Nevsky (1938). An official campaign to commission works of art depicting Ivan in a positive light was launched in the winter of 1940–1941. At the same time as the commission of Eisenstein's film, a play about Ivan was commissioned, to be written by Alexey Nikolayevich Tolstoy, and several operas about Ivan were in the works. The operas were abandoned following the German invasion of the USSR in 1941.

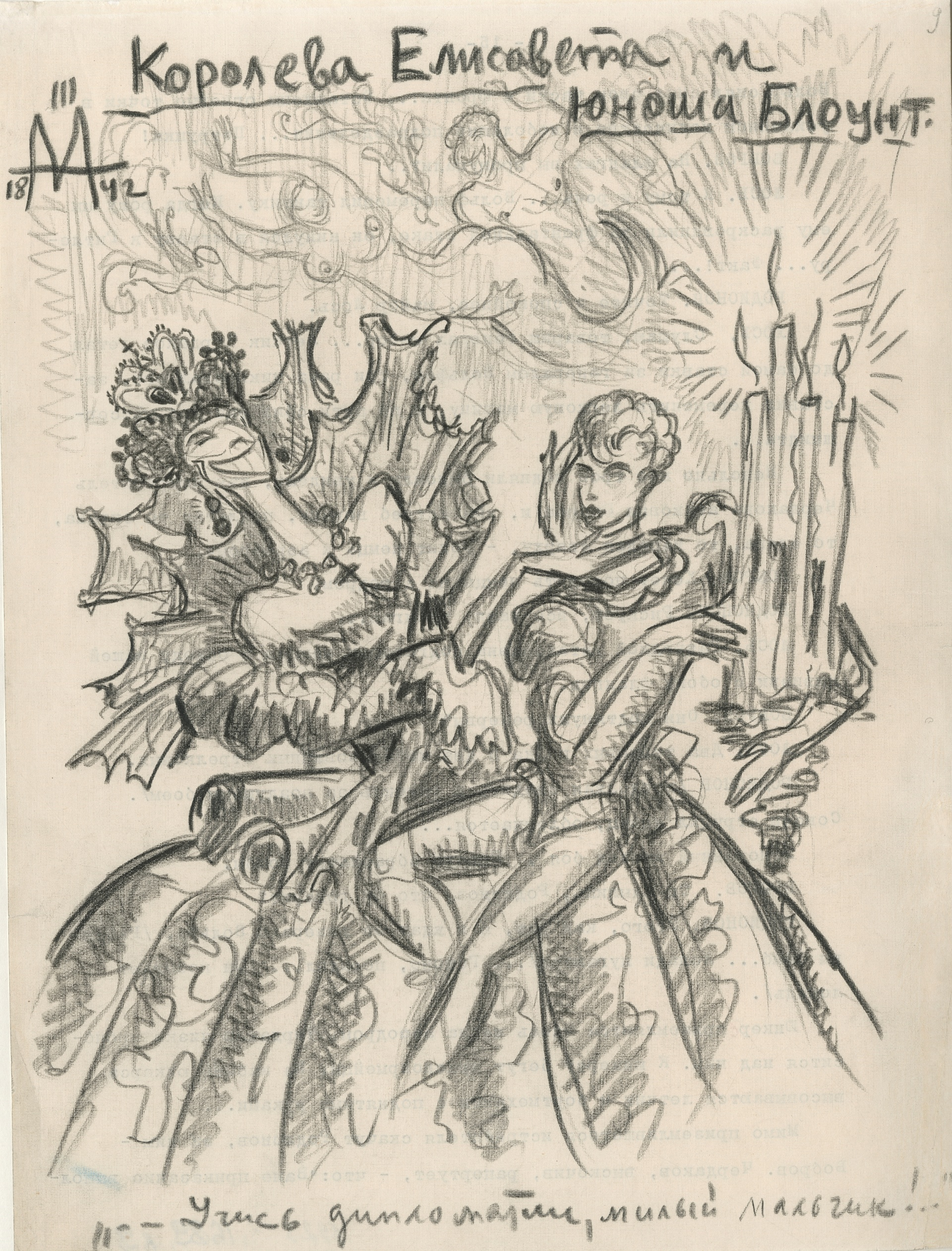
A 1942 drawing of Queen Elizabeth I made by Eisenstein for the film. Elizabeth was intended to have been portrayed by Mikhail Romm.

Eisenstein began research on the film in early 1941. Among his sources were Heinrich von Staden and Andrey Kurbsky, who wrote about their lives in Ivan's court, as well as Ivan's correspondence with Kurbsky. Eisenstein also read the biography of Ivan by Robert Wipper and the writings of historians Sergei Solovyov, Vasily Klyuchevsky, Alexander Pypin and Igor Grabar. Eisenstein filled over a hundred notebooks with his ideas for the film.

Eisenstein submitted the first draft of the Ivan the Terrible screenplay to film studio Mosfilm in May 1941. After the invasion of the USSR in June 1941, he planned to modify the screenplay to emphasize the antagonistic nature of the Germanic forces of the Holy Roman Emperor, the Livonian Knights and the Hanseatic League and to downplay the role of Poland as Russia's enemy; Eisenstein also planned to show more of Ivan's positive relations with the English. The scenes with the English were ultimately removed in 1942 at Bolshakov's request, ostensibly due to historical inaccuracy, but possibly also due to cooling of relations between the UK and the USSR that year.

Due to the invasion, Mosfilm was evacuated to Alma-Ata. Eisenstein moved there in October 1941 and completed the screenplay in December. It was approved in September 1942.

=== Casting ===
Casting for the film began in early 1942. Eisenstein invited Nikolay Cherkasov, who had previously performed the title role in Eisenstein's Alexander Nevsky, to play Ivan. The 39-year-old Cherkasov portrayed Ivan from the ages of 17 to 53; for the portrayal of 17-year-old Ivan, makeup artist Vasily Goriunov used adhesive to pull back the flesh on Cherkasov's face. Mikhail Zharov, who wanted to perform the role of Kurbsky, was instead offered the role of Malyuta. Mikhail Nazvanov was cast as Kurbsky in mid-1942. Erik Pyryev, son of director Ivan Pyryev, performed the role of the young Ivan; Erik's mother, Ada Voytsik, played the role of Ivan's mother, Elena Glinskaya.

Eisenstein wanted his colleague Pudovkin to play the archbishop Pimen, but Pudovkin was filming In the Name of the Fatherland (1943) at the time; then he suffered a heart attack and could not accept the role. He ultimately played the holy fool Nikola. Aleksandr Mgrebov was then considered for the role of Pimen. Unknown to Eisenstein, he was seriously ill with tuberculosis. When Eisenstein learned about Mgrebov's illness, he organized medical treatment for the actor, who later credited Eisenstein with saving his life.

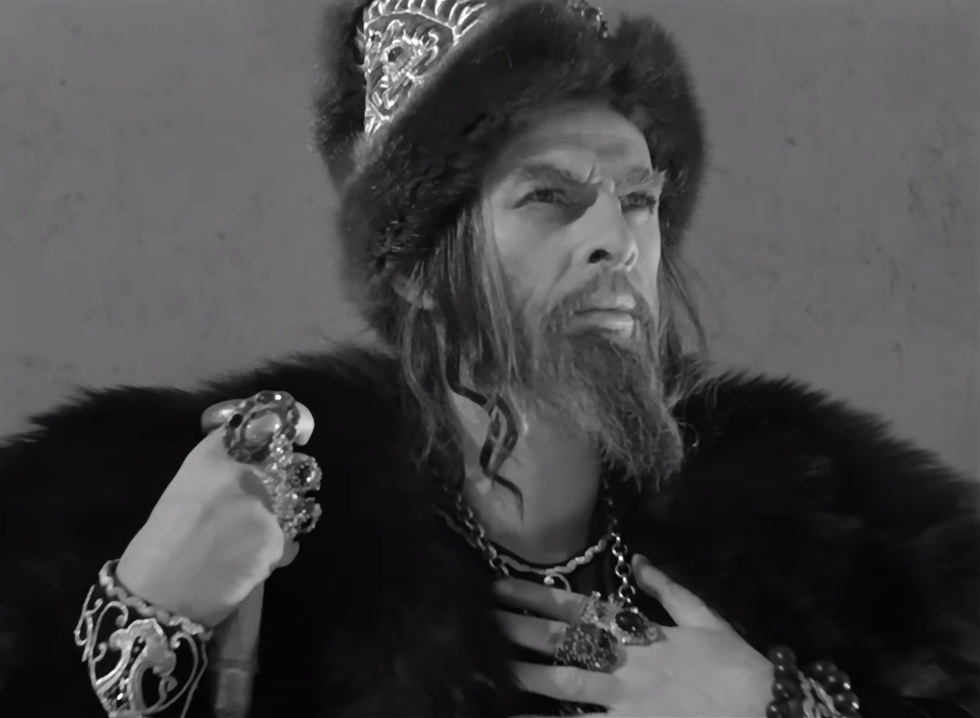
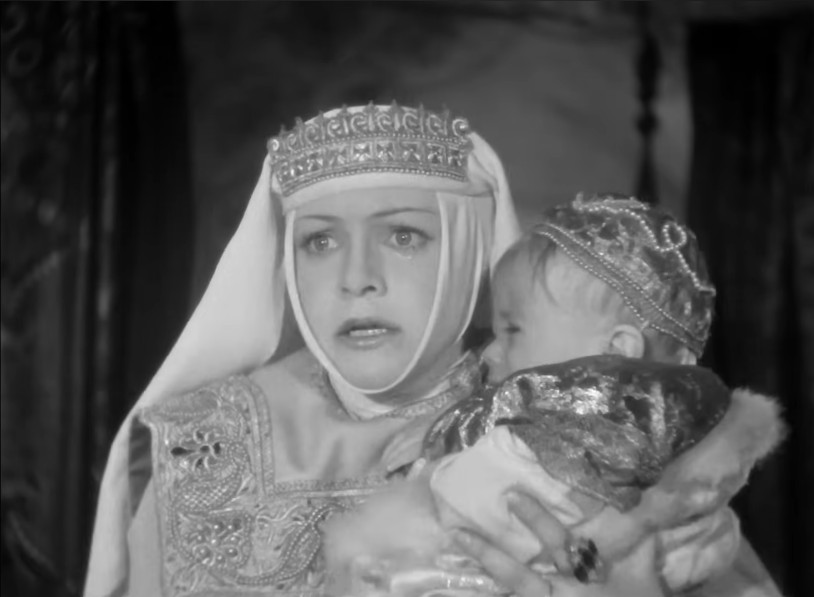
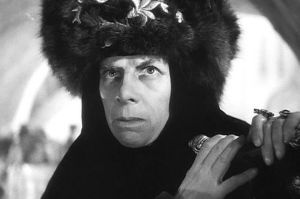
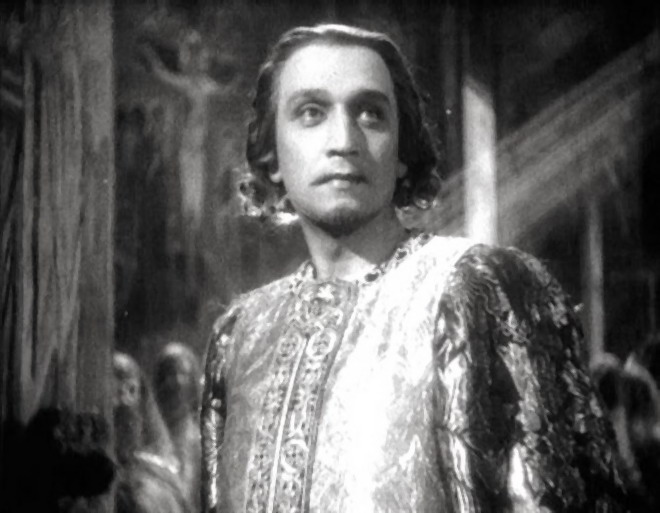
Nikolay Cherkasov, Lyudmila Tselikovskaya, Serafima Birman and Mikhail Nazvanov in the film

Eisenstein began to consider Mikhail Kuznetsov for the role of Fyodor Basmanov after noticing his performance in Mashenka (1942). After Kuznetsov, along with most actors working with Mosfilm, evacuated to Alma-Ata, Eisenstein offered him the role. Kuznetsov, who had studied at the Moscow Art Theatre and was trained in the Stanislavski method, continually clashed with Eisenstein over acting method. Eisenstein in turn grew frustrated when Kuznetsov questioned the reasons for performing a scene in a specific way. Kuznetsov reflected in an interview in 1968 that although he held great respect for Eisenstein, he felt that the director did not understand how to work with actors, and added that actors in Eisenstein's films were "in the cage of his imagination".

For the role of Vladimir Staritsky, Eisenstein had wanted Nikolay Okhlopkov, but he was too old for the part. Therefore, Pavel Kadochnikov, who had arrived in Alma-Ata to film The Defense of Tsaritsyn (1942), was invited to play Vladimir. He also played a clown in the mystery play in Part II, and was meant to play Evstafy, a kinsman of Philip, in Part III. He was also considered for the role of King Sigismund. Ultimately, Pavel Massalsky was cast as Sigismund.

The actresses for Anastasia and Yefrosinya were found six months after filming began. Eisenstein convinced ballerina Galina Ulanova to do several screen tests for the role of Anastasia, but filming conflicted with her dancing career, and she rejected the role. Ultimately, Lyudmila Tselikovskaya, who was Zharov's wife, was cast as the tsarina. Eisenstein wanted to cast Faina Ranevskaya as Yefrosinya, but Bolshakov, who had final say on casting choice, insisted that Ranevskaya, as a Jewish actress, was an unsuitable choice to play the boyarina. After several months of attempting to receive approval to cast Ranevskaya, Eisenstein relented. The role then went to Serafima Birman. Birman was unpopular with the rest of the cast and crew, and frequently clashed with Eisenstein about the correct way she and the other actors should perform their roles. Nazvanov complained to his wife at one point that Birman "delayed things terribly with her endless conversations, proposals and rehearsals".

=== Music ===
The score for the film was composed by Sergei Prokofiev, with whom Eisenstein had collaborated on Alexander Nevsky. Eisenstein wrote to Prokofiev in March 1942, asking him to compose the score for Ivan the Terrible; Prokofiev arrived in May. Vladimir Lugovskoy wrote the lyrics to the songs, and Abram Stasevich conducted the music.

Prokofiev incorporated music from an unrealized production of an adaptation of Pushkin's Boris Godunov into the score. He was also inspired by composer Nikolai Rimsky-Korsakov's opera The Snow Maiden when writing the score, and incorporated the text of the Song of the Beaver from the opera into the score of Ivan. He normally wrote the music to the film before principal photography, based on Eisenstein's pencil sketches and descriptions of the scenes. He would then record a piano arrangement for the scene, to be played while shooting; if all went well, he would then write an orchestral arrangement of the piece. In total, he wrote 29 numbers for the two completed parts of the film. He did not finish writing the score of Part I until August 1944. In January of 1945, he suffered a concussion, and was too ill to work. In spite of Prokofiev's request that Eisenstein instead work with Gavriil Popov, Eisenstein insisted on working with him. He partially recovered by October of that year and was able to complete the score for Part II.

=== Filming ===
Filming was delayed until April 1943 due to the ongoing invasion of the USSR. Since 1924, Eisenstein had worked exclusively with cinematographer Eduard Tisse for his feature films. In 1942, Eisenstein became friends with Andrei Moskvin, and considered hiring him as cinematographer, as he wanted a different look for Ivan. Eisenstein was concerned that Tisse, without his protection, could be arrested due to his "Germanic" surname; Tisse had already been threatened by the police. Cinematography was therefore divided between the two: Tisse shot the exteriors, and Moskvin, who became director of photography, filmed all interior scenes. The color sequences of Part II were also filmed by Moskvin.

Eisenstein was a demanding director—he would have his actors hold difficult poses while he continuously reshot scenes. Birman recounted that Tselikovskaya, when filming the scene of Anastasia's funeral, was made to spend a whole night in a coffin, because Eisenstein refused to let her out. Nazvanov, who played Kurbsky, recounted that at one point, when Cherkasov was hysterically crying from exhaustion, Eisenstein "looked coolly on, while eating his dinner". Nazvanov also commented that he had to "admire Eisenstein's iron tenacity as he literally tramples people's hearts and even their bodies in striding toward his goal in creating, in such hellish conditions, a monumental work of art." However, the cast members recalled that Eisenstein kept the mood light-hearted on set, and that he inspired both cast and crew to believe they were engaged in one of the most significant projects of their lifetime.

Most of the production was shot in Kazakhstan, in Alma-Ata; the siege of Kazan sequence was shot in the town of Kaskelen, 30 kilometers from Alma-Ata. Filming was done at night, since electricity was limited during the day. Food was scarce; to hide the malnutrition of the actors, the costume designer sewed cotton "muscles" into the costumes. Eisenstein had planned to finish the film by 1944, but production was continually delayed due to wartime shortages and illness of the personnel. By July 1944, Eisenstein still had not finished filming. Production of the film was transferred to Moscow. Bolshakov ordered Eisenstein to complete both Parts I and II by the end of 1944. Eisenstein finished editing Part I in August.

By February 1945, one-third of Part II still needed to be filmed. Shooting was scheduled to begin on May 15, but could only commence on June 26. The delay was down to Moskvin not being available at that time and Eisenstein insisting on working only with him, in spite of pressure from Mosfilm to work with a different cinematographer. Although most of the film was shot in black and white, there are color sequences of a dance and banquet in the second part, as well as Ivan's final speech to the oprichniki, which are part of the very last scenes which were shot for the film. Eisenstein filmed these scenes in Moscow, as Prokofiev's score for the scenes was not ready before Mosfilm ended their evacuation in Alma-Ata. While waiting for Prokofiev, Eisenstein attended a conference on color in film, and was so impressed by the vivid red colors in a documentary on the Potsdam Conference that he shot his final scenes in color. The shooting of the color scenes was done using Agfacolor film obtained from Germany. Shooting was completed that year. Mikhail Kalatozov, head of Mosfilm, ordered Eisenstein on 21 December to complete editing of Ivan and submit Part II to Mosfilm by 5 January 1946; Eisenstein submitted the film on 6 February.

=== Planned third part ===
Eisenstein had originally planned to make only two parts to the film but, by 1944, he had too much footage for two parts. He was also concerned that the reception of the film would suffer, as Part I would seem unfinished and Part II lacked a triumphant ending. He therefore asked for, and received, permission to divide the film into three parts. Part III, which began production in 1946, was abandoned after Part II was banned. Its plot was to include Ivan's growing paranoia of his followers, his attack of Novgorod and a battle against Livonian troops which Ivan wins, thus gaining access to the Baltic Sea at the cost of Malyuta's life. Part III would have also introduced the characters of the oprichnik Heinrich von Staden and Queen Elizabeth I, played by Oleg Zhakov and Mikhail Romm respectively. Although some of the footage shot for Part III was destroyed, a few minutes of footage do survive, including scenes with von Staden. The screen tests of Romm as Elizabeth survive as well.

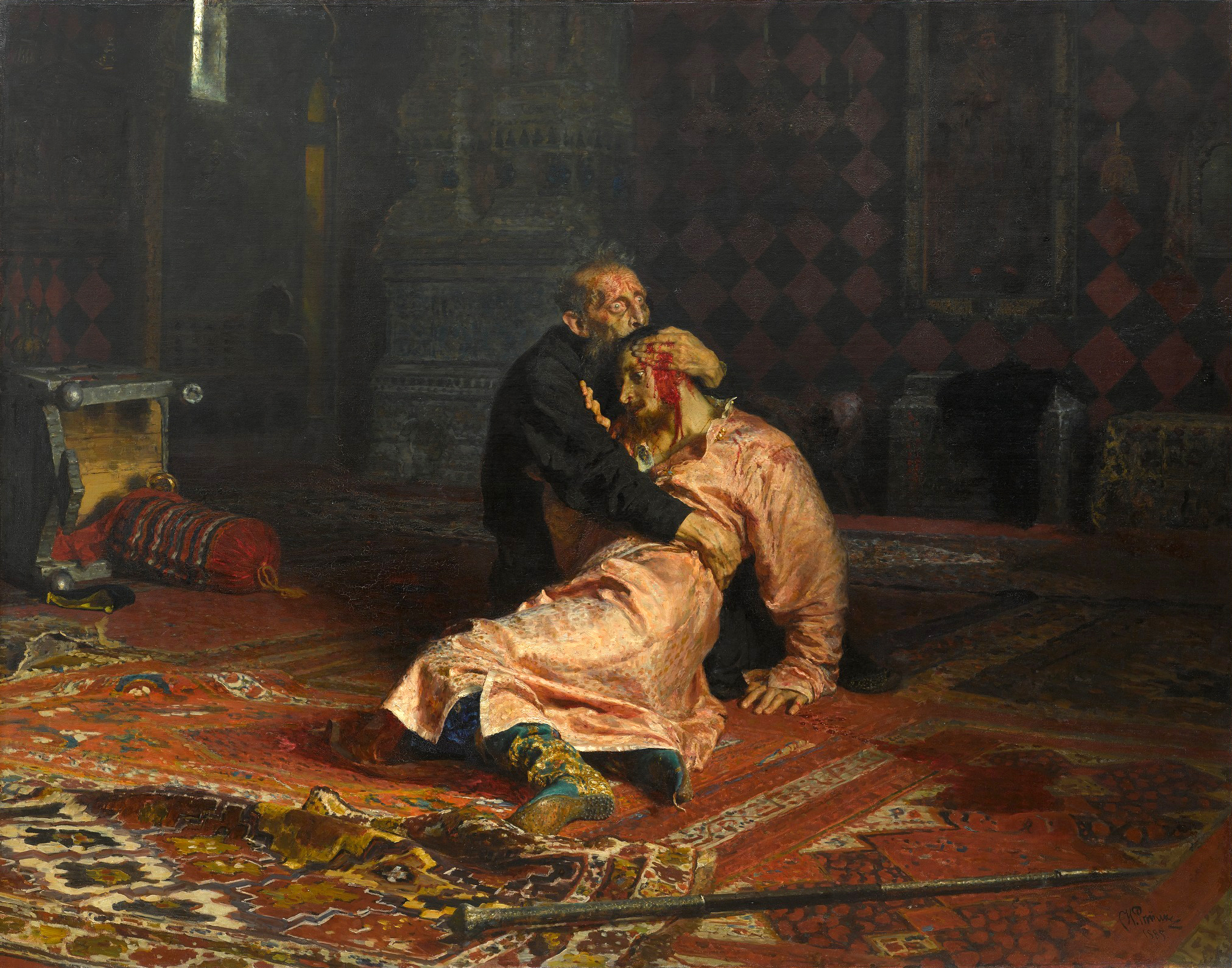
Ivan the Terrible and His Son Ivan on 16 November 1581 by Ilya Repin, made in the 1880s. Eisenstein considered writing an ending where Ivan dies alone after murdering his son.

The published screenplay ends with Ivan walking triumphantly toward the sea, but Eisenstein contemplated several more endings for Part III. One had the aged tsar contemplating the future of Russia, and a second had him dying alone after murdering his son. Another ending had Ivan seeing a prophetic vision of Peter the Great conquering the Baltic Sea, having himself lost the sea just weeks after conquering it.

== Themes and analysis ==
=== Ivan as Stalin ===
Critics generally agree that Ivan is meant to represent Stalin, and Eisenstein in his writings explicitly identified Ivan with Stalin. The two parts of Ivan contrast in their treatment of Stalinism. Part I has been seen by commentators as supportive of Stalin, and Part II as more critical. Bernd Uhlenbruch compared the dynamic of Ivan and Kurbsky to Stalin and Leon Trotsky, commenting that like Trotsky, Kurbsky went into exile, and compared Malyuta to head of the NKVD Lavrentiy Beria. He wrote that every criticism Ivan's opposition have of him could be understood as an indictment against Stalin. Director Mikhail Romm, who was present at the first screening of Part II in 1946, reported that the audience saw Stalin, Beria and the NKVD in Ivan, Malyuta and the oprichniki respectively. He suggested that the film had been banned because it had been interpreted as an attack on Stalin. Film historian Neya Zorkaya commented that although Ivan was meant to glorify autocracy and justify any acts done for the sake of the "great Russian state", the effect produced was the opposite.

I said, 'Sergei Mikhailovich, what’s going on? Look, 1,200 boyars have been killed. The Tsar is "Terrible"! Why on earth is he repenting?' Suddenly Eisenstein said, 'Stalin has killed more people and he doesn't repent. Let him see this and perhaps he’ll repent...'

— Mikhail Kuznetsov, on filming Ivan the Terrible: Part III

The film has been interpreted as a defense of Stalin as well. In the Soviet writer Aleksandr Solzhenitsyn's 1962 novel One Day in the Life of Ivan Denisovich, two characters debate the merits of Ivan the Terrible; one of them describes Eisenstein as "an ass-kisser who followed orders like a dog". Critic Richard Taruskin wrote that the film "is dedicated to the proposition that abstract historical purposes justify bloody acts in the here and now." Scholar Katerina Clark wrote that Ivan's reign in the film was an allegory for Stalin's rule, and that it asserted Stalin's greatness as a unifier of the country. One reviewer for Time magazine wrote that although Eisenstein presents Ivan, and therefore Stalin, as a paranoiac and power maniac, "it cannot be said that Eisenstein is protesting the horror and the madness he portrays. He seems rather...to be trying to explain to himself the hideous paradox that Stalin, in 1943, had become Russia's savior."

=== Historicity ===
Eisenstein wrote in 1941 that he aimed to challenge the negative interpretations of Ivan, and to depict him as a wise and able statesman. He also wrote that his depiction of the tsar was not intended to whitewash him or to depict him as less harsh than he was, but rather to show him "in the whole range of his activity and the struggle for the state of Muscovy." Historian Joan Neuberger argued that contrary to his official position, Eisenstein had no intention to glorify Ivan, as he chose to focus on the oprichnina and the bloodiest years of Ivan's reign, while completely excluding his positive reforms from the film.

Eisenstein was generally uninterested in maintaining historical accuracy in his films, and took liberties with historical fact to develop his narrative. He replaced Metropolitan Macarius and Sylvester, the historical allies of Ivan, with Metropolitan Philip II and Pimen of Novgorod, who oppose the tsar in the film. He invented romantic tension between Prince Kurbsky and Anastasia to create personal strife for Ivan, and to give Kurbsky a reason to resent and envy him. There is no historical evidence that Yefrosinya Staritskaya poisoned Anastasia Romanovna; Pyotr Volynets did not kill Vladimir Staritsky, and several characters, such as the holy fool Nikola, are invented for the film.

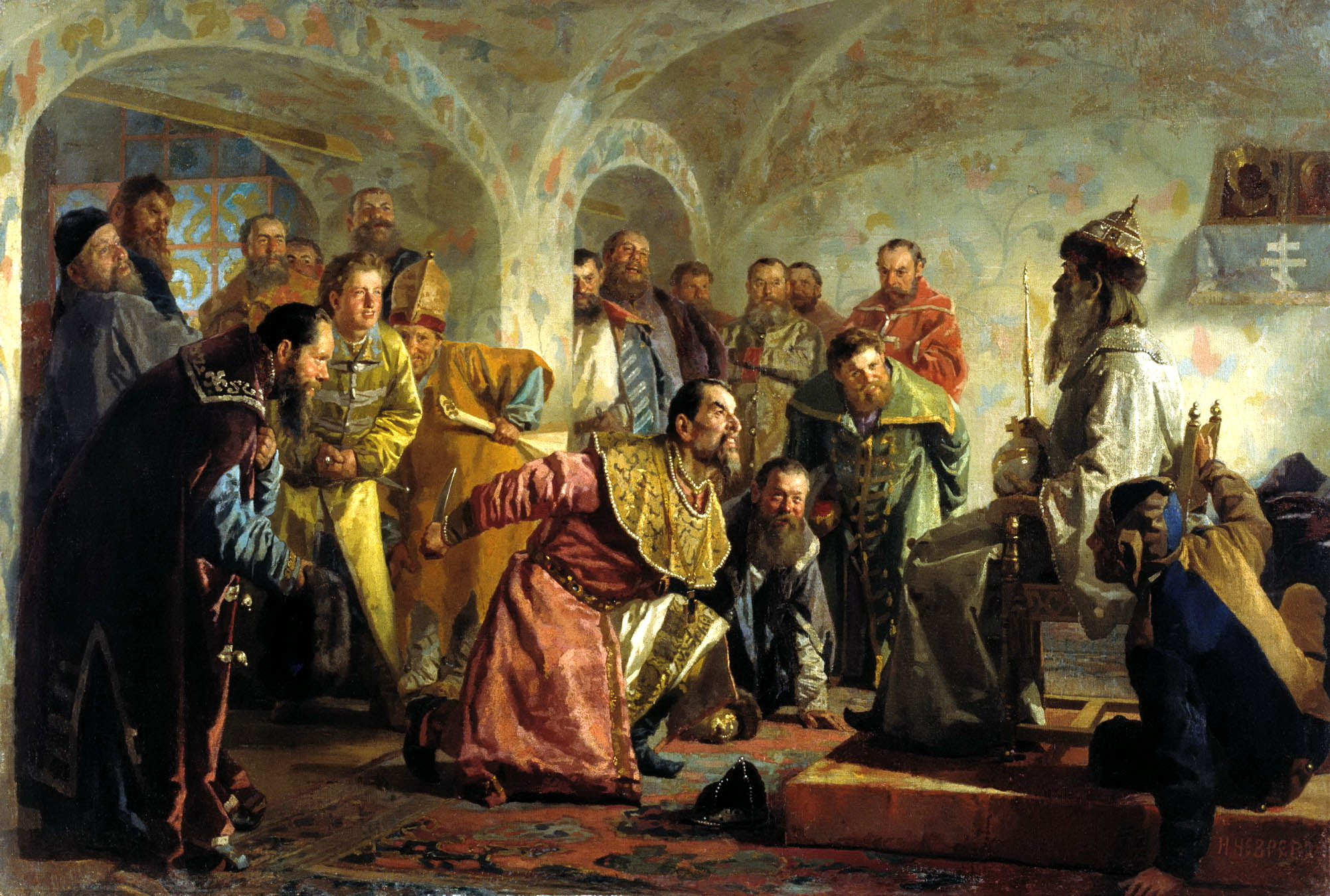
1870s painting by Nikolai Nevrev depicting the legendary execution of Ivan Fyodorov-Chelyadnin

Vladimir's death in the film differs from historical accounts. Although it is believed that he was forced to poison himself, in the film he is stabbed by Pyotr Volynets. Critic Viktor Shklovsky suggested that Vladimir's death in Ivan was inspired by the legend of the execution of the boyar Ivan Fyodorov of the Chelyadnin family. According to the story, Ivan invited Fyodorov-Chelyadnin to sit on the royal throne, dressed in royal robes, bowed to him and then stabbed him in the heart. Vladimir's death in the film mirrors this legend: Ivan dresses Vladimir in royal robes, seats Vladimir on his throne and bows to him; he is then stabbed.

Although Eisenstein was condemned in an official resolution published by the Central Committee in 1946 for "ignorance in his depiction of historical facts" and Stalin criticized the film for its historical inaccuracies, he reportedly approved of a suggested change to show Ivan winning the Livonian War in Part III, although in fact he had been defeated. Film historian Kristin Thompson wrote that the reason for this change was to draw a parallel to the German invasion of the USSR, and to show the Russian nation triumphant over Germans (the film refers to the Livonian and Hanseatic nations as "German").

Historian Maureen Perrie wrote that the events Eisenstein included in his original script show that he was consciously drawing a parallel to contemporary events. Eisenstein initially downplayed the role of Poland as Russia's historical enemy, as the invasion by Germany made Poland into "fellow Slav victims of German aggression". He also emphasized England's role as a Russian ally, to point to the UK being an ally of the USSR (although Bolshakov requested that he remove the scenes with the English, due to cooling of relations in 1942 between the UK and the USSR). The film also meant to show Estonians and Latvians fighting on the side of Ivan as he took the Baltic ports. Perrie wrote that the film's planned treatment of the Baltic nations mirrored Soviet politics concerning the Baltics. Eisenstein asserted "Russia's ancient rights to the Baltic ports", depicted "Baltic peoples welcoming the Russian invaders as liberators" and stressed "Russia's benevolence towards the indigenous population".

=== Religion ===
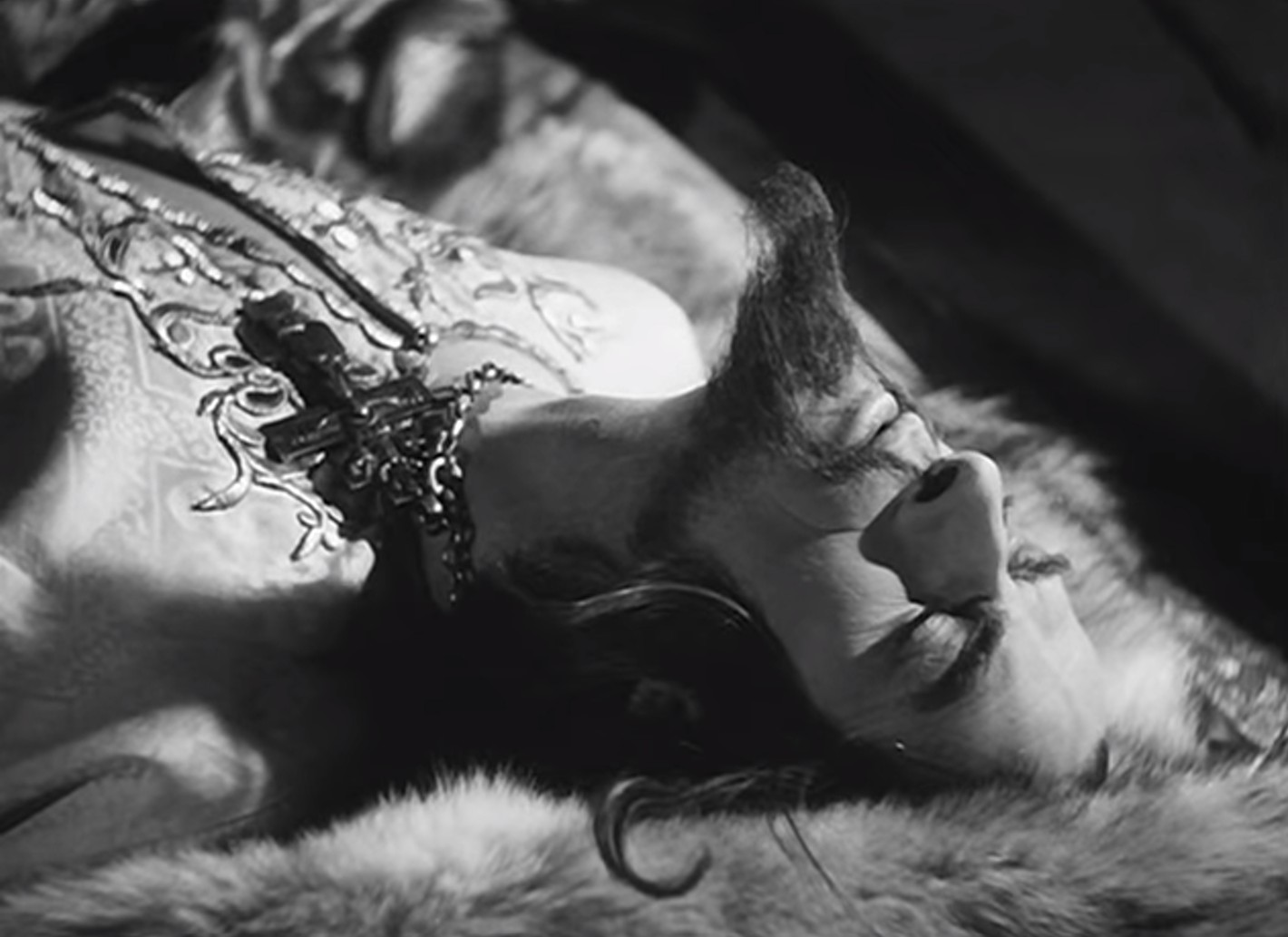
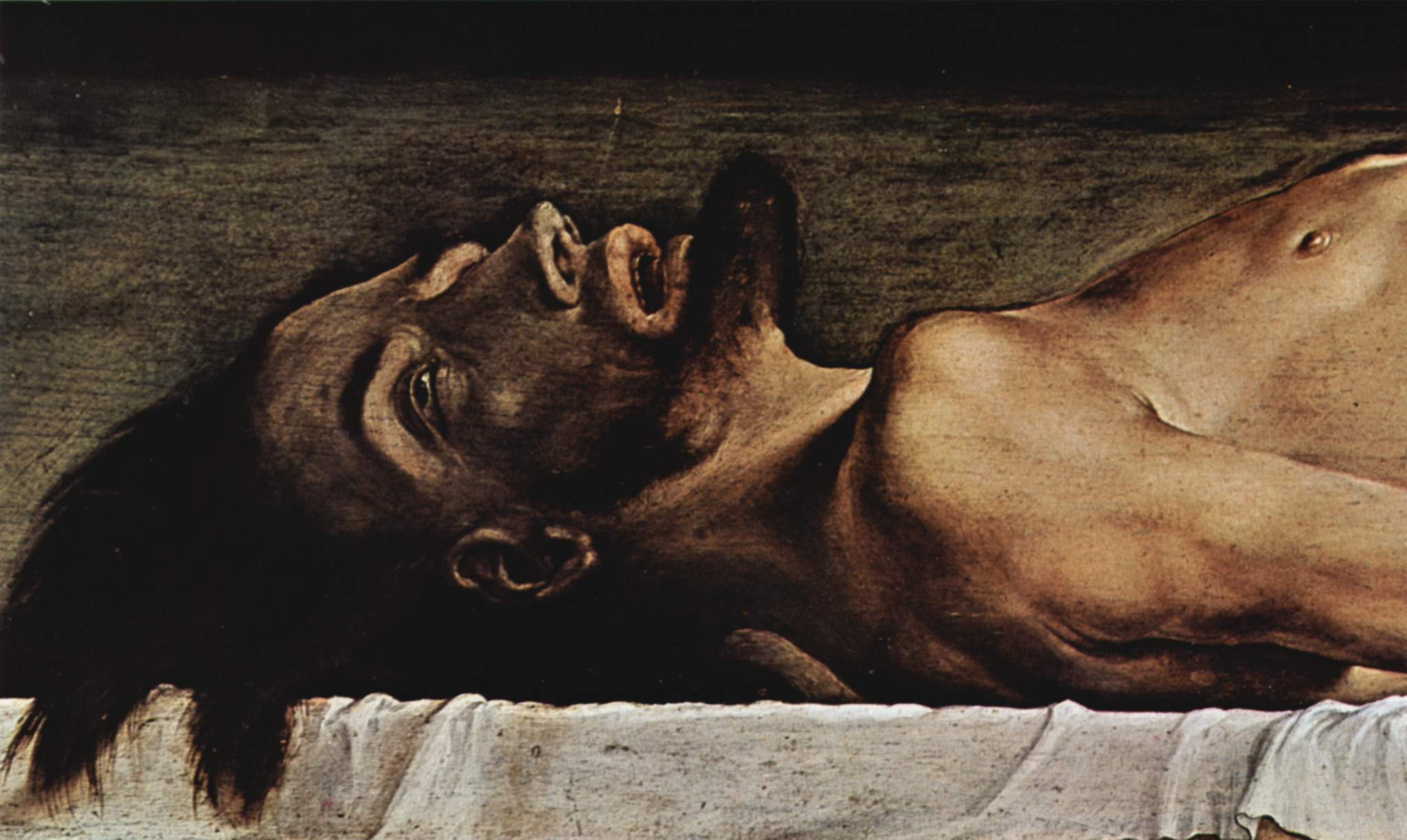
Yuri Tsivian compared Ivan's "death" scene to Hans Holbein the Younger's depiction of the Dead Christ.

At the time that Ivan the Terrible was being produced, the Soviet government was softening its anti-religious policy to gain support from the Russian Orthodox Church for the war against Nazi Germany. Ivan the Terrible's stance on religion, in contrast, is negative. Soviet historians ignored religion in the life of Ivan or, in the case of Robert Wipper, describe the Church as an ally of Ivan, but Eisenstein depicts the Church as traitorous, and as a power that supports tradition and the interest of the boyars. Historian Charles J. Halperin argued that the portrayal of Philip, who was canonized by the Church, as a scheming boyar, is particularly hostile towards the Church.

Religious imagery and allusions, such as icons, appear in nearly every scene, and are used to comment on the nature of the characters. Eisenstein tasked the makeup artist, Vasily Goriunov, with making Ivan resemble Nebuchadnezzar, Judas, Mephistopheles and Jesus Christ throughout the film. During the film, Ivan watches a play about Shadrach, Meshach and Abednego, a biblical story that ends with the tyrant Nebuchadnezzar recognizing his folly, repenting and submitting to God. In contrast, Ivan does not repent or change; instead of submitting to God, he asserts himself as a God.

The film is replete with comparisons of Ivan to Christ in particular. Film historian Yuri Tsivian wrote that Ivan in the scene of his near-death resembles Hans Holbein the Younger's Dead Christ, and compared a scene where Anastasia holds his foot to Renaissance depictions of Mary Magdalene mourning Christ. Neuberger compared the scene where Ivan and his dying mother hold each other to the Virgin Mary holding Christ. Director Slava Tsukerman, in his article for film magazine Iskusstvo Kino, observed that Ivan says "Let this cup pass me by", quoting Christ's words from the Agony in the Garden. Of the three characters in the film associated with the cup (itself a symbol of death), Ivan survives, but Anastasia and Vladimir do not.

Daniil Lyakhovich, also writing for Iskusstvo Kino, compared him to an Antichrist figure, stating that Christ sacrifices himself to perform God's will, whereas Ivan sacrifices his country to assert his own will, independent from God, and that he ultimately builds a world where he takes the place of God and goes against the morals of his religion. Film historian Naum Kleiman commented that the actions of Ivan were those of a secular ruler trying to replace God; Neuberger wrote that Ivan is "Lucifer, still needing to rise again, still wanting to be God."

=== Gender and homoeroticism ===
Albert LaValley wrote that Eisenstein associated men with physical strength, power and leadership, and women with maternity, support and moral strength. In his films, masculine women and feminine men — characters who transgress their assigned gender roles — are negative characters. LaValley asserted that in Ivan the Terrible, masculinity is always tied to power, and femininity is associated with weakness. Yefrosinya's masculinity, although making her horrifying and grotesque, simultaneously makes her a powerful and a formidable enemy; Vladimir's femininity makes him cowardly, fearful, dependent on his mother and powerless. Neuberger stated that Eisenstein characterizes Sigismund as a feminine king who seems strong but is actually weak, and Elizabeth as a masculine queen who seems weak but is truly strong (going so far as to cast a male actor, Mikhail Romm, in the role of Elizabeth). David Gillespie asserted that Ivan's political triumphs are represented as a triumph of his masculinity but that masculinity is also charged with negative attributes such as violence and aggression. Gillespie also argued that Anastasia and Vladimir are both the only sympathetic and the only feminine characters, and that the latter's death marks the "final destruction of the feminine, all that is soft, humane and civilized."

Ivan the Terrible has been interpreted as having a homoerotic subtext, particularly in regards to the characters of Fyodor Basmanov, Ivan and Vladimir. Gillespie commented that the male body is depicted with "erotic fascination". Eisenstein wrote in his production notes that Fyodor must love Ivan and described his role as the replacement of Anastasia, or as an ersatz version of Anastasia. Gillespie described Fyodor as "replac[ing] Anastasia in the marital bed"; Sultan Usuvaliev described him as the incarnation of Anastasia's love for Ivan. In the banquet scene, Fyodor dances in a parody of Anastasia's clothing. Viktor Shklovsky commented that the historical Fyodor Basmanov was alleged to have had sexual relations with men and suggests that the banquet scene draws inspiration from this image of Basmanov. Meanwhile, Vladimir is depicted as uninterested in women; Gillespie argued that this depiction is intentional, as the historical Vladimir was married and a father.

Critic Dwight Macdonald interpreted the characters as being homosexual, commenting that "[Eisenstein]'s homosexuality has free play... Ivan has a favorite, a flirtatious, bold-eyed police agent, and many excuses are found for having Ivan put his hands on the handsome young face" and characterized Vladimir as one of the openly homosexual characters in the film. Eisenstein is believed to have had relationships with both men and women; his biographer, Marie Seton, interpreted Vladimir as homosexual, and asserted that by killing Vladimir on screen, Eisenstein was metaphorically killing his own supposed homosexuality. Critic Thomas Waugh in his analysis of Eisenstein's work wrote that Vladimir was the only explicit reference to homosexuality in Eisenstein's entire career, and suggested that Eisenstein portrayed him in a negative manner because of the need to portray homosexuality as a negative quality. Kristin Thompson and historian Ronald Bergan disagreed with Macdonald's interpretation of the characters as homosexual. Bergan wrote that Ivan and Fyodor were depicted as no more than close friends, that Fyodor's dance in feminine clothing was a reference to Chinese opera (which Eisenstein admired) and that none of the characters were depicted as homosexual.

=== Power ===
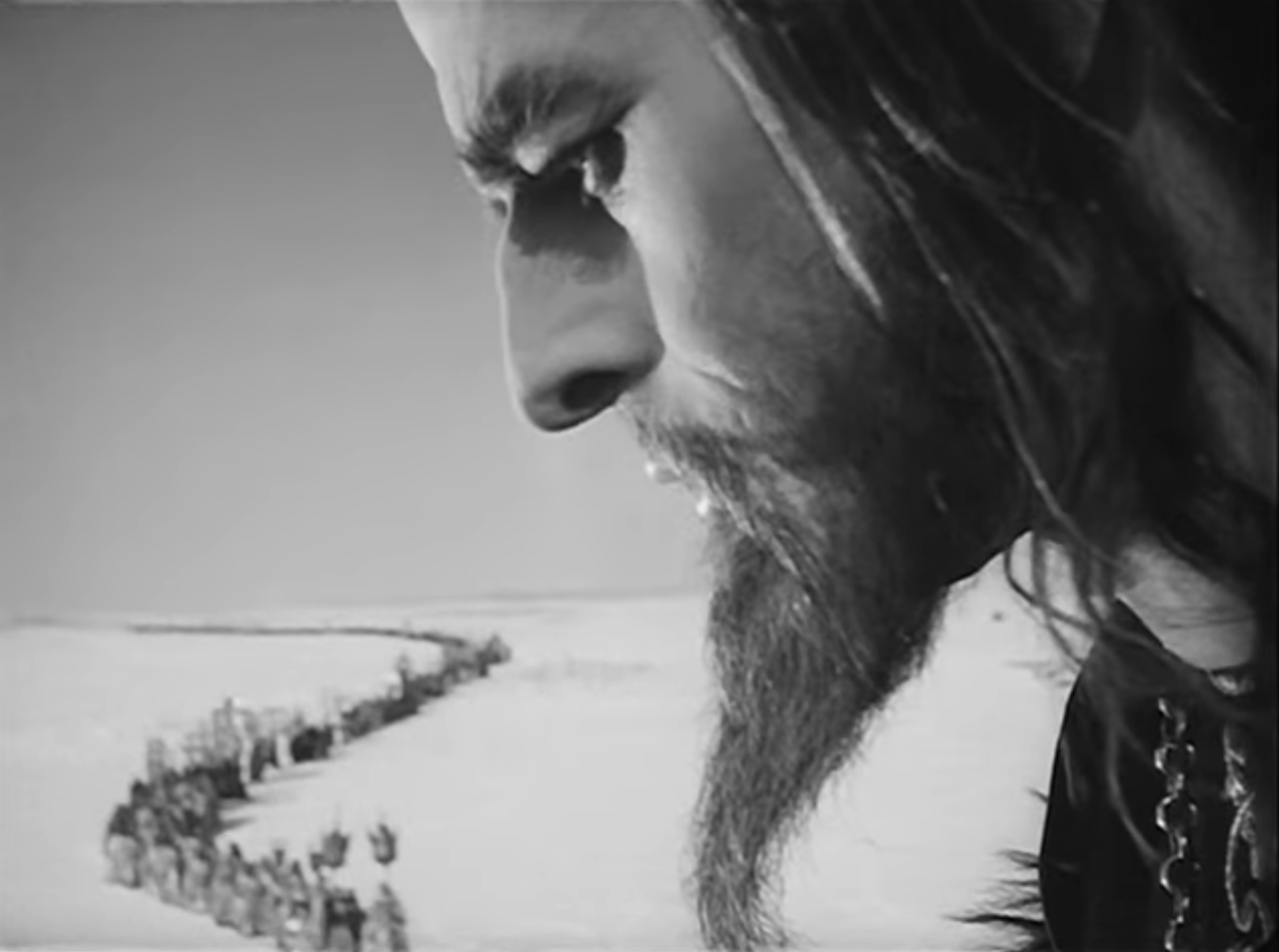
Ivan attains power at the cost of personal connection. This shot emphasizes his distance from other people.

Eisenstein wrote that he considered the main theme of Ivan the Terrible to be power. In his pursuit of power, Ivan gives up personal connections, and feels loneliness, because his love is not for other people, but for power. Eisenstein believed that adult cruelty was a defense mechanism developed in response to childhood fear, and that children will mimic those they fear to remove them, as Ivan does with the boyars. Due to his fear of vulnerability, gained from his traumatic childhood, he kills those closest to him; Eisenstein called these murders "decisive moments", as they show Ivan's true nature as a murderous ruler desperate to maintain his power. The film was intended to end with Ivan reaching the Baltic Sea, victorious but alone, having lost or destroyed all those close to him.

Neuberger wrote that throughout the film, Eisenstein characterizes Ivan as both a great leader and a tyrant, and questions whether the goals of national unification and imperial expansion justify his use of intimidation, demagoguery, deception and terror. She also wrote that by the end of the story, he has achieved complete power, at the price of individual isolation and tragedy, and left Russia in ruins. Daniil Lyakhovich asserted that the portrayal of tyrannical power in Ivan the Terrible is unusual in Soviet film because it criticizes tyranny as "glory, bought with blood".

== Release ==
=== Part I ===
Ivan the Terrible, Part I was screened for the Committee on Cinema Affairs in October 1944. Members of the committee were disappointed with the film, criticizing the characterization of Ivan, Malyuta Skuratov and the oprichniki. They demanded both the removal of the prologue of Ivan's childhood (part of which would be reinserted into Part II as flashbacks) and a scene with the oprichniki, and more emphasis on Ivan's accomplishments as tsar. Committee members such as Aleksei Dikiy, Igor Savchenko and Boris Gorbatov criticized Eisenstein's perceived failure to characterize Ivan as a powerful and accomplished leader. The acting quality and style was also criticized.

Part I was screened for Stalin in December 1944 and premiered in Moscow on 16 January 1945. (Note: Although Joan Neuberger gave 20 January as the premiere date in This Thing of Darkness: Eisenstein's Ivan the Terrible in Soviet Russia, she gave 16 January as the premiere date in Ivan the Terrible: The Film Companion. Maureen Perrie also gave 16 January as the premiere date, citing Rostislav Yurenev as her source.) The same year, it was nominated for the Stalin Prize. In spite of the objections of the members of the Stalin Prize committee, Stalin approved of Part I, and it ultimately received the prize on 27 January 1946. For their work on Part I, Eisenstein, Cherkasov, Prokofiev, Moskvin, Tisse and Birman were each awarded a Stalin Prize as well.

=== Part II ===
The second film, Ivan The Terrible, Part II: The Boyars' Plot (Note: Russian: Боярский заговор, romanized: Boyarskiy zagovor), was submitted for screening in February 1946. The film received heavy criticism from the Central Committee. Film historian Efim Levin wrote that this reaction was because the film was expected to "exonerate Ivan the Terrible, to show that the blood was not spilled in vain". Ivan Pyryev compared the depiction of Ivan to the Grand Inquisitor, stating that the portrayal of Ivan was completely unsympathetic and called the oprichniki "16th-century fascists". Film director Alexander Dovzhenko reportedly stated that "Such a film about such a Russia, the Kremlin — could serve as fantastic agitation against us."

In spite of this, Eisenstein insisted on screening Part II for Stalin, who called it a "nightmare". Stalin criticized Eisenstein's Ivan as being "a weak-willed Hamlet" and the oprichniki as being too similar to the Ku Klux Klan. Part II was then banned by the Central Committee on 5 March 1946. Eisenstein and Cherkasov met with Stalin on 25 February 1947 to discuss modifications to the film to lift the ban. At the meeting, Stalin criticized the film for not sufficiently showing the nationalist justifications behind Ivan's ruthlessness. Eisenstein did not work further on the film, despite receiving permission to revise Part II and continue work on Part III. A year later, Eisenstein died of a heart attack on the night of 10–11 February 1948.

On 6 May 1958, Mosfilm screened Part II for a group of historians who were asked whether it could be shown to Soviet viewers. The historians widely agreed that Part II was appropriate for viewing, as it "could not discredit [Soviet] art, ideology, or aims", and recommended its release to the Ministry of Culture. Part II was released in the USSR on 1 September 1958. In October, it received its world premiere at the 1958 Brussels World's Fair.

=== Other releases ===
Ivan the Terrible was released for DVD by the Criterion Collection alongside another Eisenstein film, Alexander Nevsky, in 2001. The release included two multimedia essays by Yuri Tsivian and Joan Neuberger, deleted scenes, sketches and storyboards.

Both parts of Ivan the Terrible were restored under the direction of Karen Shakhnazarov and presented at the 2015 Cannes Film Festival. In 2021, they were re-released for theaters in select Russian cities; in some theaters they were shown as a singular film, in other theaters only Part I was shown.

== Reception ==
The film has been polarizing amongst viewers. Reception was initially mixed; beginning in the 1970s, the film's reception began to change, and it has since been considered one of Eisenstein's best films.

=== Reception in the USSR ===
Part I received varying responses from audiences in the USSR upon release. The future sound engineer Boris Vengerovsky, who was 13 when the first part was released, recounted that when he attended a showing, the room was full at the beginning; by the end, only four people remained in the room. Contemporary accounts from other viewers also show dislike for the film. Future chess grandmaster Mikhail Botvinnik commented that the film was a "boring art gallery", and sculptor Vera Mukhina criticized the "lack of a great tragedy of the human character". One letter from a viewer, sent directly to Eisenstein, states that although the viewer enjoyed the plot, they found the film disappointing.

The film received some positive critical reviews. Critic Boris Romashov, writing for the newspaper Izvestiya, called Part I a "masterpiece of cinematographic art" and praised the acting, cinematography and set design. Critic Vsevolod Vishnevsky praised Part I in his 1945 review for the newspaper Pravda. Both Vishnevsky and Romashov praised the film for its presentation of Ivan as a leader beloved by the Russian people and Ivan's centralization of power and imperial expansion. Upon viewing Part II in 1947, Vishnevsky wrote an (unpublished) negative review, commenting that Eisenstein was "too Western". Alexander Dovzhenko also disliked Ivan, and considered Eisenstein to be "up to his neck...in Western aesthetics". Natalya Sokolova wrote for Iskusstvo Kino in 1958 upon the release of Part II that the film was the greatest work of each of its participants, in spite of its flaws, and praised Cherkasov's acting in particular.

=== Reception elsewhere ===
When Part I was first screened in France, the reception was negative among viewers, but positive among critics. French critic Jean de Baroncelli, upon viewing Part II in 1959, described the whole film as "a masterpiece, and the apotheosis of the cinematic genius of Eisenstein". In the United States, Part I was met coldly by critics, whereas Part II, upon release in 1958, was met with general acclaim.

Film critic Bosley Crowther, writing for The New York Times, called Part I a "work of art" and praised the visuals, camerawork, Prokofiev's score and Cherkasov's performance, while criticizing the lack of continuity in the film, and the "conspicuously totalitarian" depiction of Ivan. Crowther harshly criticized Part II, calling it a "pale extension" of Part I. Film critic Pauline Kael considered the film to be lacking in humanity; though she praised the beauty of the film, she considered the film itself to be static, grandiose and ludicrous.

Charlie Chaplin in 1946 called Part I "the greatest historic film that has ever been made". Russian-American director Michael Chekhov, a colleague of Eisenstein, considered Part I excellent from a director's point of view and an artistic point of view, but criticized the quality of the acting. Screenwriter Ben Maddow wrote in 1945 that Part I was "a film quite pure in style, hideous in its magnificence, and superhuman in its characters...Ivan is a great film, in motive and in plan; but it is not a good one."

=== Retrospective assessment and legacy ===
The film has been named twice in British film magazine Sight and Sound's decennial polls as among the greatest films of all time: once in 1962, ranking as the 6th greatest film of all time, tying with Eisenstein's own Battleship Potemkin (1925) and Bicycle Thieves (1948), and once in 1972, ranking as the 12th greatest film of all time, tying with The Gold Rush (1925), Hiroshima mon amour (1959), Ikiru (1952), Pierrot le Fou (1965) and Vertigo (1958). French film magazine Cahiers du Cinéma in 1959 named it the third-best film of all time, after Ugetsu (1953) and Hiroshima mon amour. It was also included among Harry Medved's 1978 The Fifty Worst Films of All Time.

Film theorist Leonid Kozlov in a review of Eisenstein's career in 1961 called it "the most complex and most masterful" of Eisenstein's films; American film critic Jonathan Rosenbaum in 1985 called it "one of the most distinctive great films in the history of cinema". Ivan the Terrible was awarded four out of four stars by American critic Roger Ebert and included on his list of "Great Movies" in 2012. Ebert praised the scope, visuals and Cherkasov's performance in Part I, while criticizing the story and Cherkasov's performance in Part II, and commented that "it is one of those works that has proceeded directly to the status of Great Movie without going through the intermediate stage of being a good movie." Russian film critic Anton Dolin has called Ivan the Terrible "the most important film of the 20th century" and described it as Eisenstein's masterpiece.

The directors Éric Rohmer, Slava Tsukerman, Werner Herzog, Manoel de Oliveira, Peter Greenaway, Volker Schlöndorff and Andrei Khrzhanovsky and the philosopher Slavoj Zizek expressed their admiration for Ivan the Terrible. (Note: Attributed to multiple sources:) Soviet director Andrei Tarkovsky watched the film "with rapt attention"; it is believed to have influenced his 1966 film Andrei Rublev. Several sequences from Aleksandr Askoldov's 1967 film Commissar also take inspiration from Ivan. Director Akira Kurosawa filmed his first color film, Dodes'ka-den (1970), after watching Ivan, and continued to make color films for the rest of his career. According to American film historian David Bordwell, Ivan the Terrible also exerted influence on the style of the films of Luchino Visconti, Derek Jarman and Ken Russell.

In November 2024, Russian film director Alexei German Jr. and producer Konstantin Ernst announced that a film about the making of Ivan the Terrible was in production. As of then, no actors have been cast.
