= Goritsky Monastery (Pereslavl-Zalessky) =

Russian orthodox monastery in Pereslavl-Zalessky, Russia

Coordinates: 56°43′14″N 38°49′26″E

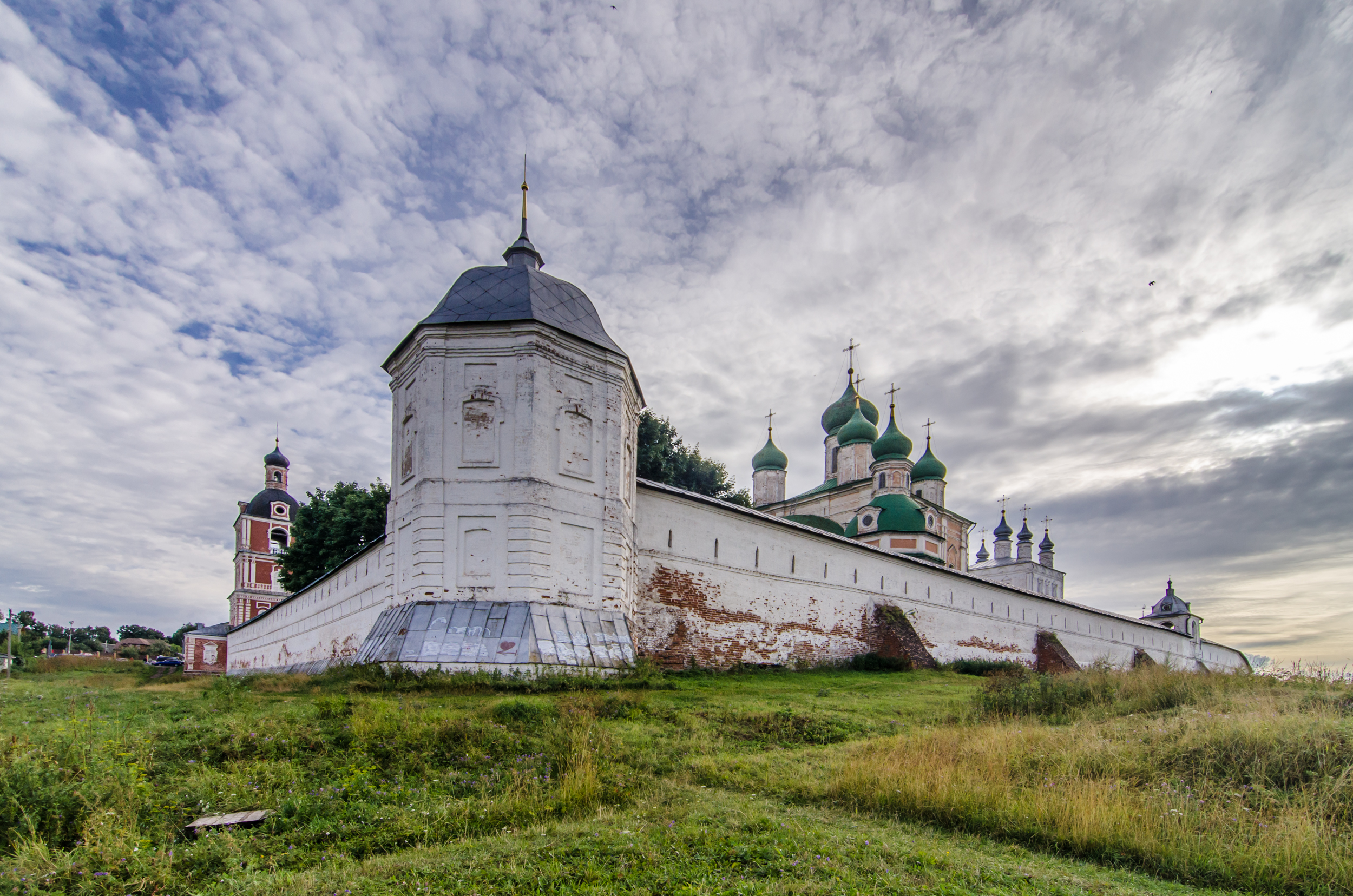
Goritsky Monastery

The Goritsky Monastery of Dormition (Russian: Успенский Горицкий монастырь) was a Russian Orthodox monastery in Pereslavl-Zalessky, Russia.

It was supposedly established in the early 14th century during the reign of Ivan I of Moscow (Ivan Kalita). In 1382 Tokhtamysh Khan destroyed the town and the monastery with it. According to the legend, Grand Princess Eudoxia of Moscow arrived as a pilgrim the day before the attack and managed to escape the Horde on a raft, covered by fog of the Pleshcheyevo lake. In gratitude for the miraculous salvation, she rebuilt the monastery and established a tradition of Easter rides on rafts across the lake.

All the monastery's manuscripts were destroyed by a fire on June 12, 1722, which is why little is known about its history.

No original architecture was preserved. The oldest parts of the preserved ensemble date to the 17-18th centuries.

The monastery was closed in 1788. In 1919 the Pereslavl-Zalessky Historical Museum was established within its territory.

== See also ==
- Goritsky Monastery (Goritsy)

== Sources ==
- Plishkin, P. (2004). Историческое, географическое, типографическое и политическое описание города Переславля-Залесского [History, Geography, Politics and Typology of Pereslavl-Zalessky] (PDF) (in Russian). Moscow: MelanarE.
- Kuksina, E. I. (2001). Славянская энциклопедия: А-М [The Slavic Encyclopaedia. Letters A-M]. Moscow: OLMA-Press. p. 387. ISBN 5-224-02249-5.
