= Mikhail Kuznetsov (actor) =

Soviet actor (1918–1986)

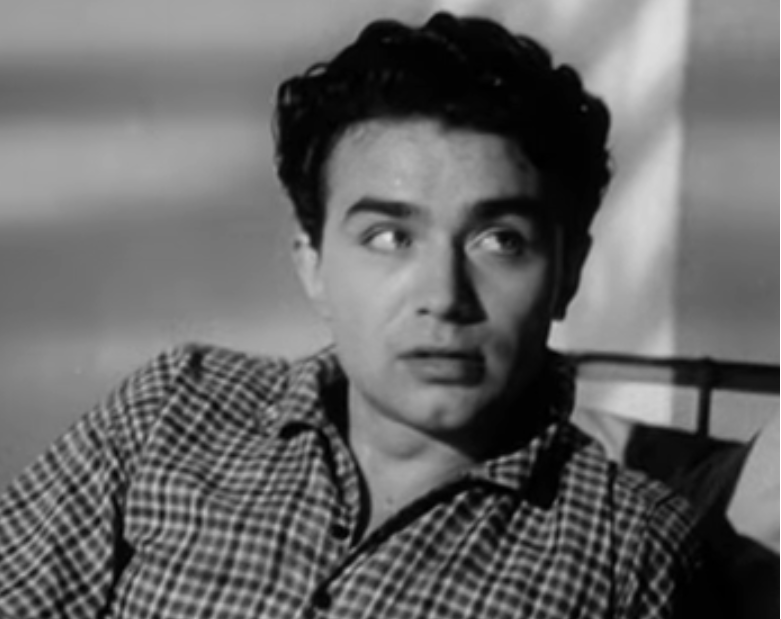
- Kuznetsov in Mashenka (1942)
- Born: Mikhail Artemyevich Kuznetsov; 25 February 1918; Bogorodsk, Moscow Governorate, Russian SFSR
- Died: 23 August 1986 (aged 68); Moscow, Russian SFSR, Soviet Union
- Occupation: Actor
- Years active: 1940–1986
- Spouse: Victoria Germanovna Kuznetsova (Germanova)

Mikhail Artemyevich Kuznetsov (Russian: Михаил Артемьевич Кузнецов; 25 February 1918 – 23 August 1986) was a Soviet film and theater actor. He was an Honored Artist of the Ukrainian SSR (1955), People's Artist of the RSFSR (1964), and the winner of the Stalin Prize of the first degree (1952).

He was born into a proletariat family. After the death of his father, he and his mother moved to the village of Tikhoretskaya. He first received small roles, working his way up to the role of Truffaldino. At some point, he and his mother moved to Moscow, and he completed his education in a professional technical school. He desired to study acting, but was not allowed to abandon work to try out for theater, so he burnt his hand with acid in order to be allowed to leave. He began to study at the Stanislavsky Opera and Drama Studio under Konstantin Stanislavsky in 1937. He was also talented at singing – opera singer Antonina Nezhdanova described him as having a "pleasant baritone".

His debut role was in Mikhail Gavronski's 1940 film The Friends (Russian: Приятели, romanized: Priyateli). After his role as Alexey Solovyov in Yuli Raizman's Mashenka, Kuznetsov began to be noticed by other directors. After being evacuated to Alma-Ata in the first years of World War II, Kuznetsov performed roles in several films, including Ivan Pyryev and Iosif Kheifits, the latter of which he would name "one of his directors", alongside Raizman. He was invited to play the role of Fyodor Basmanov in Sergei Eisenstein's Ivan the Terrible, which became possibly the most well-known role of his career.

He died near the Hotel Ukraina in Moscow. He is buried at the Vvedenskoye Cemetery.

His cousin was Anatoly Kuznetsov.

== Selected filmography ==
- 1940: The Friends as Ilya Korzun
- 1942: Mashenka as Solovyov
- 1943: Actress as Soldier on the concert (uncredited)
- 1943: The Aerial Cabman as Kolya
- 1945: Ivan the Terrible as Fyodor Basmanov
- 1945: It Happened in the Donbass as underground worker
- 1947: In the Name of Life as Doctor Aleksandr Kolesov
- 1948: Private Aleksandr Matrosov as Captain Kolosov
- 1951: Bountiful Summer as Pyotr Sereda
- 1951: Taras Shevchenko as soldier Skobelev
- 1953: Adventure in Odessa as Andrey Andreyevich Belov, uchitel geografii
- 1954: Marina's Destiny as Tarass Vassilievich
- 1954: Commander of the Ship as Captain Andrei Vysotin
- 1955: More studyonoye as Crewman Fedor Verigin
- 1955: Sailor Chizhik as Fedos Chyzhyk
- 1958: Ivan the Terrible, Part II as Fyodor Basmanov
- 1958: E.A. — Extraordinary Accident as Anton Semenovich Kovalenko
- 1959: The Magic Weaver as Old soldier
- 1964: The Blue Notebook as Vladimir Lenin
- 1965: The Salvos of the Aurora Cruiser as Lenin
- 1965: The Hyperboloid of Engineer Garin as Hlynov
- 1972: We and Our Mountains as Pavle (voice)
- 1978: Guarneri Quartet as Pyotr Grigoryevich Laktionov
- 1985: Bagration as Mikhail Kutuzov
- 1985: The Hobbit as Fili
