= Vladimir of Staritsa =

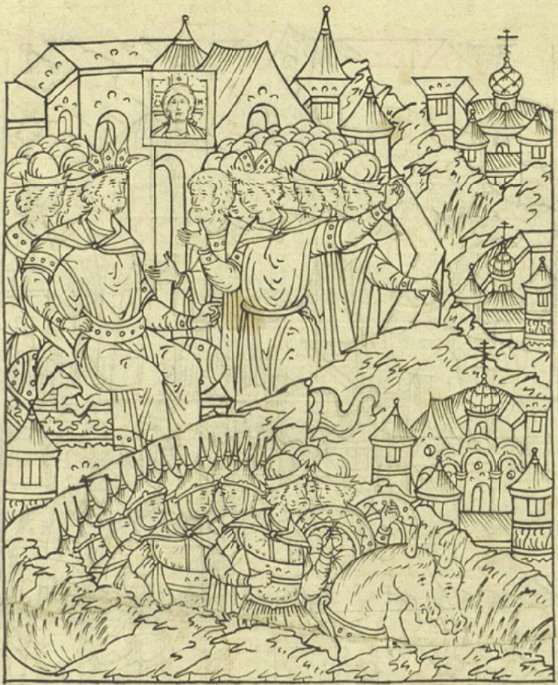
- Council of Vladimir and Ivan with the boyars on the capture of Kazan, miniature from the Illustrated Chronicle of Ivan the Terrible

Prince of Staritsa
- Reign: 1541–1566
- Monarch: Ivan IV

Prince of Dmitrov
- Reign: 1566–1569
- Monarch: Ivan IV
- Born: 9 July 1535; Moscow, Russia
- Died: 9 October 1569 (aged 34); Alexandrov, Russia
- Spouse: Eudoxia Andreyevna Nagaya; Eudoxia Romanovna Odoevskaya
- Issue: Maria Vladimirovna of Staritsa
- House: Rurik
- Father: Andrey of Staritsa
- Mother: Yefrosinya Staritskaya

Vladimir Andreyevich (Russian: Владимир Андреевич; 9 July 1535 – 9 October 1569) was the penultimate appanage Russian prince. His complicated relationship with his cousin, Ivan the Terrible, was dramatized in Sergei Eisenstein's 1945 film Ivan the Terrible.

== Life ==
The only son of Andrey of Staritsa and his wife Yefrosinya Staritskaya (née Khovanskaya), Vladimir spent his childhood under strict surveillance in Moscow.

In 1541, he was released along with his mother: "the grand prince Ivan Vasilyevich of all Russia granted at the intercession of his father Joasaphus, the metropolitan of all Russia, and his boyars, the prince Vladimir Andreyevich and his mother, the princess Yefrosinya, the wife of the prince Andrey Ivanovich, to be released from detention, and the prince Vladimir was ordered to be at his father's court, the prince Andrey Ivanovich, and with his mother". He was reinstated in his father's appanages, Staritsa and Vereya. There he married and lived in peace until 1553, when the tsar fell mortally ill.

During the final crisis of Ivan's illness, most boyars refused to swear fealty to his baby son and decided to put Vladimir on the throne instead. To their dismay, the tsar rapidly recovered, but a great change took place in his behaviour and manners. He summoned Vladimir to Moscow and signed with him a treaty whereby Vladimir was to live in Moscow with a small retinue and avoid contacts with Ivan's boyars. In the event of the tsar's death, Vladimir was to become regent for his minor son.

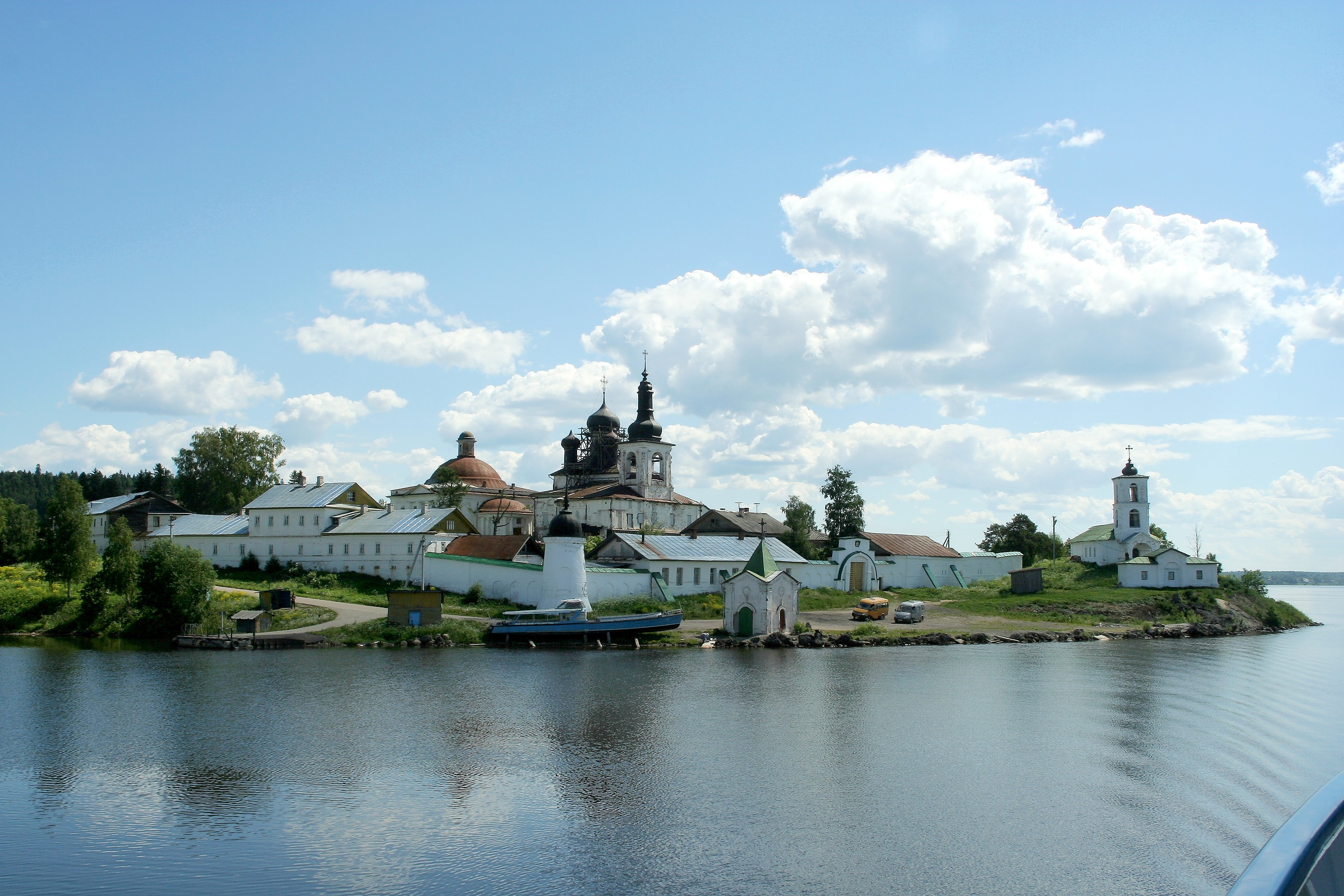
Goritsy Monastery near Vologda was built by Vladimir's family.

After Vladimir's mother was forced to take the veil and his boyars exiled, Ivan permitted Vladimir to marry Eudoxia Romanovna Odoevskaya in April 1555. With the start of oprichnina, however, Ivan's suspicions against his cousin were resuscitated. In 1564, the Oprichniki burnt Vladimir's palace in Moscow, and most of his lands were confiscated. In 1569, accused of high treason by Ivan, Vladimir and his children were forced to take poison at Ivan's residence in Alexandrov. His mother and wife, who resided at the Goritsy Convent near Vologda, were forcibly drowned in the Sheksna River several days later.

The extermination of Vladimir's family precipitated the extinction of the Muscovite branch of the Rurik dynasty and the dynastic crisis known as the Time of Troubles. Vladimir's only surviving daughter, Maria, was married in 1573 to Magnus of Livonia (son of Christian III of Denmark). Upon her husband's death, she was summoned from Courland to the court of Boris Godunov and forced to take the veil in a convent adjacent to the Troitse-Sergiyeva Lavra. In 1609, Maria entered into correspondence with her false cousin who had proclaimed himself tsar. Her subsequent fate is not documented.

== See also ==
- Family tree of Russian monarchs
