= Andrey of Staritsa =

Russian noble

Andrey Ivanovich
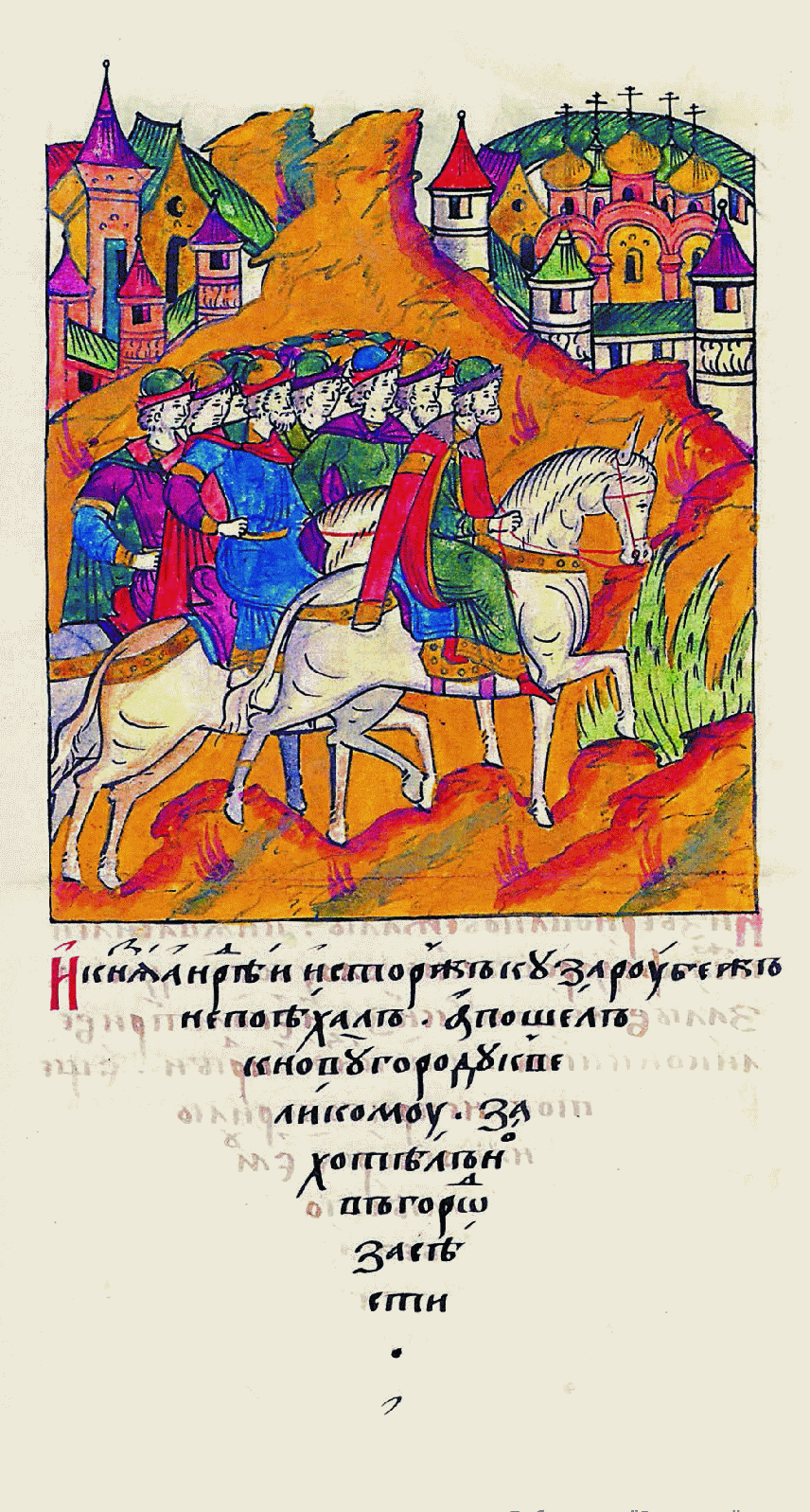
- Flight of Andrey to Novgorod, miniature from the Illustrated Chronicle of Ivan the Terrible
- Born: 5 August 1490; Moscow, Russia
- Died: 11 December 1537 (aged 47); Moscow, Russia
- Spouse: Yefrosinya Staritskaya
- Issue: Vladimir of Staritsa
- House: Rurik
- Father: Ivan III of Russia
- Mother: Sophia Palaiologina

Andrey Ivanovich (Russian: Андрей Иванович; 5 August 1490 – 11 December 1537) was the youngest son of Ivan III of Russia by his second wife Sophia Palaiologina. From 1519, his appanages included Volokolamsk and Staritsa.

== Life ==
When his elder brother Vasily III ascended the throne, Andrey was just 14. Like his other brothers, he was forbidden to marry until Vasily could produce an heir. This did not come to pass until 1530, but it was only two years later, when Vasily's second son was born, that Andrey was finally allowed to find himself a wife. Several months later, on 2 February 1533, he married a Gediminid princess, Yefrosinya Staritskaya, after having been given permission by Vasily to marry her. Their only child, Vladimir, was born later that year.

However, the next month, Vasily died. After 40 days of mourning, Andrey applied to his widow Elena Glinskaya for extension of his demesnes. Elena denied him that favour and Andrey departed for Staritsa in anger. There he heard that his only living brother, Yury Ivanovich, had been taken to prison and died there. It is only natural that he declined Elena's emphatic invitations to visit Moscow and lived in Staritsa in seclusion for three following years. He built there a fine cathedral, which still stands.

In 1537, however, it was rumoured that Andrey was going to escape to the Grand Duchy of Lithuania. Upon hearing the news, Elena closed the Lithuanian border and dispatched her minion, Prince Obolensky, to seize him. Andrey escaped to Novgorod, where he persuaded local nobility to join his cause. Reluctant to appeal to arms, however, he surrendered to the mercy of Obolensky. At Moscow, he was tried and thrown into prison with all his family. He died several months later and was succeeded in Staritsa by his son Vladimir.

== Bibliography ==
"Андрей Иванович, князь старицкий" . Brockhaus and Efron Encyclopedic Dictionary (in Russian). 1906.
