= Goritsy, Suzdalsky District, Vladimir Oblast =

Goritsy Горицы
- Selo
- Location within Vladimir Oblast Location within Russia
- Coordinates: 56°13′N 40°20′E
- Country: Russia
- Region: Vladimir Oblast
- District: Suzdalsky District
- Time zone: UTC+3:00

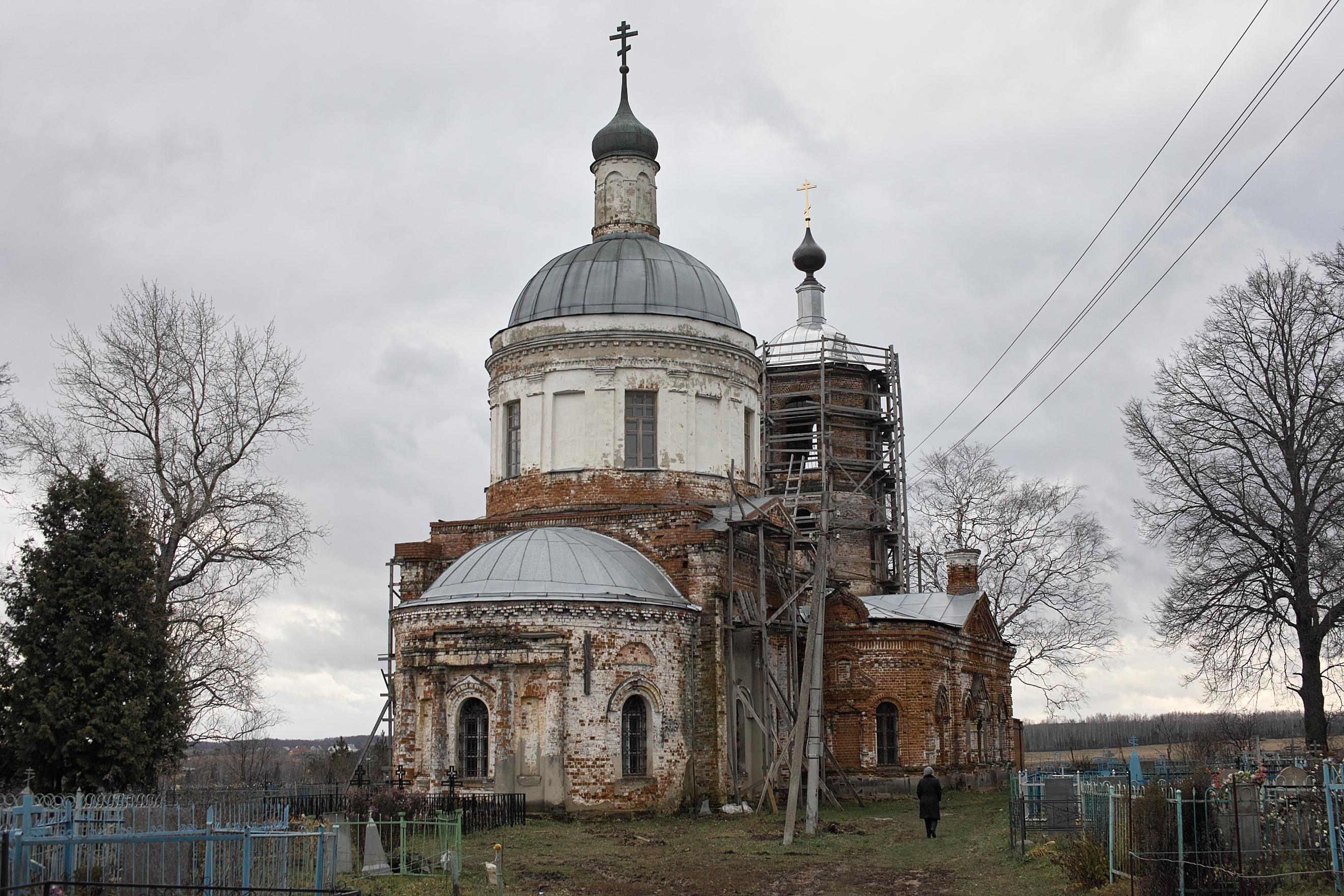
The Church of the Transfiguration in Goritsy

Goritsy (Russian: Горицы) is a rural locality (a selo) in Novoalexandrovskoye Rural Settlement, Suzdalsky District, Vladimir Oblast, Russia. The population was 10 as of 2010. There are 9 streets.

== Geography ==
Goritsy is located 44 km south of Suzdal (the district's administrative centre) by road. Zeleni is the nearest rural locality.
