= Goritsky Monastery (Goritsy) =

Russian Orthodox convent in Goritsy, Kirillovsky District, Russia

Coordinates: 59°51′51″N 38°15′31″E

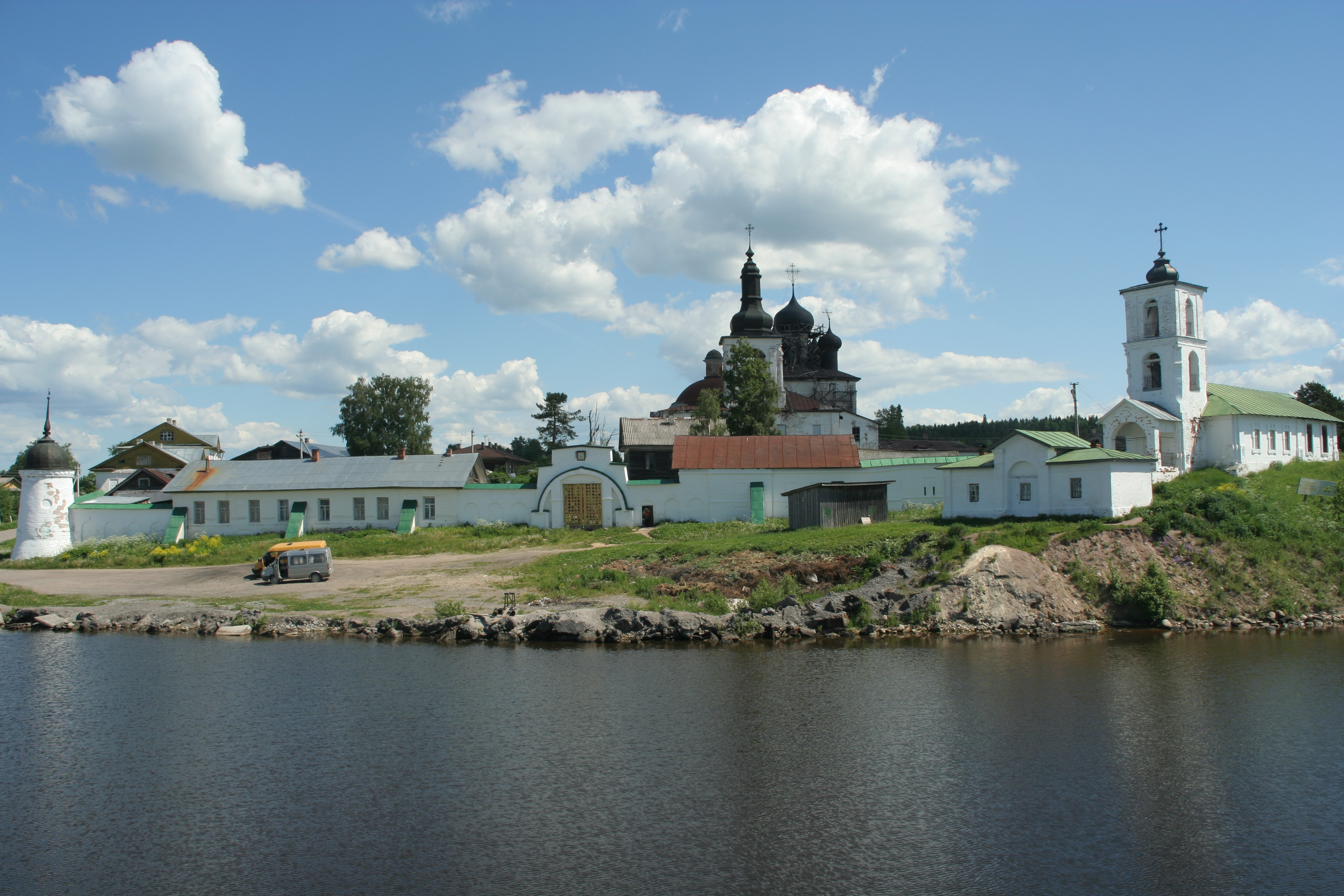
Goritsky Monastery

The Goritsy Monastery of Resurrection (Russian: Воскресенский Горицкий монастырь) is a Russian Orthodox convent (female monastery) in the village of Goritsy, Kirillovsky District, Vologda Oblast, Russia. The convent is 15 kilometres (9.3 mi) north of the town of Kirillov, Kirillovsky District, which was the site of one of the historically most important (as well as wealthiest) male monasteries in Russia, and to which Tsar Ivan the Terrible, discussed below, had planned to retire. Since the 1970s, the Kirillo-Belozerksy museum zapovednik of History, Art, and Architecture has operated parts of the Goritsky complex. Parts of Goritsky convent were reopened for religious purposes two decades later, and as of 2011 Goritsky was one of the four acting monasteries in Vologda Oblast, and the only one for religious women.

== History ==
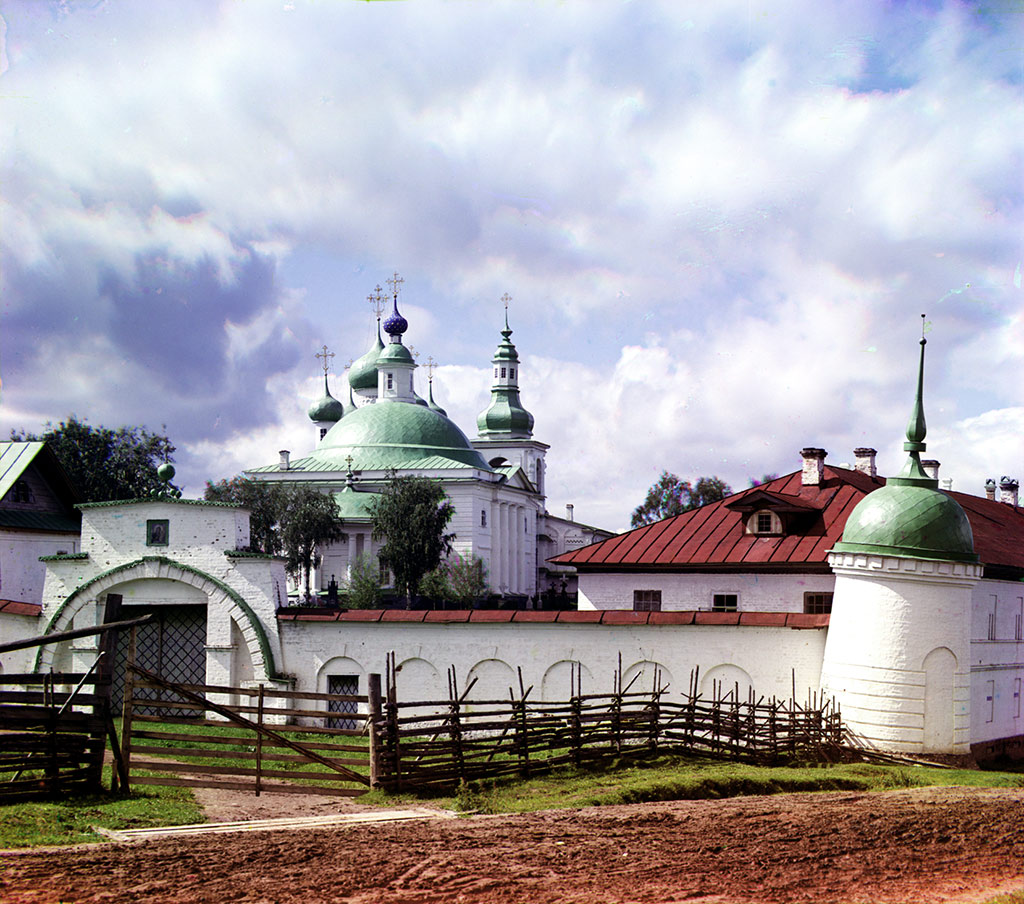
The monastery in July 1909, photo taken by Sergey Prokudin-Gorsky

The Gediminid knyaginya (duchess) Yefrosinya Staritskaya founded the Goritsky convent in 1544, about a decade after her marriage to one of Tsar Ivan the Great's sons (who died imprisoned after a succession rebellion in his name), and two years after the marriage of her only son, Vladimir of Staritsa. In 1563, as the Livonian war with Lithuania, Poland and Sweden led to the oprichnina, the aristocratic widow was forced to become a nun and kept under house arrest at Goritsky, together with her daughter-in-law, Yevdokiya Staritskaya. Nonetheless, in 1569, the Russian tsar Ivan the Terrible gave orders to drown the two nuns in the nearby Sheksna River. The policy of removing political opponents to religious foundations, common throughout Europe for decades, continued to use the Goritsky convent. In 1586 Anna Koltovskaya, Ivan the Terrible's fourth wife, might also have taken monastic vows and changed her name to Daria at Goritsky, before being transferred to the Vvedensky convent in Tikhvin. Xenia Godunova, the daughter of Tsar Boris Godunov, became the nun Olga at Goritsky circa 1606, before being transferred to the Knyaginin Convent in Vladimir and later burial with her royal family at the Trinity Lavra of St. Sergius.

The convent's most recent famous resident may have been Fool for Christ Asenatha of Goritsky, who died in 1892 (and whom Russian Orthodox faithful continue to remember on April 19).

In the 1920s, the Bolsheviks transformed the convent into an agricultural cooperative where the nuns worked and prayed. In the 1930s it was shut down, and most of the nuns executed. In the 1950s it housed disabled veterans. In the 1970s it became part of Kirillo-Belozersky museum-zapovednik of History, Art, and Architecture (based on the Kirillo-Belozersky Monastery). Since the 1990s a small community of nuns started to live in the convent.
