= Goritsy, Selivanovsky District, Vladimir Oblast =

Goritsy Горицы
- Village
- Location within Vladimir Oblast Location within Russia
- Coordinates: 55°59′N 41°53′E
- Country: Russia
- Region: Vladimir Oblast
- District: Selivanovsky District
- Time zone: UTC+3:00

Goritsy (Russian: Горицы) is a rural locality (a village) in Chertkovskoye Rural Settlement, Selivanovsky District, Vladimir Oblast, Russia. The population was 47 as of 2010. There are 2 streets.

== Geography ==
Goritsy is located on the Tetrukh River, 26 km northeast of Krasnaya Gorbatka (the district's administrative centre) by road. Mokrovo is the nearest rural locality.
