= Tsar (film) =

2009 film

- Film poster
- Directed by: Pavel Lungin
- Written by: Alexey Ivanov
- Produced by: Pavel Lungin; Olga Vasilieva
- Starring: Pyotr Mamonov; Oleg Yankovsky
- Edited by: Albina Antipenko
- Release date: May 2009
- Running time: 116 minutes
- Country: Russia
- Language: Russian

Tsar (Russian: Царь) is a 2009 Russian historical drama film directed by Pavel Lungin. It competed in the Un Certain Regard section at the 2009 Cannes Film Festival.

== Plot ==
The film is set between 1566 and 1569 during the era of the Oprichnina and the Livonian War. The film starts from the time when the Russian Orthodox Metropolitan Afanasii has died and Tsar Ivan IV has summoned his childhood friend, Hegumen Philip Kolychev of Solovetsky Monastery. The film is divided into four parts.

=== The Prayer of the Tsar ===
The Tsar prays in his cell and asks the Lord to help him in his business. Meanwhile, Hegumen Philip arrives in Moscow, and on the way rescues a girl, Masha, who is fleeing from a group of guardsmen. Receiving the Hegumen when he arrives, the Tsar invites him to become Metropolitan of Moscow, but Philip initially declines. The Hegumen meets his nephew, who is leaving for war and urges the Hegumen to flee from the Tsar, as those around him cannot survive. The Tsar returns to Philip, gives Masha an icon of the Mother of God, and persuades Hegumen Philip to become Metropolitan. Philip, witnessing the horrors being committed by the Oprichniki, urges the Tsar to show mercy to his enemies.

=== The Tsar at War ===
Metropolitan Philip's nephew fights in a bloody battle against the Poles and Lithuanians at Polotsk. There is also Masha, who has escaped from the Tsar and brought the icon. Thanks to the icon, the bridge collapses under the Lithuanian cavalry. The governor of Polotsk returns to Moscow, but news arrives that the Lithuanian and Polish forces went around to the rear of the city and that the governor himself surrendered the town. The enraged Tsar desires to execute all the governor's men. Metropolitan Philip defends them, which also triggers the wrath of the Tsar. The governor is arrested, and Malyuta Skuratov brands his chest.

=== The Tsar's Wrath ===
The Tsar orders Metropolitan Philip to judge the governor and the court convicts the governor's men of treason. Realizing that the defendants have been tortured into confessing, Metropolitan Philip refuses to sign the death warrant. Meanwhile, the Tsar prepares their execution: he pits them one on one against a bear. After killing two commanders, the bear attacks Philip's nephew. At this point, Masha runs into the arena with the icon and tries to stop the bear but is killed herself. Metropolitan Philip, horrified by the senseless brutality of the Tsar and seeing the futility of his attempts to persuade the Tsar to give up violence, enters the arena and picks up the icon. During a service at the Church, he refuses to bless the Tsar, who furiously strips the Metropolitan of his rank and forces him to watch the execution of his nephew on the rack. The Tsar decides to pardon Philip himself, but forever exiles him to a monastery, where he is treated as an ordinary prisoner, shackled and even deprived of water.

=== The Tsar's Fun ===
Heinrich von Staden builds a "torture camp", which is planned to convene the people to festivals and watch the torture of prisoners. During the inspection, the Tsar's jester Vassian quotes the Book of Revelation, comparing the Tsar's wife Maria Temryukovna with the Whore of Babylon, for which the Tsar burns him at the stake. Meanwhile, in the monastery, Philip's chains are supernaturally loosened, and he receives the gift of healing and foresight. He warns Archbishop Pimen that they will be blamed for his death. Philip encourages them to run and save themselves. However, the abbot, and almost all the monks stay with him. The Tsar arrives, but Philip again accuses him of horrific violence and refuses him a blessing. On the orders of the Tsar, Skuratov strangles Philip with his own hands. Despite the order to hand over Philip's corpse, the monks bury Philip in a wooden church and lock it; Skuratov's guardsmen burn the church with the monks inside.

Final Scene: The Tsar waits for the beginning of his tortures. Despite the order to assemble, no one does. "Where are my people?" - asks the Tsar. Then, he prays the Jesus Prayer then again asks: "Where are my people?"

== Cast ==
- Pyotr Mamonov as Ivan The Terrible
- Oleg Yankovskiy as Metropolitan Philip Kolychev
- Anastasiya Dontsova as Masha
- Aleksandr Domogarov as Alexei Basmanov
- Aleksandr Ilyin as Fedka Basmanov
- Ramilya Iskander as Maria Temryukovna
- Ville Haapasalo as Heinrich von Staden
- Aleksei Frandetti as Kai-Bulat
- Ivan Okhlobystin as Vassian
- Yuri Kuznetsov as Malyuta Skuratov
- Aleksei Makarov as General Kolychev
