= Goritsy, Pogarsky District, Bryansk Oblast =

Goritsy Горицы
- Village
- Location within Bryansk Oblast Location within Russia
- Coordinates: 52°23′N 33°18′E
- Country: Russia
- Region: Bryansk Oblast
- District: Pogarsky District
- Time zone: UTC+3:00

Goritsy (Russian: Горицы) is a rural locality (a village) in Pogarsky District, Bryansk Oblast, Russia. The population was 59 as of 2013. There are 3 streets.

== Geography ==
Goritsy is located 25 km south of Pogar (the district's administrative centre) by road. Chausy is the nearest rural locality.
