= Goritsy, Gryazovetsky District, Vologda Oblast =

Goritsy Горицы
- Village
- Location within Vologda Oblast Location within Russia
- Coordinates: 58°44′N 40°59′E
- Country: Russia
- Region: Vologda Oblast
- District: Gryazovetsky District
- Time zone: UTC+3:00

Goritsy (Russian: Горицы) is a rural locality (a village) in Sidorovskoye Rural Settlement, Gryazovetsky District, Vologda Oblast, Russia. The population was 6 as of 2002.

== Geography ==
Goritsy is located 53 km (33 mi) southeast of Gryazovets (the district's administrative centre) by road. Ivonino is the nearest rural locality.
