= Yefrosinya Staritskaya =

Russian noblewoman (1516–1569)

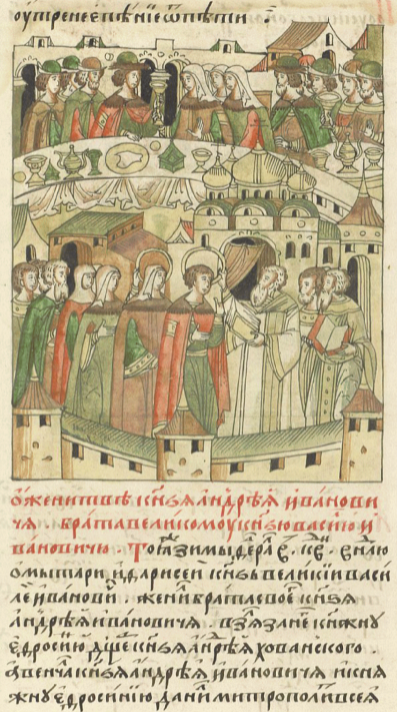
- Marriage of Andrey of Staritsa to Yefrosinya Khovanskaya, miniature from the Illustrated Chronicle of Ivan the Terrible
- Born: 1516
- Died: 20 October 1569 (aged 52–53)
- Burial: Goritsky Monastery
- Spouse: Andrey of Staritsa
- Issue: Vladimir of Staritsa
- Father: Andrey Fedorovich Khovansky

Yefrosinya (Note: Also spelled as Evfrosinia or Eufrosinia.) Andreyevna Staritskaya (Russian: Ефросинья Андреевна Старицкая; née Khovanskaya; 1516 – 20 October 1569) was a Russian noblewoman. She was married to Andrey of Staritsa, the younger brother of Vasili III and an uncle of Ivan IV.

== Life ==
In 1533, she married Andrey of Staritsa, the younger brother of Vasili III, who gave permission for them to marry. She was described as ambitious and forceful. She wished for the Staritsky family to influence the regency of Ivan IV, and orchestrated a plot to depose the regent Elena Glinskaya, Ivan's mother. She failed, and was imprisoned along with her son Vladimir and her spouse, who died in prison.

In 1541, she was released along with her son Vladimir who was returned his inheritance: "the grand prince Ivan Vasilyevich of all Russia granted at the intercession of his father Joasaphus, the metropolitan of all Russia, and his boyars, the prince Vladimir Andreyevich and his mother, the princess Yefrosinya, the wife of the prince Andrey Ivanovich, to be released from detention, and the prince Vladimir was ordered to be at his father's court, the prince Andrey Ivanovich, and with his mother".

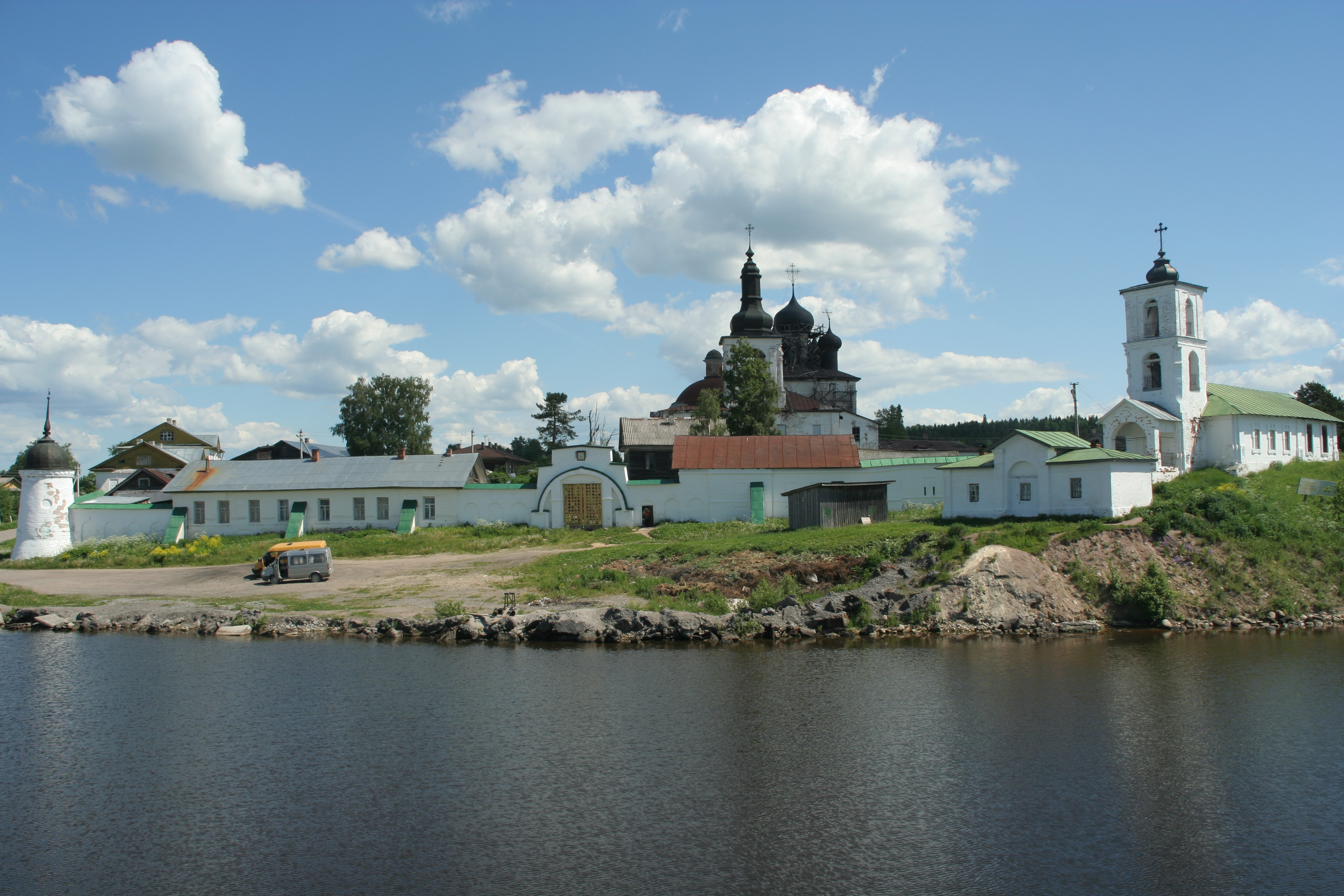
Goritsy Monastery near Vologda was founded by Yefrosinya.

After the death of regent Elena, Yefrosinya returned to court with her son and successfully influenced the tsar to return the confiscated lands of her spouse. In 1550, she arranged for her son to marry Evdokia Nagaya, and allied with the Belsky court faction in order to place her son Vladimir on the throne. She created alliances with boyar families by including them in her household in her principality of Staritsa, and equipped the principality with her own army. During the illness of Ivan IV in 1553, she actively pressed the claims of her son to the throne. However, her plot failed as she did not managed to secure support in the boyar duma, nor the full cooperation of her son. In response, she herself kept the seal and control of the family principality and refused to give it to her son even as he was no longer a minor. When recovered, Ivan IV himself had Vladimir include a promise in his oath not to protect his mother if she was to "plan harm" against him again.

During the Livonian War, Vladmir was honored for his conduct in battle and won popularity, which made the tsar fear that Yefrosinya would use her son's popularity against him. In 1563, Yefrosinya was arrested and put on trial for alleged conspiracy and sentenced to live in a convent. She was however allowed to keep her own household in the convent, allowed to make pilgrimage journeys and kept informed of political affairs, and thus the verdict had limited actual effect on her activity. In 1569, Ivan IV again suspected Vladimir to be the object of plots to place him on the throne, orchestrated by his mother: he gave orders that she be executed, which was performed.

== See also ==
- Family tree of Russian monarchs
