= Heinrich von Staden (author) =

German diplomat and author

Heinrich von Staden (1542–?) was a self-proclaimed "adventurer in Muscovy" who wrote an account of his time at the court of Ivan the Terrible from 1578 to 1582.

== Early life ==
Staden was born the son of a burgher in Ahlen, near Münster, Germany. His mother, Kattarina Ossenbach, died in the plague, and he had a brother, Bernhardus von Staden, a Roman Catholic priest in Ahlen, and a sister. When attending a Catholic seminary in Ahlen, Staden was accused of stabbing a fellow seminarian with an awl. His cousin, Steffan Hovener, invited him to live in Livonia with him, where "he would not be disturbed." In Livonia, he worked on building the city walls, but didn't like the labor and ran away to the Wolgarten estate in Wolmar. There, the wife of Wolgarten entrusted him with her estates when she learned he could read and write in Latin and German, and was learning Latvian.

After Wolgarten remarried and moved away, Staden also moved, to Karkus, and became a merchant. After trouble erupted in the Livonian government, Staden sent a letter to his friend, Joachim Schroter at the border town of Dorpat, which was held by the Russians. He wrote that he would serve the Tsar Ivan IV if he were paid. He was invited to Moscow, where he met the Tsar. Ivan was impressed with Staden and invited him to dinner; soon after, he became a member of the Tsar's political police, or Oprichnina.

== Living in Russia ==
Staden's account of Russia, The Land and Government of Muscovy, was addressed to the Holy Roman Emperor, Rudolf II. It consists of four parts: a petition, a description of Russia, a plan for the invasion of Russia from the north, and the author's autobiography. Staden hoped to influence the emperor to invade Muscovite Russia, restore the region to the Teutonic Order, and be rewarded. Seemingly, after 1578 he worked for George John I, Count Palatine of Veldenz, and was involved in Swedish affairs. Between 1578 and 1582, Staden worked as a sort of spy for the Teutonic Order. He sent his proposal to the Order's Grand Master and later to the kings of Poland and Sweden.

Historians discovered this document in 1839 in the Prussian state archives, but no link to Staden was discovered until a few years later. His accounts are the most insightful and descriptive of the day and display the disorder of the Russian government under Ivan the Terrible. Heinrich von Staden calls Tsar Ivan a "horrid tyrant" but wrote more neutrally than his contemporaries. His narratives of the Oprichnina are the only ones written by a member, and the history of the Oprichnina was rewritten after Staden's accounts were found. He describes the targets of Ivan's terror as individual families which the Tsar believed to be dangerous to his authority, rather than against the entire boyar class as previously thought.

== Controversy ==
Some historians question the authenticity of Staden's claims. Academician S. B. Veselovsky was very critical of the Notes on Muscovy. The historian D. N. Alshits, comparing Staden's text with the historical realities of the epoch and with the newly discovered documents, came to the conclusion that Staden was not in Oprichnina at all, but only pretended to be oprichnik in order to raise his status in the eyes of Emperor Rudolph, his patron and addressee of notes on Muscovy. According to Alshits, many of Staden's reports on Ivan the Terrible's Russian resemble the stories of Baron Munchausen's Narrative of his Marvellous Travels and Campaigns in Russia.

== Appearances in modern media ==
- Ivan the Terrible, the role of Heinrich von Staden is played by Oleg Zhakov.
- In Pavel Lungin's 2009 film Tsar, Heinrich von Staden is portrayed by Finnish actor Ville Haapasalo.
