= Mashenka (1942 film) =

- Directed by: Yuli Raizman
- Written by: Yevgeny Gabrilovich; Sergei Yermolinsky
- Starring: Valentina Karavayeva; Mikhail Kuznetsov
- Cinematography: Yevgeniy Nikolayevich Andrikanis; Galina Pyshkova
- Edited by: Yevgeniya Abdirkina
- Music by: Boris Volsky
- Production company: Mosfilm
- Release date: 10 April 1942
- Running time: 77 minutes
- Country: Soviet Union
- Language: Russian

Mashenka (Russian: Машенька) is a 1942 Soviet war romance film directed by Yuli Raizman and starring Valentina Karavayeva and Mikhail Kuznetsov.

== Plot ==
Telegraphist Masha Stepanova (Valentina Karavayeva) is a medical orderly. During a fire drill, she meets the taxi driver Alexei Soloviev (Mikhail Kuznetsov). Masha falls in love with Alexei and takes care of him while he is sick. He mentions how he lied about being in college and actually dropped out due to money shortages. When he comes to health, she overhears him talking to his uncle, stating that she is a 'good friend' despite her taking off work and selling her belongings for him.

Despite this, she still hangs out with him, in love but also keeping distance. Alexei also decides to go back to college and study with Masha. When he finds out she sold her belongings for him, he repays her and states he is going away to a resort to work as a taxi driver to make more money. Masha follows him and they talk more, where he eventually leans in for a kiss and she refuses, saying he doesn't love her. They agree to wait, and not everything works out in their relationship.

After a college semester, they meet up at a party with friends. Due to Alexei getting infatuated with another girl, Masha leaves abruptly and cuts off all contact with her friends and Alexei. War breaks out, and Masha is a combat nurse and Alexei is in the 14th Tank Division. They meet up briefly, and Alexei leaves a note for her (which is missed and read by other soldiers). The message eventually gets to her, and Alexei by this point has switched to the infantry and participates in an offensive on a town. They eventually happen to meet again later during the Winter War for a few minutes, and it seems that everything is still ahead for them.

== Cast ==
- Valentina Karavayeva – Mashenka Stepanova
- Mikhail Kuznetsov – Alexei "Alyosha" Soloviev
- D. Pankratova – Klava
- Vera Altayskaya – Vera
- Georgi Svetlani – Uncle Vasya
- Nikolai Gritsenko – Kolya (uncredited)
- Vladislav Strzhelchik – White Finnish officer (uncredited)
- Aleksey Konsovsky – Muryaga, a young taxi driver (uncredited)
- Yevgeny Samoylov – episode (uncredited)

== Awards ==
- 1943 - Stalin Prize of Second Degree (Yuli Raizman, Yevgeny Gabrilovich, Valentina Karavayeva).
