= Godunov (TV series) =

Russian TV series

- Genre: Historical drama
- Created by: Nikolay Borisov; Ilya Tilkin; Yekaterina Jukova
- Based on: Godunov by K. Badigin
- Directed by: Alexey Andrianov (Seas 1); Timur Alpatov (Season 2)
- Starring: Sergey Bezrukov; Svetlana Khodchenkova; Andrey Merzlikin; Anna Mikhalkova
- Composer: Artem Vasilyev
- Country of origin: Russia
- Original language: Russian
- No. of seasons: 2
- No. of episodes: 17 (8+9)

Production
- Producer: Glavkino
- Production location: Russia
- Cinematography: Sergey Machilsky, Maxim Shinkorenko
- Editor: Igor Litoninsky
- Running time: 42-52 minutes
- Production companies: Mosfilm; Moskino; Look Film

Original release
- Network: Rossiya 1
- Release: November 5, 2018 – March 29, 2019

Godunov (Russian: Годуно́в) is a Russian historical drama television series created by Ilya Tikin and Nikolay Borisov, directed by Alexei Andrianov and Timur Alpatov. The first season premiered from November 5 to November 8, 2018, on the "Russia-1" national TV channel. The second season premiered from March 25 to March 29, 2019.

The series tells the story of historical events covering the years 1580 to 1613, from the late reign of Ivan the Terrible (1530–1584), the first Tsar of all Rus', until the ascension to the Russian throne of Mikhail I Romanov (1598–1645). It centers upon the fate of the Godunov family: Tsar Boris Godunov (1551–1605), his wife Maria Skuratova-Belskaya, his sister Irina Godunova, his son Fyodor II of Russia and his daughter Tsarevna Xenia Borisovna.

The creators based themselves upon the novel-chronicle "Shipwreck near the Island of Hope" (1978, not translated) by historical novelist Konstantin Badygin. The novel tells the story of Boris Godunov's rise to power and the struggle of the powerful Stroganov family with the background of English merchants trying to establish privileged trade relations. The authors slightly changed the storylines, simplifying them and replacing some of the characters. Nonetheless, most of the characters are strictly historical. The score was written and orchestrated by renowned Kazakh composer Artem Vasilyev

The series is currently available on Region 1 DVD (in Russian with English subtitles) and on Amazon's Prime Video.

== Plot ==
Russia, around the year 1600: The mysterious death of the rightful heir Dmitry of Uglich ends the rule of the Rurik dynasty, leading to a power struggle. The ambiguous Tsar Boris Godunov's rise to power meets with deceitful conspiracies by the Russian aristocrats, the "Boyars"; the destruction of his whole family and the troubled years that follow are unveiled in this major saga, featuring excellent period reconstructions, accurate historicity, costumes, and top-notch acting.

Season One covers the historical period from the last years of Tsar Ivan the Terrible's reign until the coronation of Boris Godunov in 1598. Season Two's first four episodes cover the 7-year long reign of Tsar Boris, marked by a two-year famine and the enmity of the Boyars who disliked the Tsar because "he wasn't one of them" whilst he sought to curb their power. After Tsar Boris's death in 1605, eight more years of troubles follow, that will witness five successive rulers, including two impostors, seizing power. The series ends with the successful resistance of the Trinity Lavra of St. Sergius monastery withstanding a celebrated 16-month Polish-Lithuanian historical siege.

== Cast ==
Season One

- Sergey Bezrukov as Boris Godunov, oprichnik, Boyar, then Tsar of all Russia in 1598
- Svetlana Khodchenkova as Maria Skuratova-Belskaya, Tsarina, wife of Godunov, daughter of Malyuta Skuratov
- Sergei Makovetsky as Ivan IV the Terrible, Tsar of all Russia
- Viktor Sukhorukov as Malyuta Skuratov
- Aleksandr Ustyugov as Fyodor Nikitich Romanov, Patriarch Filaret of Moscow
- Maria Andreyeva as Xenia Shestova, wife of Fyodor Romanov (Patriarch Filaret), mother of Mikhail of Russia
- Andrey Merzlikin as Prince Vasily Shuyski, later Vasily IV, tsar of all Russia (1606–1610)
- Fyodor Lavrov as Feodor I of Russia, Tsar of all Russia (1576–1584), third son of Ivan the Terrible
- Anna Mikhalkova as Tsarina Irina Godunova, sister of Boris Godunov, wife of Tsar Feodor I
- Vladimir Steklov as Andrey Shchelkalov
- Irina Pegova as Maria Nagaya, Tsarina, seventh wife of Ivan the Terrible, mother of Dmitry
- Klim Berdinsky as Prince Dmitry of Uglich, last son of Ivan the Terrible with Maria Nagaya (1582-1591?)
- Anton Kuznetsov as Bogdan Belsky, statesman, nephew of Malyuta Skuratov
- Anna Kovalchuk as Princess Maria Vladimirovna of Staritsa
- Yevgeny Tsyganov as Tsarevich Ivan Ivanovich of Russia, second son of Ivan the Terrible (1530–1584)
- Kristina Brodskaya as Tsesarevna Yelena Sheremeteva, wife of Ivan Ivanovich
- Alexander Gorbatov as Prince Fedor Mstislavsky
- Alexander Ilyin as Prince Ivan Mstislavsky
- Yury Belyayev as Prince Ivan Shuysky, uncle of Vasily Shuyski
- Nikolay Schrayber as Prince Dmitry Shuyski, brother of Vasily Shuyski
- Polina Dudkina as Princess Ekaterina Shuyskaya, wife of Dmitry Shuyski, daughter of Malyuta Skuratov
- Albert Kobrowski as "The Rider"
- Lev Prygunov as Boyar Nikita Romanovich Zakharin-Yuryev, father of Fyodor Romanov, uncle of Tsar Fedor Ivanovich
- Alexander Pashutin as Boyar Feodor Nagoy, father of the tsaritsa Maria Nagaya, uncle of Prince Dmitry Ivanovich
- Artyom Alekseev as Stepan Godunov, Tsar Boris's devout and devious aide-de-camp
- Alexander Semchev as Peter Golovin, Treasurer
- Sergei Nikonenko as Nikita Stroganov
- Boris Klyuyev as Dionysius, Metropolitan of Moscow and All Russia
- Boris Plotnikov as Patriarch Job of Moscow
- Sergey Gazarov as Patriarch Jeremias II of Constantinople
- Yuri Kolokolnikov as Jerome Horsey, English merchant
- Lymutis Sedjus as Sir Jerome Bowes, English Ambassador to Russia
- Sergey Borisov as Fedor Kon, architect
- Oleg Vasilkov as Mikhail Bityagovsky
- Nina Dvorzhetskaya as Vasilisa Volokhova, Prince Dmitry's nanny
- Sergey Barkovsky as Lev Sapega, Lithuanian Commander
- Seydullah Moldakhanov as Ğazi II Giray, khan of the Crimean Khanate
- Albinas Kelaris as Johann Eilof, Dutch healer
- Len Blavatnik as Cardinal Jerzy Radziwiłł (1556–1600)
- Nikolai Denisov as Tishka, servant of Fyodor Romanov
- Andrius Paulavicius as Anton Marsh, English merchant
- Remigijus Sabulis as John Brown, English merchant
- Vaidotas Martinaitis as Richard Ingram, English merchant
- Leonid Timtsunik as Trifon Patrikeyev
- Igor Sigov as commandant of the castle in Riga
- Sergey Serov as Semyon Duda, Governor
- Yulia Galkina as Praskovya Sicheva
- Ivan Mokhovikov as Istoma Sovin, an archer
- Piotr Logachev as Ondryushka Mochalov of Uglich
- Pavel Srebor as Semion Saburov, Governor
- Vilen Babichev as Archip, the executioner

Season Two

- Sergey Bezrukov as Boris Godunov, Tsar of all Russia
- Svetlana Khodchenkova as Tsarina Maria Skuratova-Belskaya, Godunov's wife
- Darya Ursulyak as Tsarevna Xenia Borisovna Godunova, Boris's daughter
- Ilya Ilinikh as Tsarevich Feodor II of Russia, Boris's son and short-lived Tsar (April–June 1605)
- Evgeniy Tkachuk as False Dmitry I (aka the Monk Grigory Otrepiev), impostor, Tsar of all Russia (1605–1606)
- Olga Kalitska as Marina Mniszech, Tsarina, wife of False Dmitry I
- Miroslav Enkot as Jerzy Mniszech, Polish nobleman and diplomat, father of Marina Mniszech
- Tamara Spirichova as the old mother of False Dmitry I
- Ivan Kolesnikov as Ilya, polyglot and interpreter, in a sentimental relationship with Xenia Borisovna
- Kirill Zaytsev as Nechay Kolyvanov, former palace guard and voivod of False Dmitry I
- Alexandra Nikiforova as Sophia Fyodorovna, daughter of Fyodor Konya and wife of Nechay
- Sergey Diakov as Pronka, an archer and palace guard, friend of Nechay
- Petr Rykov as Vasily Golitsyn (1643)
- Andrey Mironov-Udalov as John, Prince of Schleswig-Holstein (Johan) betrothed to Xenia Borisovna
- Jana Yesipovich as Pronka's Wife
- Nikolai Kozak as Betsky / Old Porfiry
- Anton Kapanin as a street performer
- Larissa Shakhvorostova as Feklitsa, a Soothsayer
- Dmitry Frid as Doctor Fidler, court physician-healer
- Pyotr Zaychenko as Patriarch Hermogenes of Moscow
- Yuri Tarasov as False Dmitri II
- Stanislav Lyubshin as Archimandrite Ioasaf
- Sergey Marin as Voyevoda, Prince Grigory Dolgorukov
- Alexey Ovsyannikov as Mikhail Saltykov, a Boyar of False Dmitry II
- Anton Batyrev as Ivan Zarutsky, Ataman (commander) of the Don Cossacks and Marina Mniszech's lover
- Anastasia Mikhailova as Ephrosinya, a young and beautiful runaway girl
- Nikolai Larchuzhenkov as Emyelka, the dwarf jailer
- Maxim Vajov as Mikhail, a Cossack
