= Godunov =

Godunov (Russian: Годунов) is a Russian surname.

Godunov can refer to the following:

- House of Godunov, two tsars of Russia and their kin:
  - Tsar Boris Fyodorovich Godunov (1552–1605), a regent of Russia from 1584 to 1598 and then tsar from 1598 to 1605
  - Tsar Fyodor Borisovich Godunov (1589–1605), son of tsar Boris Godunov, ruled less than a year as Feodor II after his father's death in 1605; murdered in June the same year
  - Xenia Borisovna Godunova (later the Nun Olga) (1582–1622), daughter of tsar Boris Godunov
  - Irina Feodorovna Godunova (later the Nun Alexandra) (1557–1603), wife of tsar Feodor I Ioannovich and sister of tsar Boris Godunov
- Sergei Konstantinovich Godunov (1929–2023), a Russian born mathematician who contributed to the finite volume method (FVM)
  - Godunov's scheme, a mathematical method suggested by Sergei Godunov in 1959
  - Godunov's theorem, a theorem proven by Sergei Godunov in 1954
- Aleksandr Borisovich Godunov (1949–1995), a Russian ballet dancer and actor
- Petr Ivanovich Godunov(?–1670), a Siberian governor
  - Godunov map, commissioned by Alexis of Russia on 15 November 1667 and named after Petr Ivanovich Godunov
- Godunov, a Russian television drama TV series, centered upon the fate of the Godunov family
