= Maria of Russia =

Maria of Russia may refer to:

- Maria of Borovsk (1418–1484), wife of Vasily II of Moscow and mother of Ivan III of Russia
- Maria of Tver (1442–1467), first wife of Ivan III of Russia and mother of Ivan the Young
- Maria Vladimirovna of Staritsa (1560–1610), cousin of Ivan IV of Russia; wife of Magnus, King of Livonia, she was the last known descendant of Zoe Palaiologina

== Consorts ==
- Maria Temryukovna (1544–1569), second wife of Ivan IV of Russia
- Maria Dolgorukaya (died 1580), seventh wife of Ivan IV of Russia
- Maria Nagaya (died 1608), eighth wife of Ivan IV of Russia
- Maria Grigorievna Skuratova-Belskaya (died 1605), wife of Boris Godunov
- Maria Buynosova-Rostovskaya (died 1626), second wife of Vasili IV of Russia
- Maria Dolgorukova (1601–1625), first wife of Michael I of Russia
- Maria Miloslavskaya (1625–1669), first wife of Alexis I of Russia
- Maria Feodorovna (Sophie Dorothea of Württemberg) (1759–1828), wife of Paul I of Russia
- Maria Alexandrovna (Marie of Hesse) (1824–1880), wife of Alexander II of Russia
- Maria Feodorovna (Dagmar of Denmark) (1847–1928), wife of Alexander III of Russia

== Grand Duchesses ==
- Grand Duchess Maria Pavlovna of Russia, (1786–1859) daughter of Paul I of Russia
- Grand Duchess Maria Alexandrovna of Russia (1799–1800), daughter of Alexander I of Russia
- Grand Duchess Maria Nikolaevna of Russia, (1819–1876) daughter of Nicholas I of Russia
- Grand Duchess Maria Mikhailovna of Russia (1825–1846), daughter of Grand Duke Michael Pavlovich of Russia
- Grand Duchess Maria Alexandrovna of Russia (1853–1920), daughter of Alexander II of Russia
- Duchess Marie of Mecklenburg-Schwerin (1854–1920), wife of Grand Duke Vladimir Alexandrovich of Russia as Grand Duchess Maria Pavlovna of Russia, called "the Elder"
- Princess Maria of Greece and Denmark (1876–1940), wife of Grand Duke George Mikhailovich of Russia as Grand Duchess Maria Georgievna of Russia
- Grand Duchess Maria Pavlovna of Russia, (1890–1958) daughter of Grand Duke Paul Alexandrovich of Russia, called "the Younger"
- Grand Duchess Maria Nikolaevna of Russia, (1899–1918) daughter of Nicholas II of Russia
- Grand Duchess Maria Kirillovna of Russia (1907–1951), daughter of Grand Duke Cyril Vladimirovich of Russia
- Grand Duchess Maria Vladimirovna of Russia (born 1953), great-great-granddaughter of Alexander II of Russia, pretender to the title of Empress of Russia

== See also ==
- Maria (disambiguation)
- Maria Alexandrovna (disambiguation)
- Maria Feodorovna (disambiguation)
- Maria Pavlovna (disambiguation)
