= Marie Pavlovna =

Marie Pavlovna may refer to:

- Maria Pavlovna, Grand Duchess of Saxe-Weimar-Eisenach (1786–1859), daughter of Tsar Paul I of Russia
- Grand Duchess Maria Pavlovna of Russia (1890–1958)

== See also ==
- Grand Duchess Maria of Russia (disambiguation)
