= Maria Pozharskaya =

Princess Maria Feodorovna Pozharskaya (died 1607 AD), lady-in-waiting to the Russian court, and a favorite of tsarina Maria Skuratova-Belskaya (wife of Tsar Boris Godunov).

She married prince Michail Fedorovich Pozharsky in 1571, and became the mother of Dmitry Pozharsky. As a member of the elite nobility, she was appointed lady-in-waiting to the tsar's daughter Xenia Borisovna of Russia, but advanced to be lady-in-waiting to the tsarina, Maria Skuratova-Belskaya. She defeated her rivals Maria Lykova (married to Michael Lykov), and became a favorite of the tsarina. She was the highest ranking lady-in-waiting of the tsarina during the reign of Godunov, and had a great deal of influence.

After the reign of Godunov, she retired from court to a convent and became a nun by the name Evdokia.
