= Bogolep =

Bogolep (Russian: Боголеп) is an archaic Russian Orthodox Church monastic name created as a calque of the Greek word Theoprepēs (θεοπρεπής), "God-befitting", "marvellous" Theoprepēs, known in Russia as Феопрепий was a martyr venerated in Russian Orthodoxy. Litvina and Uspensky write that the name is known as an exclusively monastic one, although there are some vague indications that the name could have been used by lay men. A number of Russian Orthodox monks had this name, including:

- Bogolep of Chorny Yar (1647 - 1654), Russian monk venerated in Russian Orthodox Church
- Bogolep was the monastic name accepted by Boris Godunov before the death
- Bogolep Adamov (fl. 1700), Russian Orthodox bishop
- Bogolep Antsukh (1911-1978) - Archbishop of Kirovograd and Nikolaev of the Russian Orthodox Church
- Bogolep Goncharenko (born 1978) is the Archbishop of Alexandria and Svitlovodsk of the Ukrainian Orthodox Church

== See also ==
- Bogolepov
