= Maria Alexandrovna =

Maria Alexandrovna may refer to:

- Grand Duchess Maria Alexandrovna of Russia (1799–1800), daughter of Alexander I of Russia
- Maria Alexandrovna (Marie of Hesse) (1824–1880), princess of the Grand Duchy of Hesse and Empress consort of Tsar Alexander II of Russia
- Grand Duchess Maria Alexandrovna of Russia (1853–1920), daughter of the above, also a Duchess of Edinburgh and Duchess of Saxe-Coburg and Gotha
- Maria Alexandrovna "Masha" Enzensberger (1943–1991), Russian writer and translator from Russian to English
- Maria Alexandrovna Sechenova (1839–1929), first female Russian ophthalmologist
- Maria Alexandrovna Ulyanova (1835–1916), mother of Vladimir Lenin

== See also ==
- Maria of Russia (disambiguation)
