= Maria Nagaya =

Tsarina of Russia from 1581 to 1584

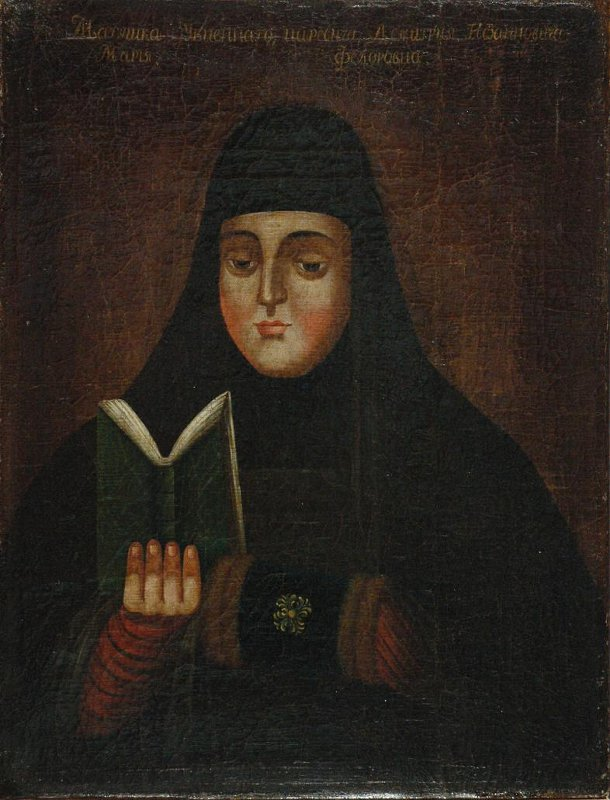

Tsaritsa of all Russia
- Tenure: 1581–1584
- Predecessor: Maria Dolgorukaya (Disputed existence)
- Successor: Irina Godunova
- Born: 1 January 1558
- Died: 28 June 1608 (aged 50); Moscow
- Spouse: Ivan the Terrible
- Issue: Tsarevich Dmitry Ivanovich
Names
- Maria Feodorovna Nagaya
- Dynasty: Rurik (by marriage)
- Father: Feodor Feodorovich Nagoy

Maria Feodorovna Nagaya, named Marfa as a nun, (Russian: Мари́я Фёдоровна Нага́я, Ма́рфа; 1 January 1558 - 28 June 1608) was a Russian tsarina as the last (sixth, possibly seventh or eighth) wife of Ivan the Terrible. She was mother of Tsarevich Dmitry of Uglich and played a role in the reign and deposition of False Dmitry I.

== Ancestry and early life ==
Maria Feodorovna was the daughter of the okolnichy Feodor Feodorovich Nagoy. It has been suggested by historian-genealogists N.V. Myatlev and Anatoly Gryaznoy that Maria Feodorovna's mother was a daughter or sister of Prince Vasily Semenovich Funikov-Kemsky and brought the fiefdom of Zvenigorod to the family as her dowry.

== Marriage to Ivan IV ==
Maria Feodorovna's uncle, Afanasy Nagoy, was the Russian ambassador to the Crimean Khanate and a close confidant of Tsar Ivan IV. This probably contributed to Ivan's decision to marry Maria Feodorovna. They wed in 1580.

Ivan had had five confirmed wives before, as well as a possible sixth and seventh (whose existences are disputed). The Russian Orthodox Church only recognised his first four marriages as legal, as, to this day, members are only permitted to take three wives, and Ivan had gained special permission to marry for a fourth time by claiming that he had not consummated his third marriage.

Contemporary English diplomat Jerome Horsey claims that Ivan married Maria Feodorovna after repudiating his previous wife in order to pacify his son Ivan Ivanovich and the boyars, who were worried by rumors that the Tsar planned to flee to England. This is, however, only speculation. The wedding took place in an intimate setting, in the presence of Ivan's trusted courtiers. On 19 October 1582, Maria Feodorovna gave birth to her only child, Dmitry of Uglich. Dmitry was Ivan IV's third child to survive infancy. He already had two adult sons, Ivan Ivanovich and Feodor Ivanovich from his first marriage. Ivan Ivanovich died a month after Dmitry's birth, probably killed by his father during an argument. This made Feodor Ivanovich, a man of weak health, the heir apparent.

== During the reign of Feodor I ==
=== Exile to Uglich ===
Upon the death of Ivan IV in 1584 and the accession of Feodor I, Maria Feodorovna, her son (now the heir presumptive), and her brothers were immediately removed from court by the regency council (which had been appointed to rule by Ivan IV on account of Feodor's physical and mental frailty). They were sent to live in Uglich, her son's principality. Jerome Horsey writes that she was supplied with a fitting number of attendants, dresses, jewellery, food, horses, and other necessary possessions.

A later account, the ‘New Chronicler’ alleges that the Nagoys were the victims of a conspiracy by Boris Godunov, who exiled or imprisoned the late Tsar's favourites and confiscated their wealth. However, this rendering of the story was intended to smear Godunov. The decision to expel the Nagoys from Moscow was probably made by the entire Duma. They feared that the family would act against Tsar Feodor to place their young relative, Tsarevich Dmitry on the throne and thereby grab power for themselves. It is nevertheless certain that numerous relatives of Maria Feodorovna were banished. According to some sources, Feodor also forbade priests to commemorate Tsarevich Dmitry in religious services due to his illegitimacy (his parents' marriage being invalid in the eyes of the church).

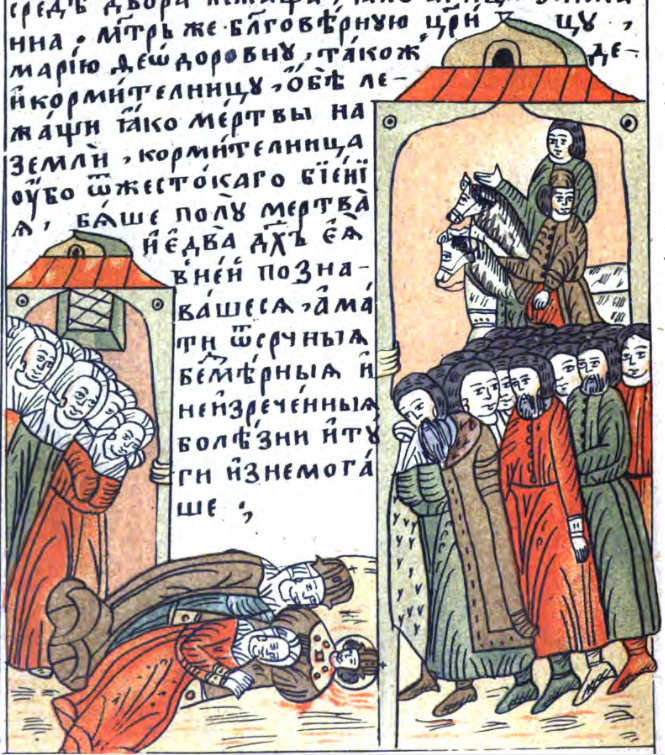
Miniature of Maria Feodorovna at the scene of her son's death.

=== Death of Tsarevich Dmitry Ivanovich ===
On 15 May 1591, Maria Feodorovna's son Dmitry died under mysterious circumstances. He was found on the ground of the courtyard with his throat slit. Maria Feodorovna ran to the scene, beat Dmitry's nanny Vasilisa Volokhova with a log, and accused Volokhova's son, Osip Volokhov, as well as Daniil Bityagovsky and Nikita Kachalov of killing the Tsarevich. The bells of the town were rung to alert people, who gathered in confusion. The father of Daniil, Mikhail Bityagovsky, attempted to calm tensions, but was murdered. The crowd then lynched the rest of the accused. These events and the subsequent investigation is known as the Uglich Case in Russia.

The investigation concluded that the Tsarevich had died in an accident and that the Nagoys falsified evidence to the contrary. There is no conclusion among historians on the death of Dmitry and the surrounding events. Maria Feodorovna and her brothers were convicted of neglecting the Tsarevich and of the murder of those lynched on 15 May. The men were imprisoned and Maria Feodorovna forced to become a nun under the name of Marfa. She was held either in the Sudin Monastery, located near Vyksa or Cherepovets, or in the Nikolovyksinskaya Hermitage.

== During the reign of Boris Godunov ==
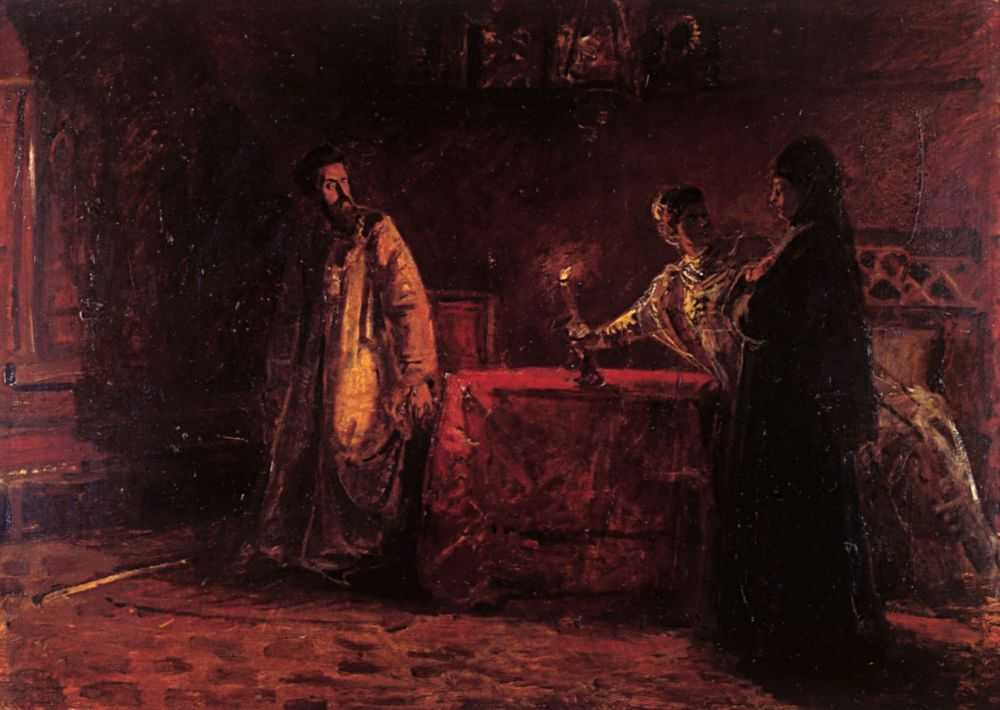
Nikolay Ge's painting of Tsarina Maria's attack.

In 1598, Feodor I died. Rumors spread that Dmitry of Uglich had survived in secrecy. In 1604, Boris Godunov summoned Maria Feodorovna to Moscow, but she did not provide useful information and was sent back. Based on an account by the contemporary Dutch merchant and diplomat Isaac Massa, Maria Feodorovna was taken into Godunov's bedroom in secret at night. ‘Tell the truth, is your son alive or not?’, Boris is said to have asked. Maria Feodorovna claimed not to know. Godunov's wife, Maria Grigorievna, took up a lighted candle, screaming at Maria Feodorovna, ‘Oh, you w[hore]! You dare to say “I don't know”―when you know certainly!’, then threw the candle in her eyes. Godunov protected Maria Feodorovna from his wife's attack. According to Massa, Maria Feodorovna then stated that she had been informed that her son was smuggled abroad, but that the people who told her this were no longer alive. Infuriated, Godunov ordered that she should be watched more strictly and live under more severe circumstances than before.

== During the reign of False Dmitry I ==
On 18 July 1605, Maria Feodorovna made a ceremonial entry into Moscow, where she recognized False Dmitry I as her son. She settled in the Kremlin's Ascension Convent, and her family members were freed and restored to their ranks and properties. She received her alleged son's bride, Marina Mniszech, as was customary for a tsar's mother.

At an unspecified time, a Swedish man appeared in Poland, claiming that he had been sent by Maria Feodorovna from Moscow. He relayed to King Sigismund III of Poland, as well as to Marina Mciszech's father, that Maria Feodorovna considered Dmitry I a ‘deceiver’. Maria Feodorovna had allegedly complied with recognising him as her son ‘for her own reasons’, but now accused him of attempting to desecrate the grave of her real son. She, ‘being a mother, felt very sorry’ and ‘prevented this’. Mykola Kostomarov believes that this message was sent by boyars conspiring to depose Dmitry. It is unknown whether Maria Feodorovna was aware of what was said in her name. In the meantime, the Nagoy family played a prominent part at the wedding Dmitry I.

=== Murder of False Dmitry ===
When False Dmitry was murdered in 1606, Maria Feodorovna refused to acknowledge him as her son. An assailant slapped Dmitry and demanded that he identify himself. Dmitry replied that he was the Tsar, son of Ivan IV, then urged them to ask his ‘mother’ for proof. Prince Ivan Golitsyn shouted, ‘I have just been with the Tsarina Marfa; she says that this is not her son: she recognised him against her will, fearing murder, and now she renounces him!’ Vasili Shuysky rode on horseback into the courtyard and confirmed to the crowd that the only son of Maria Feodorovna had died in Uglich. After this, False Dmitry was killed.

The mob dragging his body stopped at the Ascension Convent, calling out to Maria Feodorovna, ‘Speak, Tsarina Marfa, is this your son?’ Different sources give her reaction differently. According to the Notes of Nemoevsky, Maria Feodorovna simply answered ‘Not mine!’. According to others, she said, ‘You should have asked me when he was alive, but now, since you killed him, he is no longer mine!’. The Jesuit Notes report that she first answered, ‘You know better’, and when the crowd began threatening her, she added confidently, ‘This is not my son at all’. On 3 June 1606, she solemnly received the relics of her son Tsarevich Dmitry as they arrived to Moscow from Uglich.

== Later life and death ==
In 1607, Maria Feodorovna's brother Mikhail was sent by Tsar Vasili IV Shuysky to Yelets with a letter from Tsarina Maria Feodorovna and an image of Tsarevich Dmitry to admonish the rebellious people of Seversk and certify Dmitry's death. In 1609, along with other commanders, he defended Moscow from Polish attacks and the supporters of False Dmitry II.

Different sources give different dates for Maria Feodorovna's death: 1608, 1610, or 1612. Her gravestone, preserved in the Kremlin reads, ‘[i]n the year 7116 [1608], on the 28th of June, the servant of God, nun Tsarina Maria Feodorovna of Tsar Ivan of All Russia, passed away’.

== In popular culture ==
- Maria Nagaya is mentioned in Pyotr Kireevsky's Songs;
- She is featured in the epic poem Grishka Otrepyev (as ‘Marfa Matveyevna’);
- She is a character in Friedrich Schiller's unfinished drama Demetrius (as Maria Feodorovna).
- In the 1909 film The Death of Ivan the Terrible, she is played by Elizaveta Uvarova;
- In the 2009 film Tsar, she is played by Maria Eshpai-Simonova;
- In the 2011 film Boris Godunov, she is played by Anna Churina;
- In the 2018 TV series Godunov, she is played by Irina Pegova.

== Bibliography ==
- Зимин А. А. В канун грозных потрясений: Предпосылки первой Крестьянской войны в России. М., 1986

Russian royalty
Vacant Title last held by Maria Dolgorukaya	Tsaritsa of Russia; 1581–1584	Vacant Title next held by Irina Godunova
