= Tsar of all Russia =

Title of Russian monarchs from 1547 to 1721

- Standard of the Tsar (c. 1693)

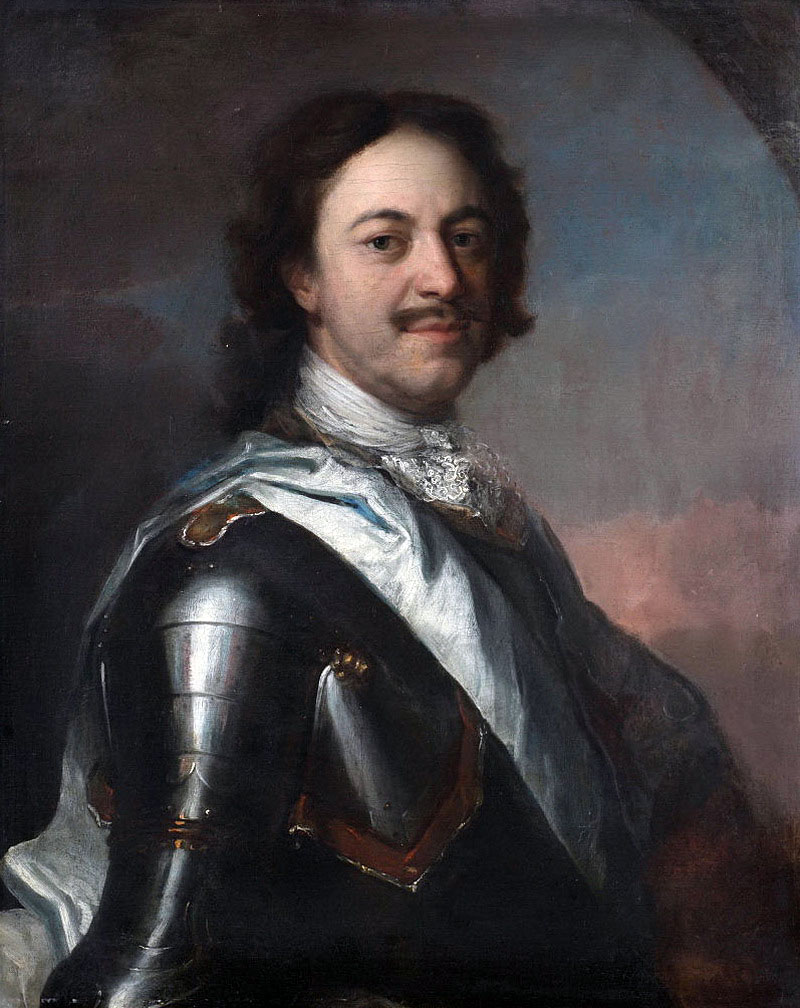
- Last to reign Peter I 7 May 1682 – 2 November 1721

Details
- Style: His Majesty
- First monarch: Ivan IV
- Last monarch: Peter I
- Formed: 16 January 1547
- Abolished: 2 November 1721
- Appointer: Hereditary

The Tsar of all Russia, formally the Sovereign, Tsar and Grand Prince of all Russia, (Note: Russian: Государь, Царь и Великий Князь всея Руси, romanized: Gosudar', Tsar i Veliky Knyaz' vseya Rusi. Also rendered as Sovereign, Tsar and Grand Prince of all Rus'.) was the title of the Russian monarch from 1547 to 1721. During this period, the state was a tsardom.

The first Russian monarch to be crowned as tsar was Ivan IV, who had held the title of sovereign and grand prince. In 1721, Peter I adopted the title of emperor and proclaimed the Russian Empire. The old title continued to be popularly used to refer to the emperor.

== Title ==
The full title varied between tsars. The full title of Alexis was:

By the Grace of God, We, the Great Sovereign, Tsar and Grand Prince Alexei Mikhailovich, Autocrat of all Great, Little and White Russia, Moscow, Kiev, Vladimir, Novgorod, Tsar of Kazan, Tsar of Astrakhan, Tsar of Siberia, Sovereign of Pskov and Grand Prince of Tver, Yugorsk, Perm, Vyatka, Bulgar and others, Sovereign and Grand Prince of Novgorod of the Lower Land, Chernigov, Ryazan, Rostov, Yaroslavl, Beloozero, Udoria, Obdoria, Kondia, and Ruler of all the Northern Countries, the Sovereign of the Iverian Lands, the Kartlian and Georgian Tsars and the Kabardian Lands, the Cherkasy and Mountainous Princes and many other States and Lands of the East and West, and the North from Father and Grandfather, and Heir, and Sovereign, and Possessor.

== History ==
=== 15th century ===
According to Ihor Ševčenko, the Russian claim to imperial rank dates to at least the 15th century, and is "characterized by the first deliberate Russian (not exclusively Muscovite) attempts to transform Russian princes into the counterparts of the Byzantine emperors, and later to claim the Byzantine heritage for themselves and their land", when the grand prince of Moscow added "ruler of all-Russia" to their title at the time he asserted his authority over most of the other Russian cities and princes. The word tsar, an early Russian name for basileus, was used because the Russians were more inclined to underline their separation from Western Europe than to promote Westernization by using foreign titles.

Following the expansion of his realm, the grand prince Ivan III (r. 1462–1505) took the title of sovereign of all Russia and claimed inheritance to all the former territories of Kievan Rus', including those under Lithuanian control. The unification of the Russian principalities fostered a sense of an imperial role of the grand prince of Moscow as the independent ruler of all Russia. Following his marriage to Sophia Palaiologina, a niece of the last Byzantine emperor, Ivan began to intermittently use the title of tsar from 1473. At first, he used the title in dealings with inferiors. In 1488, the Holy Roman Emperor offered Ivan a kingship, but Ivan rejected this, declaring that he and his ancestors had been rulers of their own lands from time immemorial. According to Isabel de Madariaga: "This incidentally is not the outrageously arrogant reaction it has sometimes been taken to be, but the natural reaction of a ruler who had never been a vassal of the Holy Roman Emperor (nor indeed of the empire of the East, nor of the papacy), and who claimed to inherit the role of the basileis". Ivan also began to insist on calling himself tsar in negotiations with the Habsburgs, but the emperors resisted this.

In the 1480s, Ivan's full title was: By the Grace of God, the Great Sovereign of the Russian Land, Grand Prince Ivan Vasilyevich, Tsar of All Russia, Vladimir, and Moscow, and Novgorod, and Pskov, and Yugorsk, and Vyatka, and Perm, and others. At the beginning of the 1490s, he also had the following title: Ivan, by the Grace of God, Sovereign of All Russia and Grand Prince of Vladimir, and Moscow, and Novgorod, and Pskov, and Tver, and Yugorsk, and Perm, and Bulgar, and others. In diplomatic correspondence, the Latinized version of his title gospodar' vseia Rusi was dominus totius Russiae, and around the same time, the traditional name Rus' in Russian was transformed into Rus(s)iia or Ros(s)iia.

=== 16th century ===
Vasily III (r. 1505–1533), Ivan's son and successor, continued to use the title of tsar. Around the same time, the concept of Moscow as the "third Rome" gained ground. This theory is usually attributed to Philotheus of Pskov, who pointed out to Vasily that "two Romes have fallen, but the third still stands, and there will be no fourth". One of his epistles also says to Vasily: "all the empires of the Orthodox Christian faith have gathered into your single empire... you are the only tsar for Christians in the whole world...". In the Tale of the Princes of Vladimir, dating from the early 16th century, the Rurikid rulers of Moscow are alleged to have descended from not only Rurik, but also a brother of Augustus Caesar. It is difficult to determine how genuinely the Russian tsars believed in their Roman ancestry, but it was used to support the claim of imperial descent going back to Rome.

On 4 August 1514, Holy Roman Emperor Maximilian I sent a letter to Vasily III requesting again an alliance against Poland and Lithuania, where he spoke of the brotherly friendship between them and referred to Vasily as Kayser or imperator. (Note: "Kayser vnnd Herscher aller Rewssen und Groszfürste zu Wolodimer".) However, the ambassador Sigismund von Herberstein in 1516 still referred to Vasily as rex et dominus totius Russiae. After 1514, the full title used by Vasily III was: By the Grace of God, the Tsar and Sovereign of All Russia and the Grand Prince of Vladimir, Moscow, Novgorod, Pskov, Smolensk, Tver, Yugorsk, Perm, Vyatka and Bulgar, and others, the Sovereign and Grand Prince of Novgorod of the Lower Land, and Chernigov, and Ryazan, Volotsk, Rzhev, Belyov, Rostov, Yaroslavl, Beloozero, Udoria, Obdoria and Kondia.

At the age of three, Ivan IV (r. 1533–1584) acceded the throne in 1533, when his father Vasily III died. On 16 January 1547, Ivan IV was the first to be crowned tsar, at the age of 16; his ceremony drew upon Byzantine precedents deliberately. The consent of the patriarch of Constantinople to use the title was eventually given. In 1561, the patriarch referred to Ivan IV as "tsar and sovereign of Orthodox Christians of the whole universe", likening him to a Byzantine emperor. In exchange for acceptance of the title of tsar, the papacy hoped to gain recognition of Roman supremacy; one letter written by the pope and drafted for delivery in 1550 addressed Ivan IV as Universorum Ruthenorum imperator, but Polish obstruction prevented any papal mission from occurring. During the reign of Feodor I (r. 1584–1598), the establishment of the patriarchate of Moscow in 1589 was Boris Godunov's biggest contribution to the evolution of the doctrine of Moscow as the "third Rome", with the tsar as the emperor of Christians.

=== 17th century ===
The childless death of Feodor I in 1598 marked the end of the Rurik dynasty and the beginning of the Time of Troubles, a period of political chaos and foreign intervention. One of the imposters to the throne, False Dmitry I, laid claim to the title of imperator or tsesar (tsar), (Note: German form used in the Holy Roman Empire.) which was rejected by his Polish sponsors, who had long resisted the title of tsar. Eventually, the Romanov dynasty replaced the Rurik dynasty, but the position of the Russian monarch was weakened. (Note: The Romanovs did not directly descend from an ancestor of the Rurik dynasty; Michael Romanov was only the grandson of Nikita Romanovich Zakharyin-Yuriev, brother of Anastasia Romanovna, Ivan IV's first wife.) In addition, Michael Romanov was an elected ruler, giving him a lower status, which meant he had to secure recognition as both the legitimate ruler and tsar. Most European powers and princes of the Holy Roman Empire eventually recognized Michael, and the emperor accepted de facto recognition of Michael, without the title of Majesty.

The Romanovs strove to recover the imperial dignity of their predecessors. In the Great State Book of 1672, the Romanovs are directly connected to Rurik, with no sign that this succession was broken. During the reign of Alexis (r. 1645–1676), the annexation of Little Russia and White Russia, including Kiev, allowed the tsar to claim the title of tsar of all the Russias. A Russian diplomatic initiative to create a coalition against the Ottoman Empire in the 1670s, with the Russian envoy to Rome, Paul Menzies, instructed to only accept documents containing the title "tsar", was unsuccessful, and it was not until 1685 that the papacy would begin addressing the Russian ruler as tsar. Negotiations for Russia to join the Holy League succeeded after the temporary peace following the Truce of Andrusovo was consolidated and upheld by the Treaty of Perpetual Peace between Russia and Poland.

The title of samoderzhets (autocrat), like tsar, is derived from the title of the Byzantine emperor and it began to penetrate into the language of the state. Feodor I was the first to be crowned as both the tsar and autocrat, but it would not become standard in the tsar's title until the 17th century. While tsar remained the official title of the monarch, samoderzhets was included in the title of Michael of Russia when he was proclaimed as tsar in 1613. It was also frequently used in addresses to the tsar. The Sobornoye Ulozheniye of 1649 also refers to Alexis as samoderzhets.

=== 18th century ===
Peter I (r. 1682–1725) realized the need to secure the position of Russia within the European states system, including the importance of securing recognition from the Holy Roman Emperor of the equality of the titles of tsar and emperor. Following his victory at the Battle of Poltava, Peter brought up the question of the title of emperor to the Viennese court and the rank of Majesty, mentioning that even the Porte in Constantinople addressed the Russian ruler as Majesty, though this was rejected by Vienna. In 1717, Peter defended his right to use the title of imperator, using the letter from Maximilian I to Vasily III to support his claim. Following Russia's victory against Sweden in the Great Northern War and the conclusion of the Treaty of Nystad in September 1721, the Governing Senate and Synod urged Peter to accept the titles of Father of the Fatherland, All-Russian Emperor, and Peter the Great. On 2 November [O.S. 22 October] 1721, Peter formally adopted the title of emperor. Vienna initially refused to accept the title, but eventually conceded after the letter was deemed to be genuine.

The motivation for the change can be explained by the prestige policy associated with the Westernization of Russia under Peter. Peter viewed Russia as no longer a grand principality, while the title of tsar was seen as meaningless in the context of the Latin West, and thus Peter's claim to the title of emperor could be bound to the resurrection of the Byzantine Empire. Although Peter had no particular opinion of the Byzantine Empire, as he lived in a period where statesmen were influenced by secular thought and thus played down the religious element of the Russian Empire, he was aware of the political importance of Russia's position as the only independent Orthodox realm. Peter did not have any intention of recreating the political structure of the Byzantine Empire, but he did not underestimate the influence which an Orthodox empire could exercise on the Orthodox populations living in both the Ottoman Empire and the Habsburg territories.

Before the wedding of his wife Catherine as the empress of Russia in 1724, Peter stated in his manifesto: "it is known to everyone that in all Christian realms it is the unfailing custom for potentates to crown their wives, and not only now but of old this was frequently the custom of the Orthodox Greek emperors [imperatory, not basileis]", and therefore he proposed that her coronation should be held in the following year. According to Isabel de Madariaga: "But if Peter was indeed asserting the right of the ruler of Russia to be regarded as the heir of the Orthodox empire of Byzantium, he dressed up his claim in western clothes, and gave it a classical Roman ancestry". Boris Uspenskij and Viktor Zhivov noted that Byzantinization cohabited easily with Westernization, while it increased throughout the 18th century as a result of the sacralization of the monarch.

For the common people, the transition was not easily accepted. For the peasants and the Old Believers, the title of emperor was viewed as being bestowed by the pope and hence satanic in origin. The Westernized nobility came to believe that the new title was superior to that of tsar. Sergey Solovyov, a nationalist historian, argued in his public lectures that Peter had long contemplated becoming a Russian eastern emperor, not a Roman eastern emperor, stating: "He had nothing to do with Rome, and he rejected this antiquated notion, useless to Russia and to her history. He was working only for Russia and with Russia, with her and for her he obtained the title of emperor and he did not separate his native land from his own glory". Although other historians have also rejected the idea that Peter was influenced by the Byzantine Empire, more modern historians trace Peter's actions to Byzantine influence.

== List of tsars ==
Name	Lifespan	Reign start	Reign end	Notes	Family	Image
Ivan IV: the Terrible; Иван Васильевич (Иван Грозный)	25 August 1530 – 28 March 1584	26 January 1547	28 March 1584	Son of Vasily III and Elena Glinskaya	Rurik	
Feodor I: the Blessed; Фёдор Иванович (Фёдор Блаженный)	31 May 1557 – 17 January 1598	28 March 1584	17 January 1598	Son of Ivan IV and Anastasia Zakharyina-Yuryeva	Rurik	
Boris: Борис Фёдорович Годунов	1551 – 13 April 1605	3 March [O.S. 21 February] 1598	23 April [O.S. 13 April] 1605	Brother-in-law of Feodor I Elected by Zemsky Sobor	Godunov	
Feodor II: Фёдор Борисович Годунов	1589 – 20 June 1605	23 April [O.S. 13 April] 1605	20 June [O.S. 10 June] 1605	Son of Boris Godunov and Maria Grigorievna Skuratova-Belskaya; Murdered	Godunov	
False Dmitry I: Лжедмитрий I	1581 – 17 May 1606	20 June [O.S. 10 June] 1605	27 May [O.S. 17 May] 1606	Claimed to be son of Ivan IV; Murdered	Rurik (claimed)	
Vasily IV: Василий Иванович Шуйский	22 September 1552 – 12 September 1612	19 May 1606	17 July 1610	Orchestrated a conspiracy against False Dmitry, proclaimed Tsar by the nobles and later deposed Pretender: False Dmitry II (since June 1607)	Shuysky	
Michael: Михаил Фёдорович	12 July 1596 – 12 July 1645	26 July 1613	12 July 1645	Founder of Romanov Dynasty; First cousin once removed of Feodor I Co-ruler: Patriarch Filaret (1619–1633)	Romanov	
Alexis: the Quietest; Алексей Михайлович (Алексей Тишайший)	9 May 1629 – 29 January 1676	12 July 1645	29 January 1676	Son of Michael and Eudoxia Streshneva	Romanov	
Feodor III: Фёдор III Алексеевич	9 June 1661 – 7 May 1682	29 January 1676	7 May 1682	Son of Alexis and Maria Miloslavskaya	Romanov	
Ivan V: Иван V Алексеевич	6 September 1666 – 8 February 1696	7 May 1682	8 February 1696	Son of Alexis and Maria Miloslavskaya; Younger brother of Feodor III and Sophia; Elder half-brother of Peter I Co-ruler: Peter I Regent: princess Sophia (8 June 1682 – 17 September 1689)	Romanov	
Peter I: Пётр I Алексеевич	9 June 1672 – 8 February 1725	7 May 1682	2 November 1721	Son of Alexis and Natalya Naryshkina; Younger half-brother of Feodor III Co-ruler: Ivan V (7 May 1682 – 8 February 1696); Regent: Natalya Naryshkina (7 May – 2 June 1682), Sophia Alekseyevna (8 June 1682 – 17 September 1689)	Romanov	

== See also ==
- Emperor of Russia
- Grand Prince of Vladimir
- List of Russian monarchs
- Prince of Moscow

== Bibliography ==
- Bushkovitch, Paul (18 March 2021). Succession to the Throne in Early Modern Russia: The Transfer of Power 1450–1725. Cambridge University Press. ISBN 978-1-108-47934-9.
- Crummey, Robert O. (6 June 2014). The Formation of Muscovy 1300 - 1613. Routledge. ISBN 978-1-317-87200-9.
- Feldbrugge, Ferdinand J. M. (2 October 2017). A History of Russian Law: From Ancient Times to the Council Code (Ulozhenie) of Tsar Aleksei Mikhailovich of 1649. BRILL. ISBN 978-90-04-35214-8.
- Filyushkin, A. I. (2006). Титулы русских государей (in Russian). Альянс-Архео. ISBN 978-5-98874-011-7.
- Madariaga, Isabel De (17 June 2014). Politics and Culture in Eighteenth-Century Russia: Collected Essays by Isabel de Madariaga. Routledge. ISBN 978-1-317-88190-2.
- Pavlov, A. P. (2006). "Fedor Ivanovich and Boris Godunov (1584–1605)". In Perrie, Maureen (ed.). The Cambridge History of Russia: Volume 1: From Early Rus' to 1689. Cambridge University Press. p. 266. doi:10.1017/CHOL9780521812276. ISBN 978-1-107-63942-3.
- Sashalmi, Endre (25 October 2022). Russian Notions of Power and State in a European Perspective, 1462-1725: Assessing the Significance of Peter's Reign. Academic Studies PRess. ISBN 978-1-64469-419-0.
- Wortman, Richard S. (31 October 2013). Scenarios of Power: Myth and Ceremony in Russian Monarchy from Peter the Great to the Abdication of Nicholas II - New Abridged One-Volume Edition. Princeton University Press. ISBN 978-1-4008-4969-7.
