= Irina Godunova =

Tsaritsa of Russia from 1584 to 1598

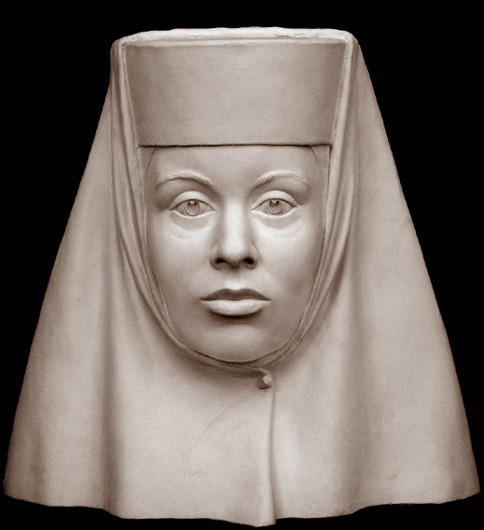
- Forensic facial reconstruction by S. Nikitin

Tsaritsa of all Russia
- Reign: 17 January [O.S. 7 January] 1598 – 3 March [O.S. 21 February] 1598
- Predecessor: Feodor I of Russia
- Successor: Boris Godunov

Tsaritsa consort of all Russia
- Tenure: 28 March [O.S. 18 March] 1584 – 17 January [O.S. 7 January] 1598
- Predecessor: Maria Nagaya
- Successor: Maria Skuratova-Belskaya
- Born: 1557; Moscow, Russia
- Died: 26 October 1603 (aged 45–46); Novodevichy Convent, Russia
- Burial: Ascension Convent, Kolomenskoye; Archangel Cathedral, Kremlin (1929)
- Spouse: Feodor I of Russia
- Issue: Feodosiya
- Dynasty: Godunov
- Father: Feodor Ivanovich Godunov
- Mother: Stepanida Ivanovna
- Religion: Russian Orthodox

Irina Feodorovna Godunova (Russian: Ирина Фёдоровна Годунова, romanized: Irina Fyodorovna Godunova; 1557 – 26 October 1603), also known by her monastic name Alexandra (Александра), was the tsaritsa consort of all Russia by marriage to Feodor I from 1584 until his death on 17 January [O.S. 7 January] 1598. As her husband died without surviving children, she was the de facto ruler of Russia until she retired to Novodevichy Convent nine days later. She remained the nominal ruler of Russia until her brother Boris Godunov was elected tsar on 3 March [O.S. 21 February] 1598.

== Life ==
The precise dates of some of the events in Irina's life are uncertain. Most sources indicate that she was picked by Ivan the Terrible to be the wife of the tsarevich Feodor in 1580 or 1581, although some sources say this occurred as early as 1574. At 23 or 24 (assuming the latter dates), she would have been considered old for a bride in Muscovy, where the common age for marriage was in the mid-teens, and it is not certain why she married so relatively late in life. Her marriage was arranged by her brother in 1575, who successfully managed to secure a place in the Tsar's inner circle and the status of boyar through his sister's marriage.

Irina reportedly surpassed her spouse in intelligence, education and sophistication, and she quickly acquired influence over Feodor, and learned to navigate in court affairs. Feodor was reportedly mentally underdeveloped and physically weak and the marriage was childless, but Tsar Ivan did not interfere in their marriage.

She became tsaritsa upon the coronation of her husband in 1584.

=== Tsaritsa ===
Throughout her husband's reign (and, indeed, ever since her marriage), Irina was expected to produce a male heir. Feodor was physically and mentally frail and, were he to die without male issue, it was questionable whether his half-brother, Dmitri, would be considered legitimate, as he was the result of Ivan the Terrible's seventh marriage and the Orthodox Church recognized only up to four marriages as legitimate. Indeed, even with Dmitri as a possible successor, Irina remained under pressure to produce an heir and in 1585, she traveled to the Trinity-St. Sergei Monastery north of Moscow in hopes of a miraculous cure for her alleged infertility, but still she did not bear a child until 1592 — a daughter named Feodosia Fedorovna who died less than two years later in January 1594.

The couple's continued infertility led to court intrigue. Thus, in 1585, Metropolitan Dionysius proposed that Feodor divorce Irina, blaming her for being infertile and arguing that, for the good of the state and the dynasty, the tsar ought to remarry and produce a male heir. The suggestion was seen as an effort on the part of the Shuiskies and other boyar clans to undercut the Godunovs. In response, Boris Godunov had the metropolitan deposed and confined to the Khutyn Monastery just outside Novgorod the Great. In 1587, several leading boyar families advised Feodor to divorce Irina for the same reason. As a response, Feodor approved of the punishment proposed by Irina and Boris for the boyars and had the boyar daughters who had been suggested as a replacement for Irina forcibly made nuns.

In January 1589, Irina received Patriarch Jeremiah II of Constantinople in the Golden Tsaritsa Chamber, who arrived in Moscow to establish a patriarchal chair in Russia and put Job, the first Russian patriarch, on it. The description of this event was left by Bishop Arseny of Elasson, who accompanied the church hierarch to Russia:

"The queen rose quietly from her throne at the sight of the patriarchs and met them in the middle of the chamber, humbly asking for blessings. The Ecumenical saint, having overshadowed her with a prayerfully large cross, called out:"Hail, faithful and gracious Irina, queen of the East and West and all Russia, adornment of the Nordic countries and affirmation of the Orthodox faith!""

With the death of Dmitry under strange circumstances in Uglich, north of Moscow, on 15 May 1591, Irina was placed under increasing pressure to produce an heir. If she failed and Feodor died without a son, the Rurikid dynasty that had ruled Rus and Muscovy since the ninth century would become extinct, likely resulting in a bloody succession struggle. The couple remained barren for more than a decade, although whether this was due to Feodor's poor health or to infertility on Irina's part is uncertain.

Tsaritsa Irina had great influence during the reign of Feodor and participated in state affairs, to a degree that exceeded the expected limits of a Russian tsaritsa and a monarch's wife in general. Initially she did so discreetly without advertising her influence. Soon, however, she began participating in government more directly, frequently placing her own name on Feodor's decrees. Irina also became well known abroad, corresponding with Queen Elizabeth I of England and Patriarch Meletis Pigasos of Alexandria. Feodor trusted Irina, deferred to her, did not wish to exalt himself at her expense, trusted her to handle the affairs of state for him and relied on her advice. In one version, the tsar named a new fortress Tsaritsyn (now Volgograd) after her to strengthen her authority.

=== Later life ===
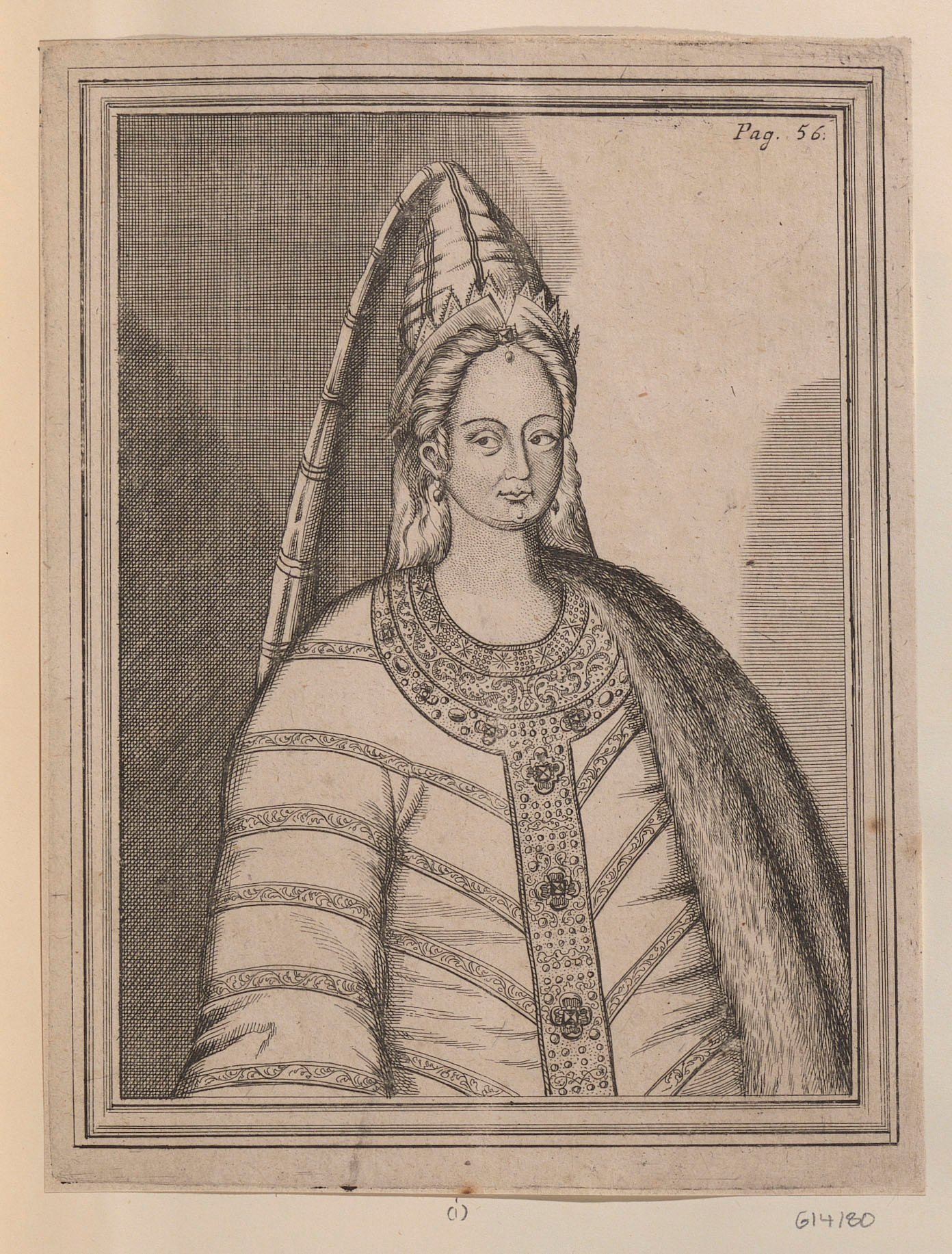
Engraving of Irina Godunova

Upon her husband's death on 17 January 1598, the Rurikids in the male line were extinct. Some days before his death, on 3 January, Feodor had stated that Irina would become a nun after his death and made her promise to honor his wish. However, after his death, Irina, with no other candidate to the throne, feigned that Fedor had bequeathed the throne to her and announced her intention to "take power for a short time, so as to protect the Tsardom from tumult". No woman had ever before reigned in her own right in Rus' or Russia. The Godunov family convinced the patriarch of the Russian Orthodox church to grant its consent to Irina as an autocrat, and the Boyar Duma to pledge loyalty to her as "Great Sovereign". The legal situation was difficult, however: as Irina had never been crowned, she had no authority to hold or convey power: furthermore, although the church and nobility was willing to accept her rule, the public in Moscow rioted at the suggestion of her succession and called her "shameless". For nine days after the death of Feodor, the situation was unclear and Irina was de facto ruler. Her first act as sovereign was to declare an amnesty of prisoners to win good will of the public, but this act failed as it released dangerous criminals and caused discontent.

Nine days after the death of her spouse, "in order to prevent great revolt", Irina relinquished formal power to the Boyar Duma and de facto power to her brother Boris Godunov. She retired (some historians call it an abdication) to the Novodevichy Monastery (Convent) on the south side of Moscow, where she took monastic vows under the name Aleksandra. In fact, it was at the monastery that Boris Godunov was asked by Patriarch Job of Moscow and the Zemsky Sobor to become tsar. Despite that, Irina continued to sign official decrees until the day in February 1598 when Boris was acclaimed as tsar by the Boyar Duma. Upon the wish of her brother, her name always preceded any other member of the imperial family in the church prayers until her death.

Irina died on 26 October 1603 (others sources give the date 26 September, still others the year 1604) in the Novodevichy Monastery. Like all queens, she was buried in the Ascension Convent of the Moscow Kremlin.

=== Legacy ===
Several embroideries created by Irina are in the collection of the State Historical Museum on Red Square (along with similar work by Sophia Palaiologina, the wife of Ivan III, and Anastasia, the first wife of Ivan the Terrible.)

Russian royalty
Vacant Title last held by Maria Nagaya	Tsaritsa consort of all Russia; 1584–1598	Vacant Title next held by Maria Skuratova-Belskaya
Regnal titles
Preceded by Feodor I	— DISPUTED — Tsaritsa regnant of all Russia; 1598	Succeeded by Boris
