= Bogolepov =

Bogolepov (Russian: Боголепов), feminine: Bogolepova is a Russian surname of two possible, related, origins, both associated with the calque from the Greek word Theoprepēs, "God-befitting". It may be a patronymic surname derived from the given name Bogolep or it may be an arbitrary Russian surname originated in clergy, given to a pleasantly-looking or pious student of a seminary. Notable people with the surname include:

- Alexander Bogolepov (1886 – 1980), Russian theologian and religious writer
- Nikolay Bogolepov (1846 – 1901) Russian jurist and Minister of National Enlightenment
