= Maria Feodorovna =

Maria Feodorovna was the name taken by two distinct Russian empresses of originally German and Danish ethnicity:

- Maria Feodorovna (Sophie Dorothea of Württemberg), daughter of Frederick II Eugene, Duke of Württemberg; wife of Emperor Paul I of Russia; mother of Emperors Alexander I and Nicholas I of Russia
- Maria Feodorovna (Dagmar of Denmark), daughter of King Christian IX of Denmark; wife of Emperor Alexander III of Russia; mother of Emperor Nicholas II of Russia

== See also ==
The following women have name Maria, patronymic Feodorovna or similar, and also, unlike the above empresses, a surname:

- Maria Feodorovna Pozharskaya (died 1607), a Russian lady-in-waiting and favorite of tsarina Maria Skuratova-Belskaya.
- Maria Feodorovna Morozova (1830–1911), a Russian entrepreneur
- Maria Fjodorovna Zibold (1849–1939), a Russian and Serbian physician
- Maria Fedorovna Andreeva née Yurkovskaya (1868–1953), a Russian actress and Bolshevik administrator
