= Grand Duchess Maria Pavlovna of Russia =

Grand Duchess Maria Pavlovna of Russia may refer to:

- Grand Duchess Maria Pavlovna of Russia (1786–1859), daughter of Paul I of Russia
- Grand Duchess Maria Pavlovna of Russia (1854-1920) or Duchess Marie of Mecklenburg-Schwerin, daughter-in-law of Alexander II of Russia, called "the Elder"
- Grand Duchess Maria Pavlovna of Russia (1890–1958), daughter of Grand Duke Paul Alexandrovich of Russia, called "the Younger"
