= John, Prince of Schleswig-Holstein =

John
- Duke of Holstein
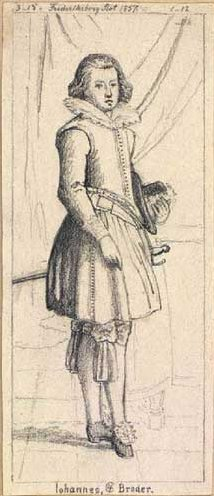
- Drawing of John (1857)
- Born: 9 July 1583
- Died: 28 October 1602 (aged 19)
- House: Oldenburg
- Father: Frederick II of Denmark and Norway
- Mother: Sofie of Mecklenburg-Schwerin

Johan of Schleswig-Holstein (9 July 1583 – 28 October 1602) was the youngest son of Frederick II of Denmark and Norway and Sophia of Mecklenburg-Schwerin. He went to Russia in 1602 as the bridegroom of Boris Godunov's daughter Ksenia (Xenia), but fell ill and died before the marriage could take place. It is possible that Boris Godunov's ministers may have poisoned him. The cancelled marriage between John and Ksenia was an attempt to ally Denmark-Norway with the Russian Empire.

== Ancestry ==
Ancestors of John, Prince of Schleswig-Holstein

16. Christian I of Denmark (=#28)
8. Frederick I of Denmark (=#14)
17. Dorothea of Brandenburg (=#29)
4. Christian III of Denmark
18. John Cicero, Elector of Brandenburg
9. Anna of Brandenburg
19. Margaret of Thuringia
2. Frederick II of Denmark
20. John V of Saxe-Lauenburg
10. Magnus I, Duke of Saxe-Lauenburg
21. Dorothea of Brandenburg
5. Dorothea of Saxe-Lauenburg
22. Henry IV, Duke of Brunswick-Lüneburg
11. Catherine of Brunswick
23. Catherine of Pomerania-Wolgast
1. John, Prince of Schleswig-Holstein
24. Magnus II, Duke of Mecklenburg
12. Albrecht VII, Duke of Mecklenburg
25. Sophie of Pomerania-Wolgast
6. Ulrich, Duke of Mecklenburg
26. Joachim I Nestor, Elector of Brandenburg
13. Anna of Brandenburg
27. Elizabeth of Denmark
3. Sophie of Mecklenburg-Güstrow
28. Christian I of Denmark (=#16)
14. Frederick I of Denmark (=#8)
29. Dorothea of Brandenburg (=#17)
7. Elizabeth of Denmark
30. Bogislaw X, Duke of Pomerania
15. Sophie of Pomerania
31. Anna of Poland

== Other sources ==
- "The Muscovite Embassy of 1599 to Emperor Rudolf II of Habsburg," by Isaiah Gruber (1999): page 86 (with footnote 3)
- Büsching, Anton Friedrich (1773). Magazin für die neue Historie und Geographie, VII Theil: VII Archiv-Nachrichten von alten Unterhandlungen welche zwischen dem russischen und danischen hofe von 1554 bis 1677. Halle: Johann Jacob Curt. pp. 316–317.
- Büsching, Anton Friedrich (1773). Magazin für die neue Historie und Geographie, VII Theil: Johannis des jüngern, Herzogs von Denmark Reussische Reise und Einzug zu Moskau 1602. Halle: Johann Jacob Curt. pp. 255–298.
