= Boris Godunov =

Tsar of Russia from 1598 to 1605

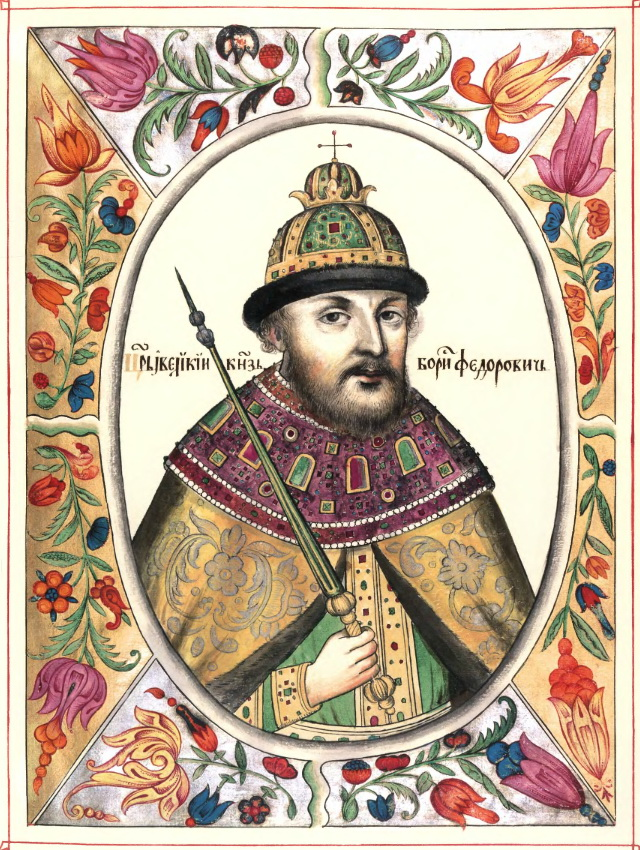
- Portrait in the Tsarsky titulyarnik (1672)

Tsar of all Russia
- Reign: 3 March [O.S. 21 February] 1598 – 23 April [O.S. 13 April] 1605
- Coronation: 1 September 1598
- Predecessor: Irina (disputed) or Feodor I
- Successor: Feodor II
- Born: 12 August [O.S. 2 August] 1552; Vyazma, Russia
- Died: 23 April [O.S. 13 April] 1605 (aged 52); Moscow, Russia
- Burial: Godunov Mausoleum in front of the Cathedral of the Assumption at the Trinity Lavra of St. Sergius
- Spouse: Maria Skuratova-Belskaya
- Issue: Feodor II of Russia; Xenia Godunova
Names
- Boris Fyodorovich Godunov; Борис Фёдорович Годунов
- Dynasty: Godunov
- Religion: Russian Orthodox

Boris Feodorovich Godunov (/ˈɡɒdənɒf, ˈɡʊdənɒf/; Russian: Бори́с Фёдорович Годуно́в, pronounced [bɐˈrʲis ˈfʲɵdərəvʲɪdʑ ɡədʊˈnof]; 12 August [O.S. 2 August] 1552 – 23 April [O.S. 13 April] 1605) was the de facto regent of Russia from 1585 to 1598 and then tsar from 1598 to 1605 following the death of Feodor I, the last of the Rurik dynasty. After the end of Feodor's reign, Russia descended into the Time of Troubles.

== Early years ==
Boris was the son of Feodor Ivanovich Godunov "Krivoy" (lit. 'the one-eyed', died c. 1568–1570) and his wife Stepanida Ivanovna. His older brother Vasily died young and without issue. There is a version according to which the Godunovs were descended from the Tatar murza Chet, who came to Russia in 1330 during the reign of Ivan Kalita. This version was included in later editions of the 16th-century Gosudarev Rodoslovets, but historians have raised doubts about this version of Godunov's ancestry due to various chronological and genealogical issues.

Godunov's career began at the court of Ivan the Terrible. He is mentioned in 1570 for taking part in the Serpeisk campaign as an archer of the guard. The following year he became an oprichnik – a member of Ivan's personal guard and secret police. In 1570–1571, Godunov strengthened his position at court by his marriage to Maria Grigorievna Skuratova-Belskaya, the daughter of Malyuta Skuratov-Belskiy, head of the oprichniki.

In 1580, Ivan chose Boris Godunov's sister Irina Godunova (1557–1603) to be the wife of his second son and eventual heir, Feodor Ivanovich (1557–1598). On this occasion, Godunov was promoted to the rank of boyar. On 15 November 1581, Godunov was present when Ivan murdered his own eldest son, Tsarevich Ivan. Godunov tried to intervene but received blows from the tsar's sceptre. The elder Ivan immediately repented, and Godunov rushed to get help for the tsarevich, who died four days later.

== Regency ==
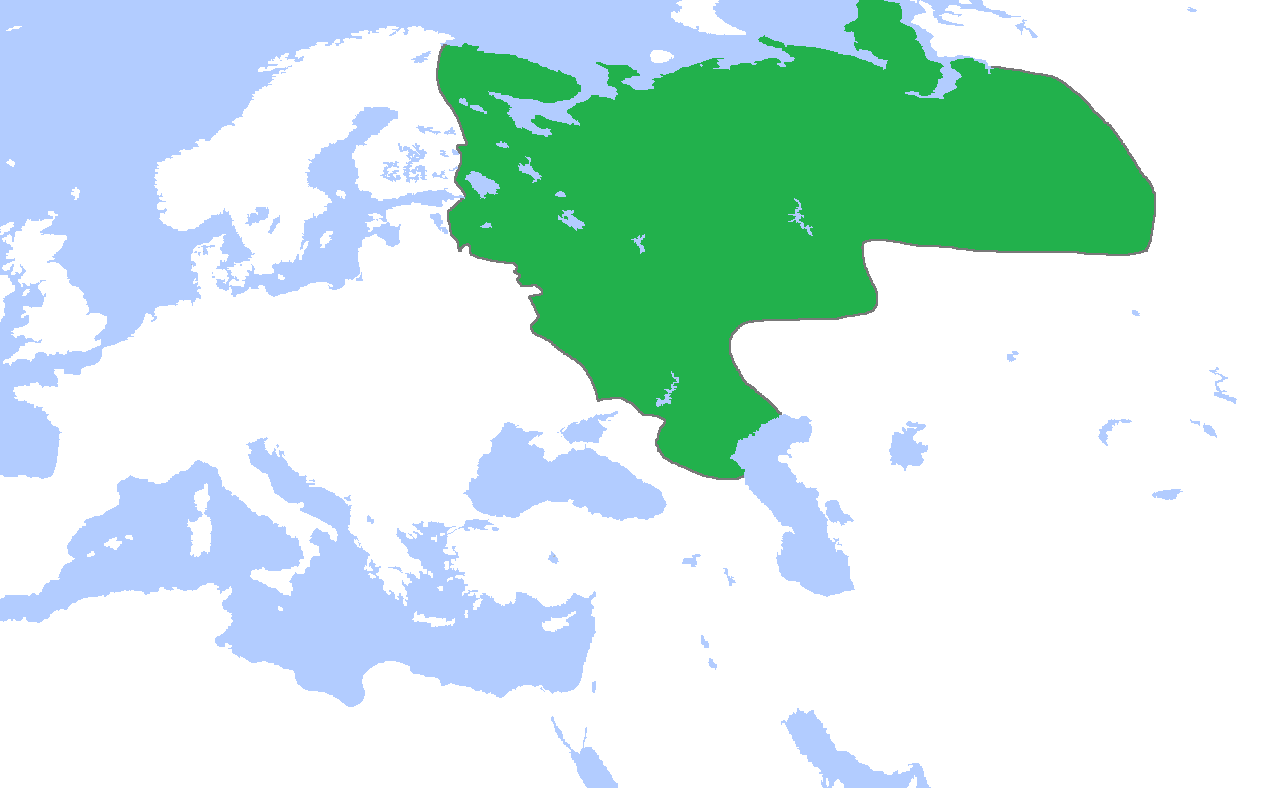
Territorial extent of Russia in 1600

Three years later, on his deathbed, Ivan IV appointed a council whose members consisted of Godunov, Feodor Nikitich Romanov, Vasili Shuiski and others to guide his son and successor of Russia Feodor I, who was feeble in both mind and body: "he took refuge from the dangers of the palace in devotion to religion; and though his people called him a saint, they recognized the fact that he lacked the iron to govern men."

At the time of his death, Ivan also had a three-year-old son, Dmitry Ivanovich (1581–1591), from his seventh and last marriage. This son (and his mother's family) had no claim to the throne because the Eastern Orthodox Church only recognized Ivan's first three marriages as legitimate. Shortly after Ivan's death, the council had both Dmitri and his mother, Maria Nagaya, moved to Uglich, some 120 miles north of Moscow. Dmitri died there in 1591 at the age of ten under suspicious circumstances.

When Dmitri's death was announced by the ringing of the church bell, the population of Uglich rose up in order to protest against the suspected assassination, which it believed was commissioned by Boris Godunov. Troops swiftly quelled the rebellion. Godunov ordered the removal of the Uglich bell's clapper (the bell's "tongue"). He had the offending bell ringer flogged in public and exiled to Siberia along with the townspeople who had not been executed.

An official commission which was headed by Vasili Shuiski was sent to determine the cause of the boy's death. The official verdict was that the boy had cut his throat during an epileptic seizure. Ivan's widow claimed that her son had been murdered by Godunov's agents. Godunov's guilt was never established and shortly thereafter, Dmitri's mother was forced to take the veil. Dmitry Ivanovich was laid to rest and promptly, though temporarily, forgotten.

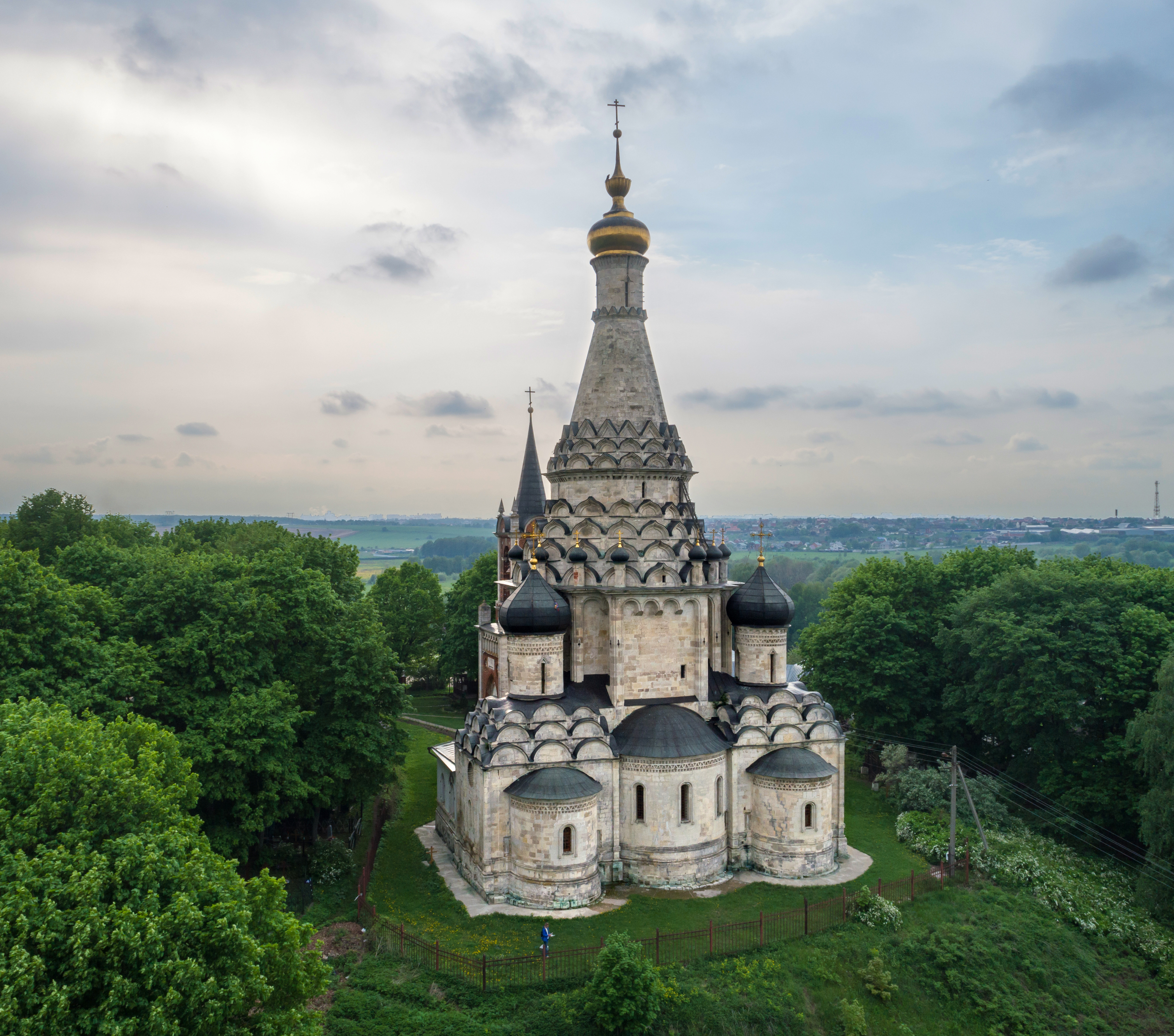
Godunov's estate near Moscow

At the coronation of Feodor Ivanovich as Tsar Feodor I on 31 May 1584, Boris received honors and riches as a member of the regency council, in which he held the second place during the life of the Tsar's uncle Nikita Romanovich. When Nikita died in 1586, Boris had no serious rival for the regency.

A group of other boyars and Dionysius II, Metropolitan of Moscow, conspired to break Boris's power by divorcing the Tsar from Godunov's childless sister. The attempt proved unsuccessful, and the conspirators were banished or sent to monasteries. After that, Godunov remained supreme in Russia and he corresponded with foreign princes as their equal.

His policy was generally pacific and always prudent. In 1595, he recovered from Sweden some towns lost during the former reign. Five years previously he had defeated a Turkic raid upon Moscow, for which he received the title of Konyushy, an obsolete dignity even higher than that of Boyar. He supported an anti-Turkish faction in the Crimea and gave the Khan subsidies in his war against the sultan.

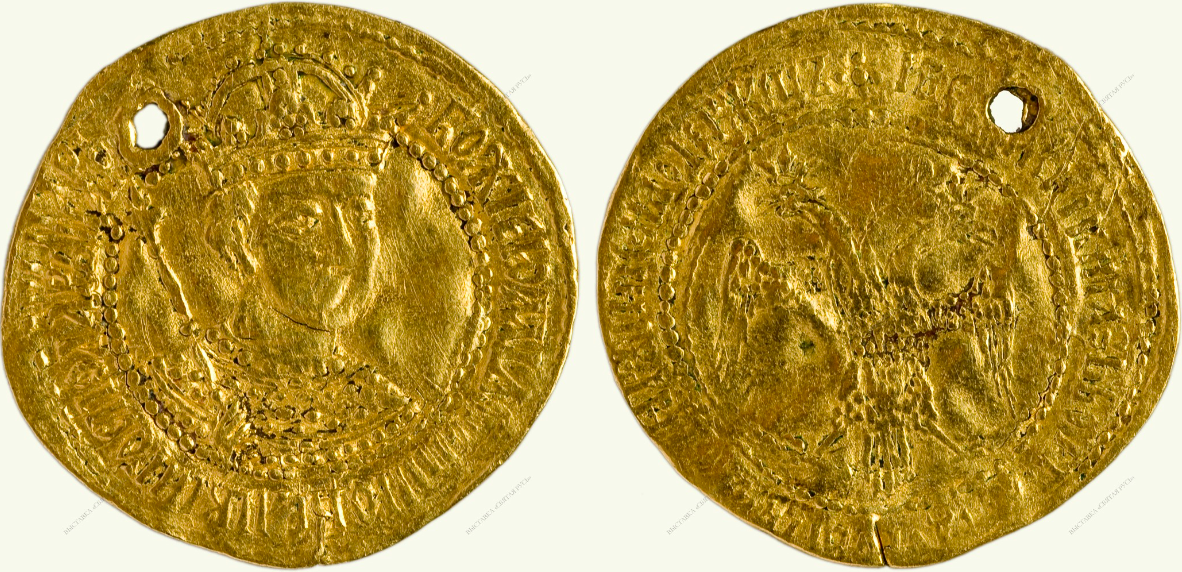
Portrait of Boris on a gold coin

Godunov encouraged English merchants to trade with Russia by exempting them from duties. He built towns and fortresses along the north-eastern and south-eastern borders of Russia to keep the Tatar and Finnic tribes in order. These included Samara, Saratov, Voronezh, and Tsaritsyn, as well as other lesser towns. He colonized Siberia with scores of new settlements, including Tobolsk.

During his rule, the Russian Orthodox Church received its patriarchate, placing it on an equal footing with the ancient Eastern churches and freeing it from the influence of the Patriarch of Constantinople. This pleased the Tsar, as Feodor took a great interest in church affairs.

In Godunov's most important domestic reform, a 1597 decree forbade peasants from transferring from the land of one landowner to another (which they had been freely able to do each year around Saint George's Day in November), thus binding them to the soil. This ordinance aimed to secure revenue, but it led to the institution of serfdom in its most oppressive form. (See also Serfdom in Russia.)

== Reign ==
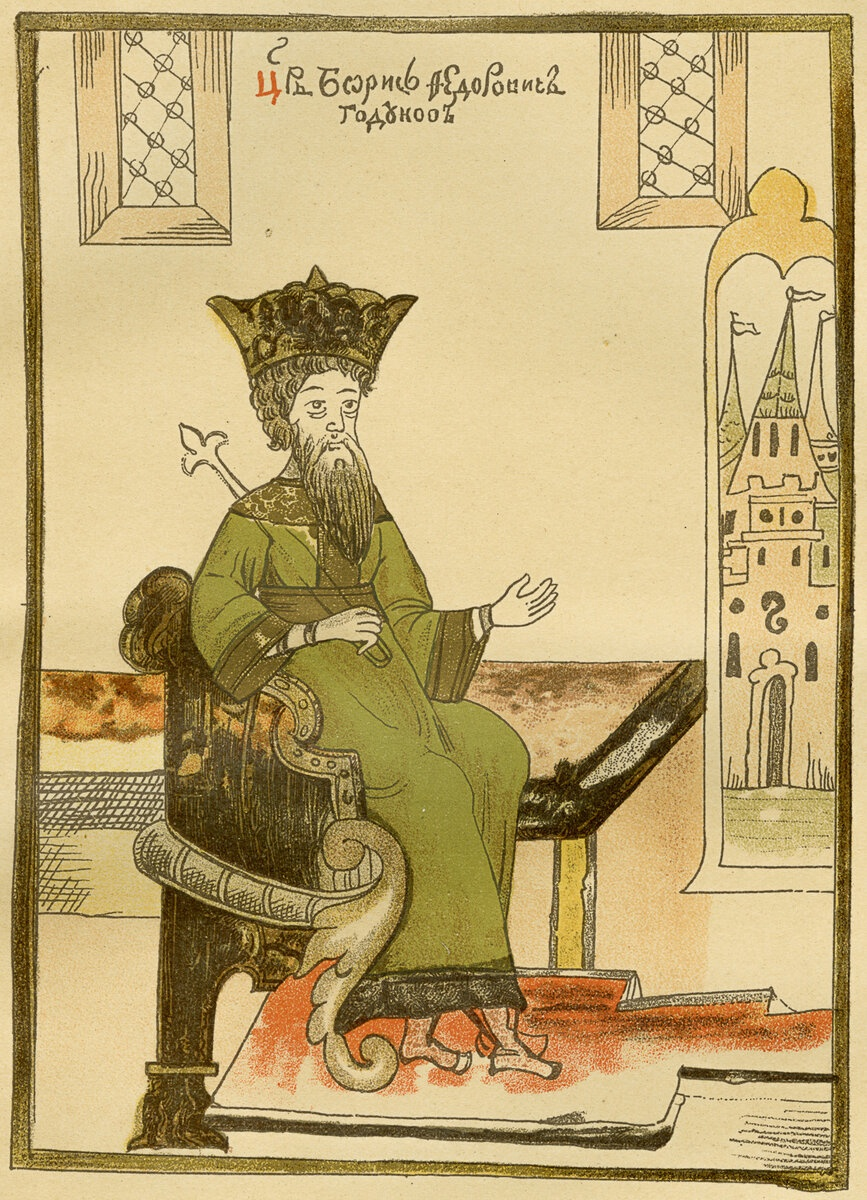
Tsar Boris in a 1630 miniature

Upon the death of the childless tsar Feodor on 7 January 1598, self-preservation as much as ambition constrained Boris to seize the throne. Had he not done so, the mildest treatment he could have hoped for would have been lifelong seclusion in a monastery. His election was proposed by Patriarch Job of Moscow, who believed that Boris was the only man who would be able to cope with the difficulties of the situation. Boris, however, would only accept the throne from a Zemsky Sobor, or national assembly, which met on February 17 and unanimously elected him on the 21st. On September 1, he was solemnly crowned tsar.

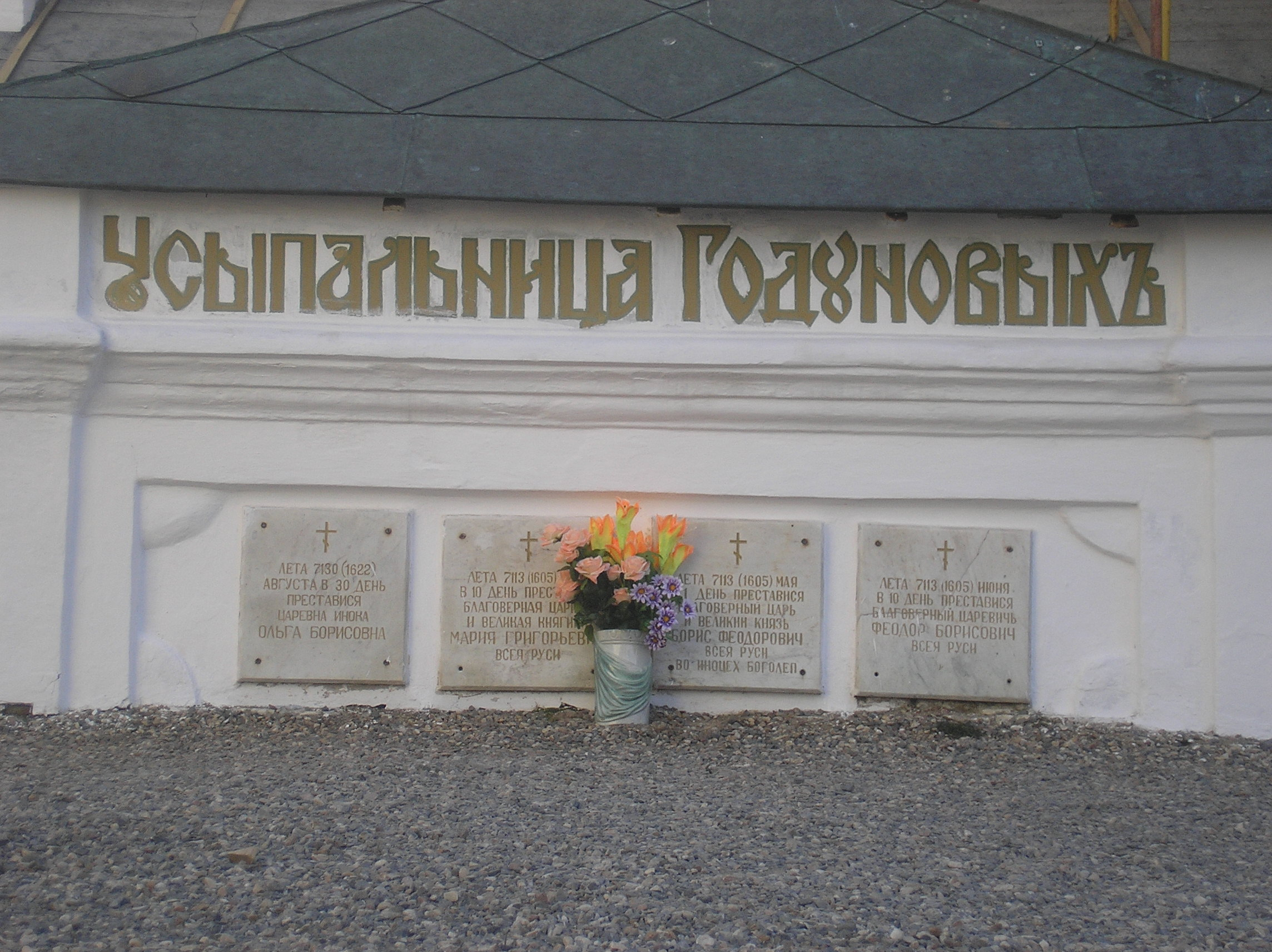
Godunov Mausoleum in front of the Cathedral of the Assumption at the Trinity Lavra of St. Sergius

During the first years of his reign, he was both popular and prosperous, and ruled well. He recognized the need for Russia to catch up with the intellectual progress of the West, and he did his best to bring about educational and social reforms. He was the first tsar to import foreign teachers on a large scale, the first tsar to send young Russians to be educated abroad, and the first tsar to allow Lutheran churches to be built in Russia. After the Russo–Swedish War (1590–1595), he attempted to gain access to the Baltic Sea and he also attempted to obtain Livonia by diplomatic means. He cultivated friendly relations with the Scandinavians in order to intermarry with foreign royal houses and thereby increase the dignity of his own dynasty.

As he did during his regency, Boris received support from various groupings of boyars, including those of the top princely aristocracy. He took advantage of the jostling for precedence among the aristocracy to advance his interests. The result was that a fairly broad circle of boyars came to court and were favored by the tsar, but they did not form a coherent party, and few of them were skilled politicians. According to historian Andrei Pavlov, this was the source of the internal weakness in the Godunovs' government which became apparent after the tsar's death. The main threat to Boris's rule came from the Romanov clan, which was still displeased with being passed over for the tsardom in the election. Boris moved against them in November 1600: the eldest Romanov brother, Feodor Nikitich, was tonsured and exiled to a monastery in the north, and his brothers and followers were exiled or imprisoned in various places, where many of them died. Ruslan Skrynnikov suggests that the repression of the Romanovs was prompted by Boris's illness; he eliminated his main rivals to secure the succession of his son after his death.

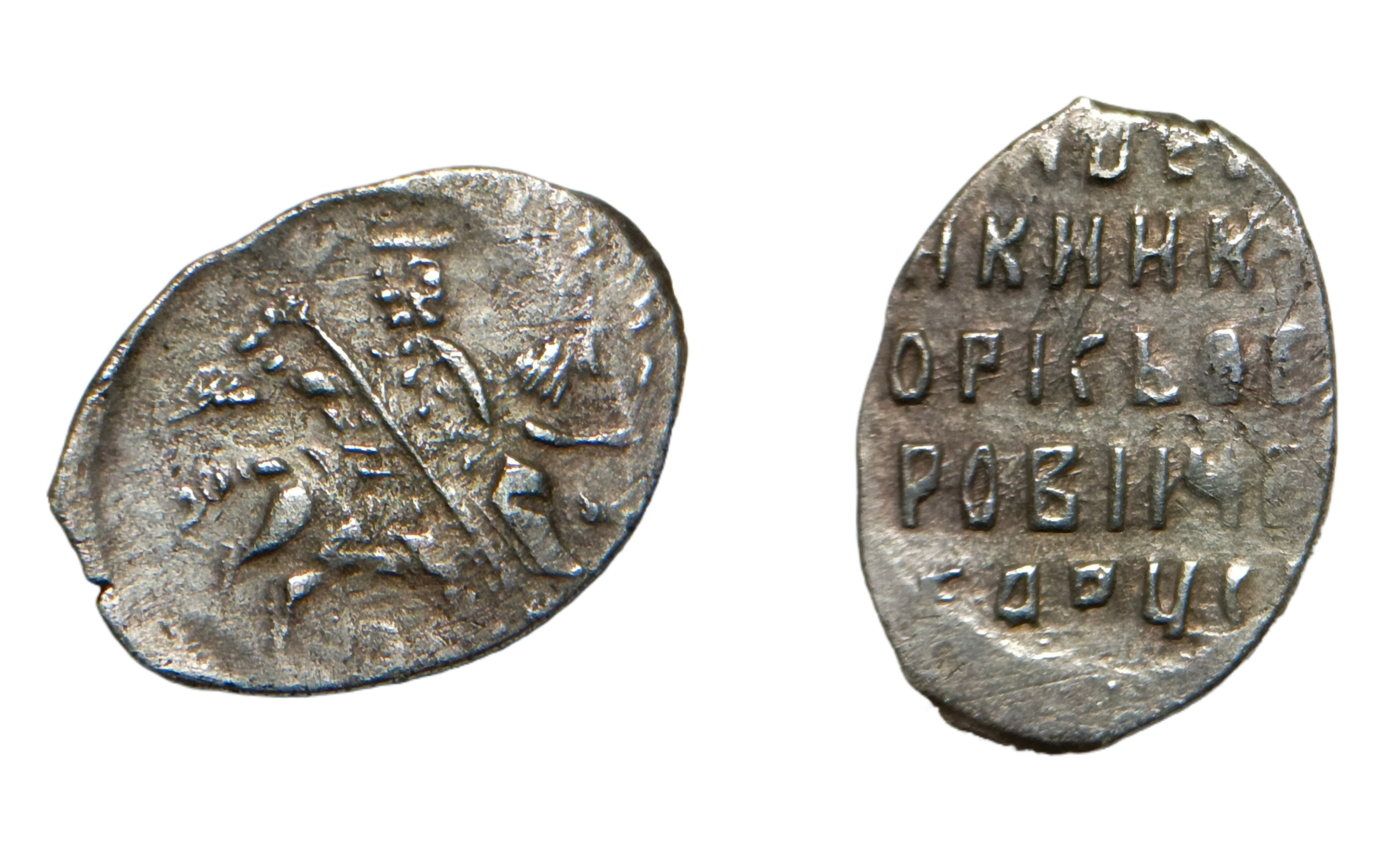
Kopeck of Tsar and Grand Prince Boris Godunov.

Despite the recovery of the economy, at the end of the 16th century the effects of the economic and social crisis in Russia had not been entirely eliminated. This was compounded by a devastating famine in 1601–1603, which killed hundreds of thousands of people. Boris's active relief efforts did not succeed in significantly mitigating the effects of the disaster. Social tensions became more severe, and a large-scale flight of peasants and slaves occurred. In 1601 and again in 1602, the government decreed that the traditional right of peasants to move on Saint George's Day was being restored; however, it was only to apply to the lands of the provincial nobility and the lowest level of courtiers, not to court and state lands or large estates. These measures only exacerbated social tensions: many peasants believed that the decrees had abolished serfdom, while landowners refused to comply with the allowance of peasant movement. The law was not reissued in 1603, and Boris resumed his previous policy of enforcing serfdom, further alienating the peasantry. Unrest began among the lower classes, leading to disturbances in several towns and a battle between the army and insurgents outside Moscow.

The greatest unrest was in the southern frontier region, where large numbers of escaped peasants and slaves had gone and joined the ranks of the 'free' Cossacks. Among the ranks of the Cossacks were also military slaves of the boyars and even indigent nobles. These Cossack groups posed a significant military threat and were made even more restless by the construction of the new border towns under Boris, which encroached upon their lands. The tsar took repressive measures to rein in the Cossacks, to no avail. More unrest was caused in the south by the government's policy of imposing mandatory labor on state lands, which was done to guarantee the availability of food in the region.

Thus, when a pretender appeared claiming to be the late Tsarevich Dmitry, supposedly having survived Godunov's assassination attempt, he received significant support from the free Cossacks and the rebellious population of the southern frontiers. Godunov's government asserted that the pretender was really Grigory Otrepyev, an escaped monk and former nobleman. In the autumn of 1604, the False Dmitry crossed the border into Russia from Poland–Lithuania with a force of 2,000 Polish noblemen and a few thousand Cossacks. He attracted new forces as he advanced deeper into Russia. The victories won by government forces over the pretender at the battles of Novgorod-Seversk and Dobrynichi failed to put an end to the threat, as the whole southern frontier region rose up in revolt. The inhabitants of the southern towns willingly recognized the False Dmitry as tsar and surrendered their governors to him. Historians such as Sergei Platonov and Vasily Klyuchevsky believed that the False Dmitry was promoted by boyars opposed to the rule of the Godunovs, but Andrei Pavlov writes that there is no "direct and reliable evidence of this." Rather, Pavlov writes, the unrest at the time of the pretender's invasion came from the lower rungs of the social hierarchy.

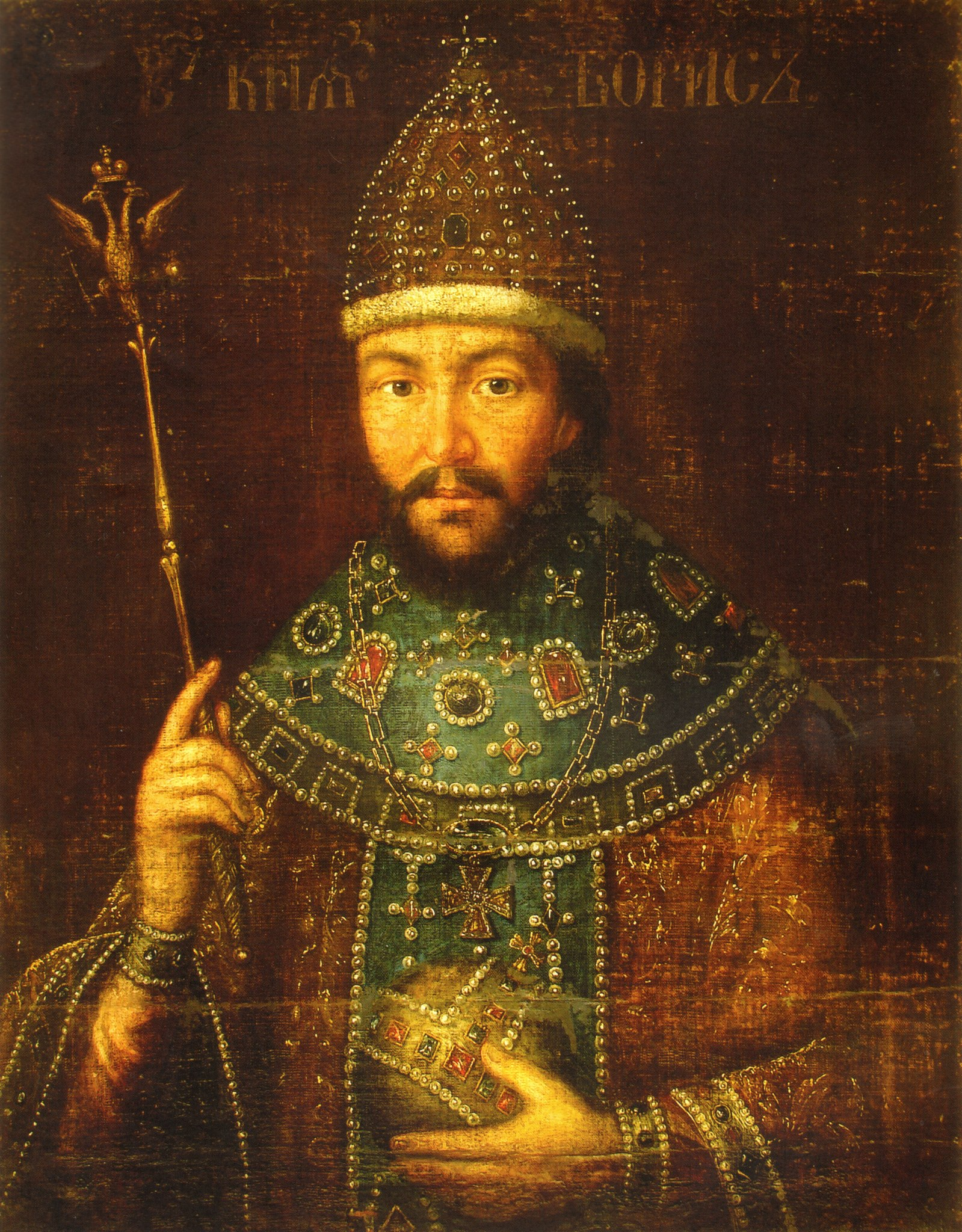
Portrait of Boris Godunov, 17th century

Boris died on 23 April [O.S. 13 April] 1605. According to the French mercenary captain Jacques Margeret, who was at the palace at the time, the tsar died of a stroke. He took monastic orders shortly before his death and accepted the monastic name Bogolep. Although Godunov had been seriously ill for a long time, his death was a shock for everybody. The boyars soon crowned Boris's sixteen-year-old son Feodor as tsar, but Boris's death caused discord among the nobility. Many people believed that Boris was actually guilty of regicide and usurpation and viewed his death as divine punishment and proof of the False Dmitry's authenticity.

In his last days, Boris Godunov had promoted Pyotr Basmanov, a young officer of non-noble origin who had served with distinction in the first campaign against the False Dmitry. Boris hoped that Basmanov would secure the future of his dynasty. However, Basmanov was offended when, after Boris's death, the powerful courtier Semyon Godunov placed his own son-in-law Andrei Telyatevsky 'above' Basmanov in the service registry. This caused Basmanov to betray the Godunovs. More important was the opposition of detachments of servicemen from the southern towns such as Ryazan and Tula. In May 1605, the army at Kromy went over to the side of the False Dmitry, and on 1 June 1605 a revolt in Moscow by supporters of the pretender overthrew Tsar Feodor. On June 10, Feodor and his mother, Boris's widow, were killed by agents of the False Dmitry.

== Family ==
Boris left one son, Feodor II, who succeeded him but only ruled Russia for less than a month, until he and Boris's widow were murdered by the enemies of the Godunovs in Moscow on 10/20 June 1605. Boris's first son, Ivan, was born in 1587 and died in 1588. His daughter, Xenia, was born in 1582. She was engaged to Johann of Schleswig-Holstein, but he died shortly before their planned wedding in October 1602. Xenia was given the name "Olga" upon being forced to take monastic vows at the Voskresensky Monastery in Beloozero and her name is inscribed as "the Nun Olga Borisovna" at the crypt of the Godunovs at the Trinity Lavra of St. Sergius where she lived from 1606, when she sojourned there to attend the reburial of her father, until her death in 1622. Boris, his wife, and their children are buried together in a mausoleum near the entrance of the Assumption Cathedral at Trinity–St. Sergius Lavra.

== Arts and popular media ==
Boris's life was dramatised by the founder of Russian literature, Alexander Pushkin, in his play Boris Godunov (1831), which was inspired by Shakespeare's Henry IV. Modest Mussorgsky based his opera Boris Godunov on Pushkin's play. Sergei Prokofiev later wrote incidental music for Pushkin's drama. In 1997, the score of a 1710 baroque opera based on the reign of Boris by German composer Johann Mattheson was rediscovered in Armenia and returned to Hamburg, Germany. This opera, never performed during the composer's lifetime, had its world premiere in 2005 at the Boston Early Music Festival & Exhibition.

Boris was portrayed on BBC Radio 4 by Shaun Dooley in the radio plays Ivan the Terrible: Absolute Power and Boris Godunov: Ghosts written by Mike Walker and which were the first two plays in the first series of Tsar. The plays were broadcast on 11 and 18 September 2016.

The 2018 Russian television miniseries Godunov is a historical drama based on the lives of the Godunovs with a focus on Boris Godunov (played by Sergey Bezrukov) and lasted for two seasons.

The character Boris Badenov in the cartoon The Rocky and Bullwinkle Show takes his name from a play on Godunov's name.

== Gallery ==
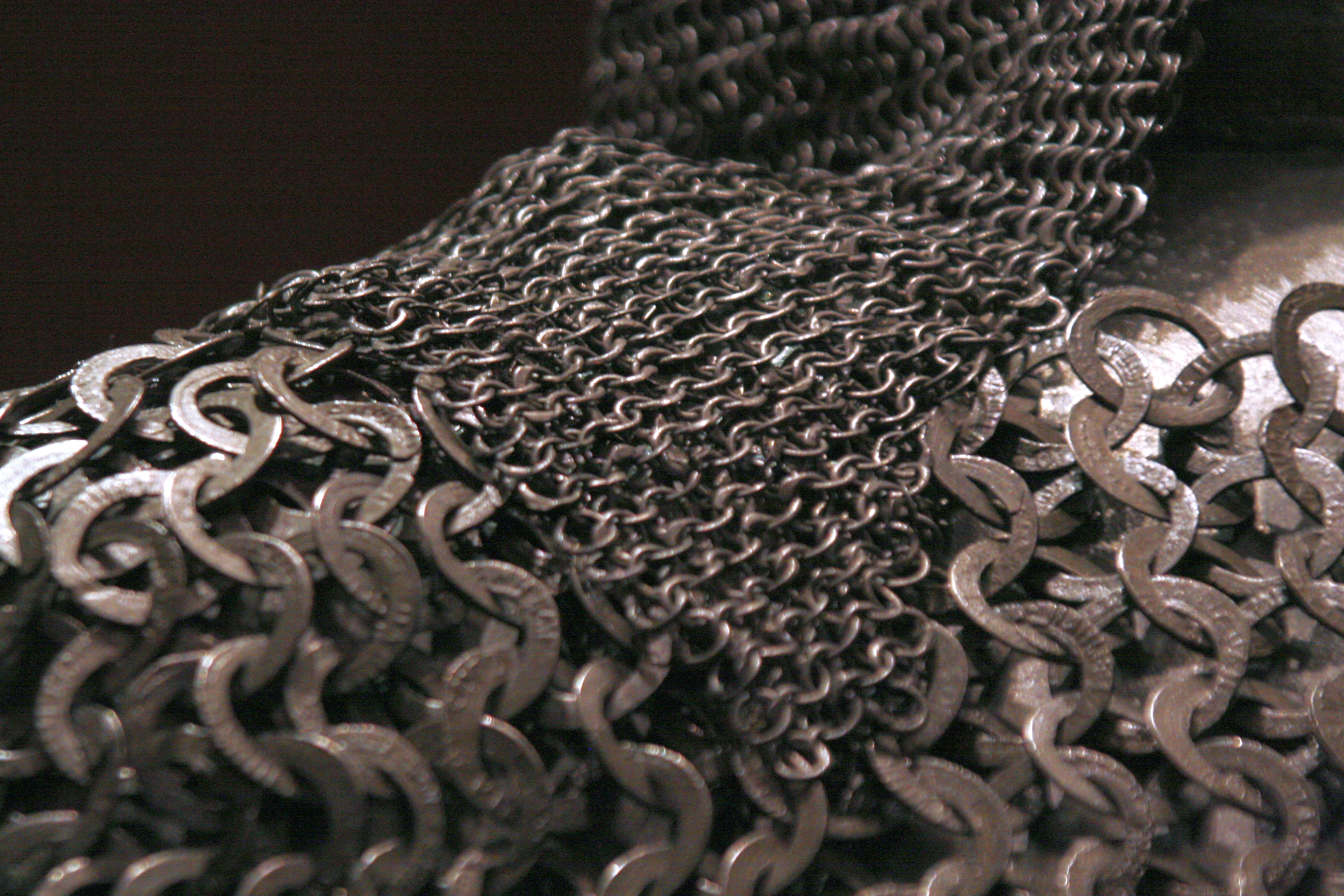
Godunov's armour (detail), Kremlin Armoury

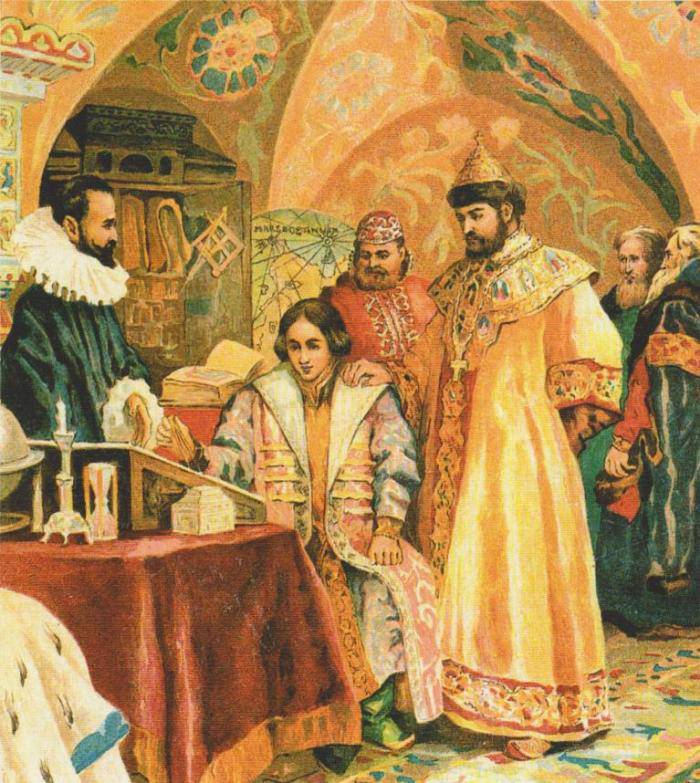
Boris Godunov Overseeing the Studies of his Son, painting by N. Nekrasov (19th century)

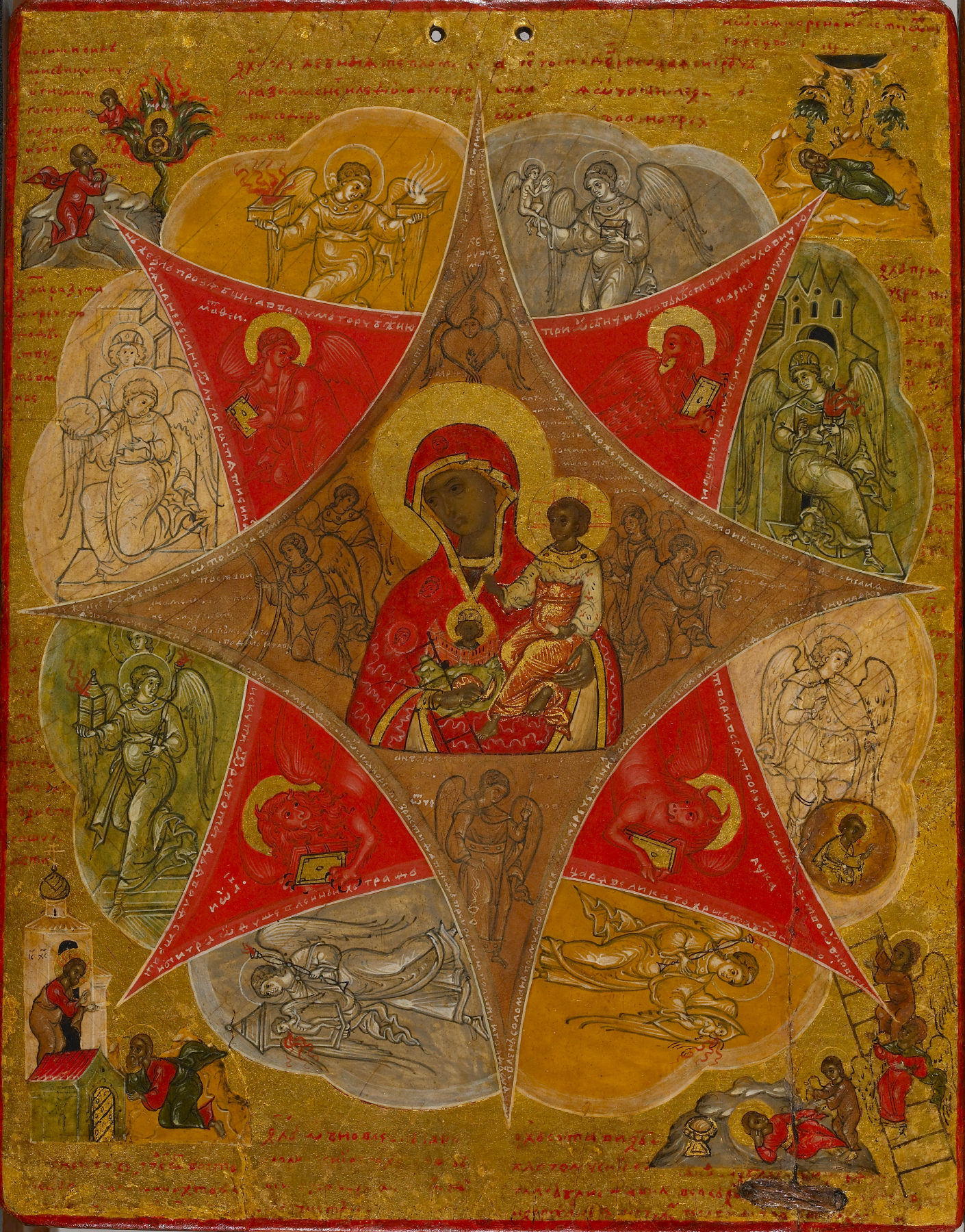
Presentation of the Virgin in the Temple and the Virgin of the Burning Bush, an icon likely commissioned by Boris Godunov (Walters Art Museum)

== See also ==
- Bibliography of Russian history (1223–1613)
- Family tree of Russian monarchs

Regnal titles
Preceded by Feodor I	Tsar of Russia; 1598–1605	Succeeded by Feodor II
