= Malyuta Skuratov =

Russian executioner (d. 1573)

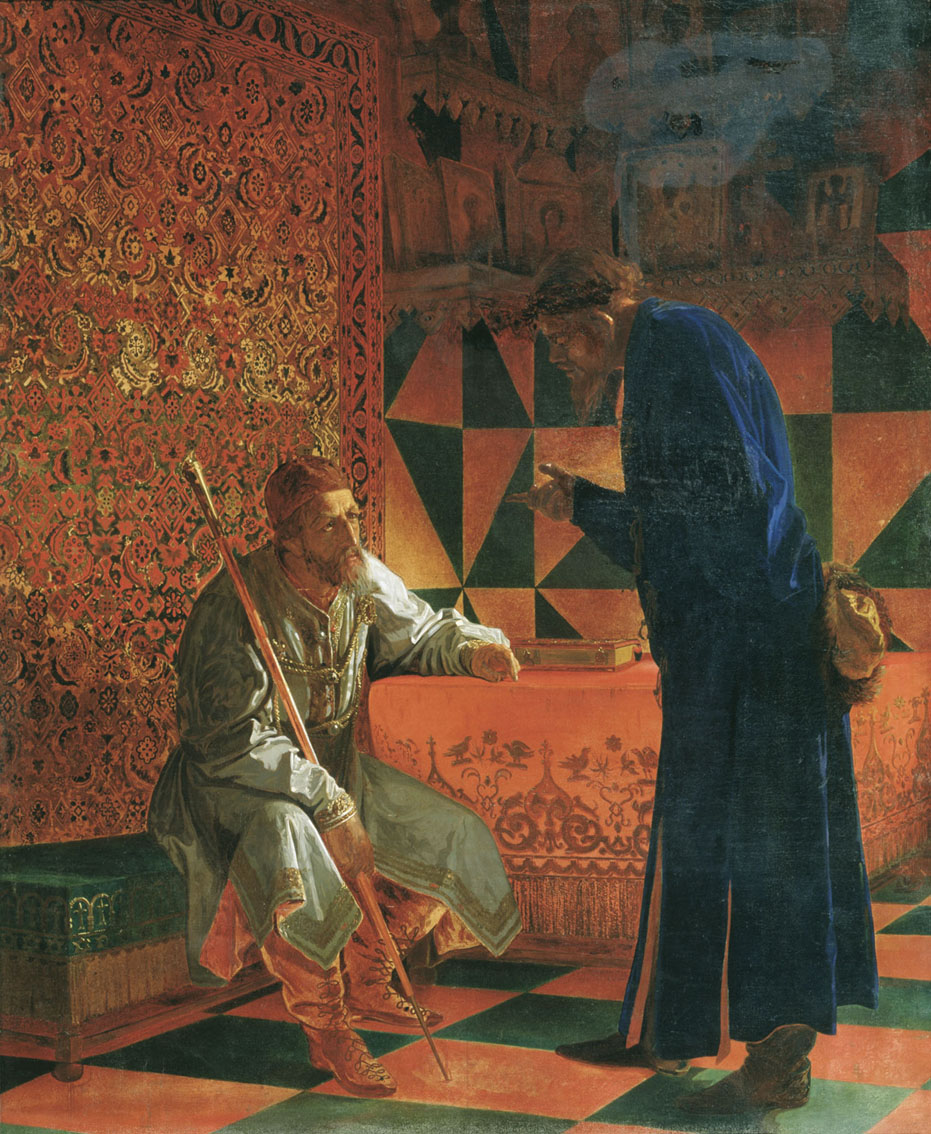
Ivan the Terrible and Malyuta Skuratov, by Grigory Sedov

Grigory Lukyanovich Skuratov-Belskiy (Russian: Григорий Лукьянович Скуратов-Бельский), better known as Malyuta Skuratov (Малюта Скуратов) (? – January 1, 1573) was one of the leaders of the Oprichnina during the reign of Ivan the Terrible.

== Biography ==
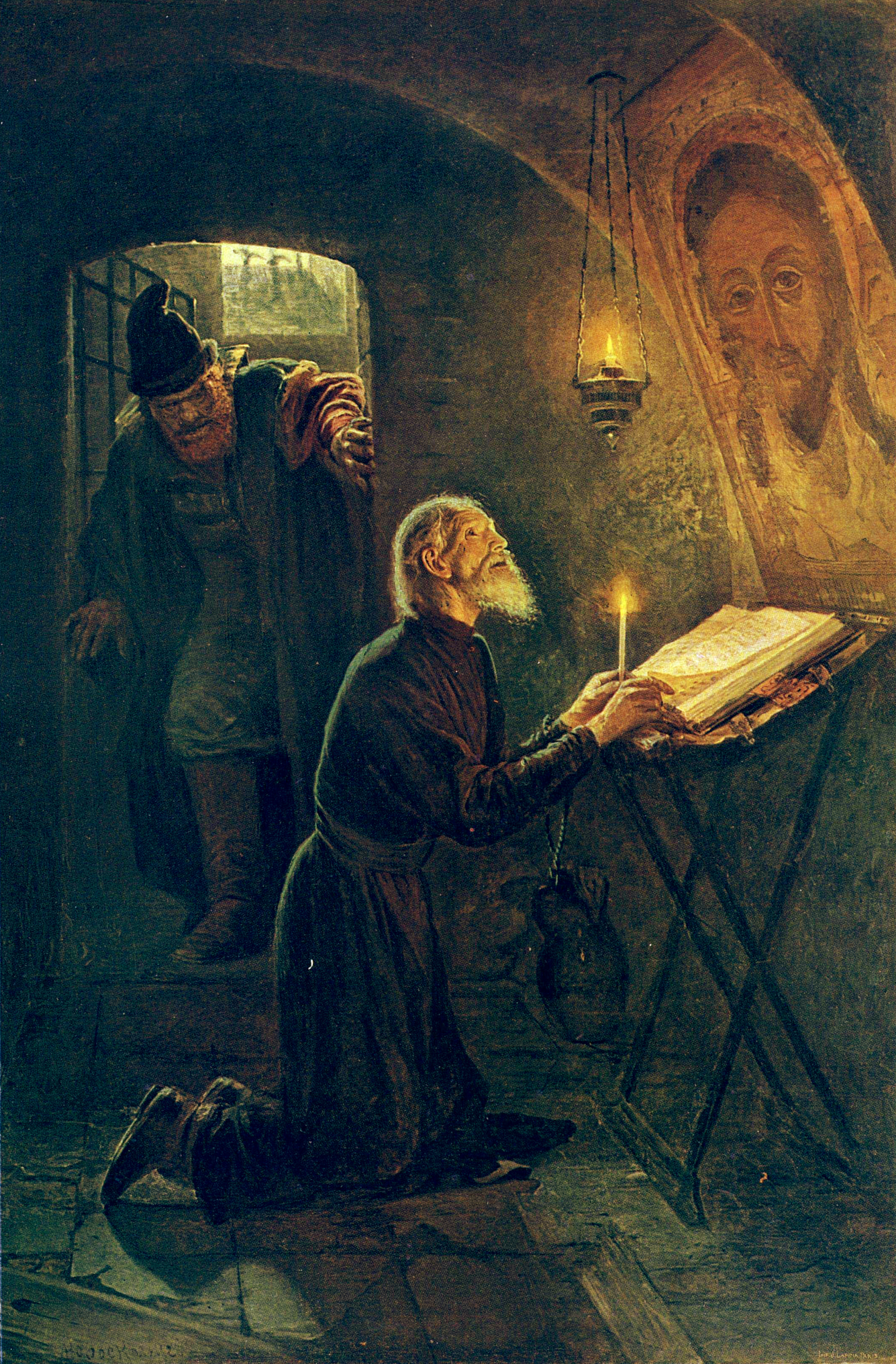
Malyuta Skuratov approaches Philip II in order to kill him

Malyuta Skuratov rose to prominence in 1569 for his role in the trial and execution of Prince Vladimir of Staritsa, Ivan IV's only cousin and a possible claimant to the throne of the Tsardom of Russia.

In December 1569, by order of Ivan the Terrible, Malyuta Skuratov strangled a former Metropolitan of Moscow, Philip II (in office: 1566–1568) for his criticism of the Oprichnina.

In January 1571 Skuratov led a punitive expedition against Novgorod, killing thousands of its citizens on suspicion of treason. In 1571 Skuratov was put in charge of the investigation into the causes of the Russian army's defeat by the army of the Crimean Khan Devlet I Giray.

Malyuta Skuratov was killed during the siege of Weissenstein (present-day Paide in Estonia) in the Livonian War in 1573. He lies buried near the grave of his father Lukian Afanasyevich Belskiy (Russian: Лукьян Афанасьевич Бельский) in the Joseph-Volokolamsk Monastery.

One of Skuratov's daughters, Maria Grigorievna, married the boyar Boris Godunov in 1570 and thus became Tsaritsa as the consort of Godunov in 1598. His other daughter, Yekaterina Grigorievna Shuiskaya, who poisoned Mikhail Skopin-Shuisky in 1610, married Prince Dmitry Ivanovich Skopin-Shuisky in 1572.

== Media ==
=== Movies ===
- The Wings of a Serf (1927; portrayed by Ivan Kachalov)
- Ivan the Terrible (1944/1958; portrayed by Mikhail Zharov)
- Tsar Ivan the Terrible (1991; portrayed by Andrey Martynov)
- Tsar (2009; portrayed by Yury Kuznetsov)

=== Literature ===
- The Master and Margarita by Mikhail Bulgakov: in the chapter entitled "Satan's Great Ball", Bulgakov makes a passing but arguably important reference to the figure of Skuratov.
