= Xenia Borisovna of Russia =

Russian tsarevna

Xenia Borisovna
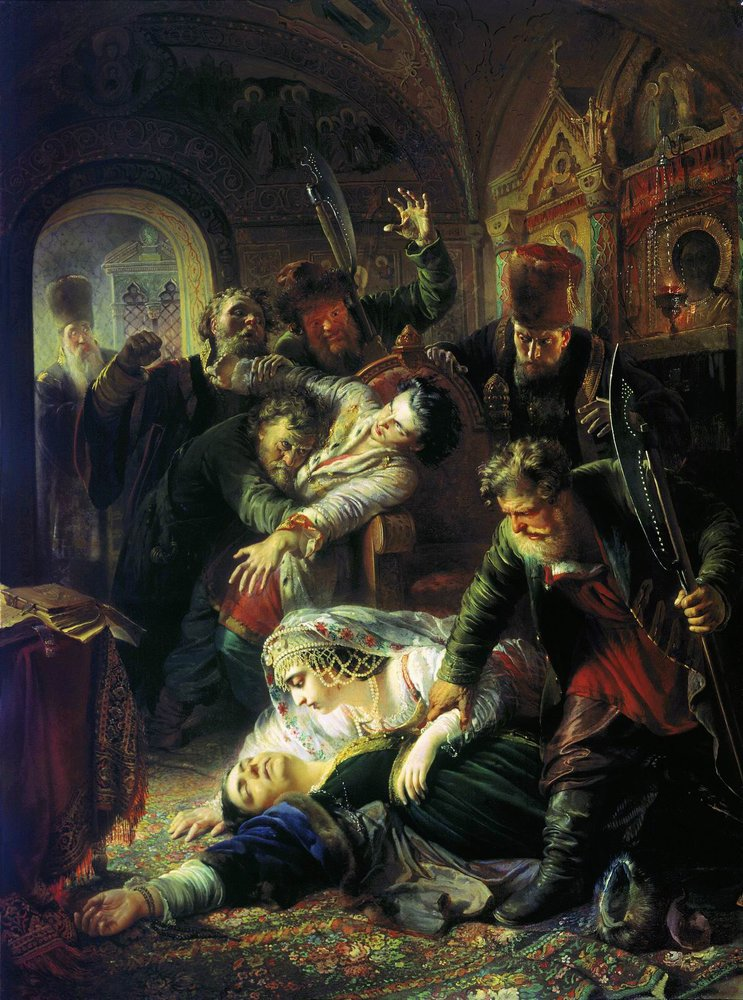
- K.Makovski. False Dmitry's agents murdering Feodor Godunov and his mother. Ksenia is above her mother's body.
- Born: 1582
- Died: 30 August [O.S. 20 August] 1622 (aged 40); Trinity Lavra of St. Sergius
- Burial: Godunov Mausoleum in front of the Cathedral of the Assumption at the Trinity Lavra of St. Sergius
- House: House of Godunov
- Father: Boris Godunov
- Mother: Maria Grigorievna Skuratova-Belskaya

Xenia Borisovna Godunova (Russian: Ксения Борисовна Годунова) (1582–1622) was a Russian Tsarevna, daughter of Tsar Boris Godunov, and sister of Tsar Feodor II of Russia.

== Life ==
She was described as very beautiful and well educated, with an average height, a white and ruddy face, with black wavy hair and large black eyes. Among her fiancés were:

- Prince Gustav of Sweden, who arrived in Moscow in 1600, but the engagement was broken because of his dissolute life.
- John, Prince of Schleswig-Holstein, arrived in 1602, but fell ill and died before the marriage.

Xenia remained a maiden until her father's death in 1605, when her brother Feodor became a Tsar. Some months later, when the Time of Troubles started, her mother and her brother, Feodor, were killed by order of False Dmitry I.

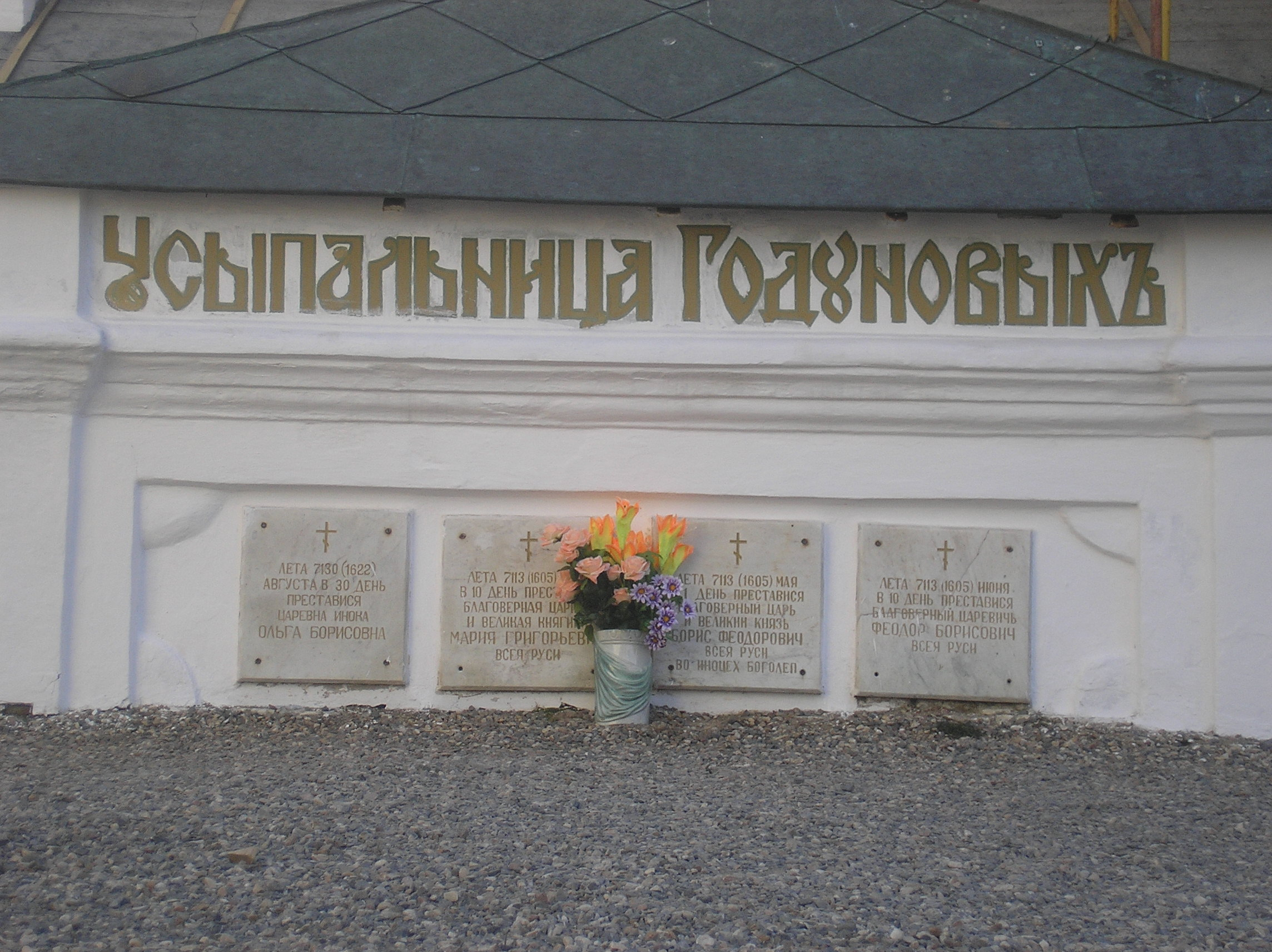
Godunov Mausoleum in front of the Cathedral of the Assumption at the Trinity Lavra of St. Sergius where Xenia's name is inscribed on the leftmost plaque as "the Nun Olga Borisovna".

She was spared, but False Dmitry raped her and kept her in his palace as a concubine for five months. Before the arrival of his bride Marina Mniszech, Xenia was sent to the Voskresensky Monastery in Beloozero and forced to take monastic vows, whereupon she was given the name "Olga". Subsequently, she was transferred to the Assumption Princess Monastery in Vladimir. According to one account, she was pregnant and bore a son of False Dmitry in the monastery.

In 1606 she sojourned to the Trinity Lavra of St. Sergius to attend the reburial of her father; vestments she sewed as a nun are on display at that Lavra.

From 1608 to 1610, the monastery was besieged by the Polish-Lithuanian alliance, but a Russian army ultimately cleared the siege.

Her name is inscribed as "Nun Olga Borisovna" at the crypt of the Godunovs near the entrance of the Assumption Cathedral at Trinity-St. Sergius Lavra where she is buried with her parents and brother.

== In the arts ==
She is one of the characters in Mussorgsky's opera Boris Godunov, but plays only a minor role in the story.

She also appears in Antonín Dvořák's opera Dimitrij, where the False Dmitry and her relationship to him is portrayed in a more sympathetic light. The opera is only loosely based on the historical account; she is murdered on Marina Mniszech's orders rather than sent to the monastic life.

A fictionalized dramatization of her life during the time of troubles appeared in the Russian film 1612, where she was played by actress Violetta Davydovskaya.
