= Feodor II of Russia =

Tsar of Russia in 1605

Feodor II
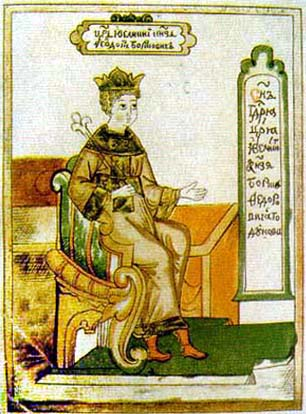
- The earliest depiction of Feodor II, mid-17th century

Tsar of all Russia
- Reign: 23 April [O.S. 13 April] 1605 – 20 June [O.S. 10 June] 1605
- Predecessor: Boris Godunov
- Successor: False Dmitry I
- Born: 1589; Moscow, Russia
- Died: 20 June [O.S. 10 June] 1605 (aged 15–16); Moscow, Russia
- Burial: 1605; reburied 1606; Varsonofy monastery, Moscow; reburied 1606 in Troitse-Sergiyeva Lavra (a separate Godunov Vault since 1783)
Names
- Feodor Borisovich Godunov
- Dynasty: Godunov
- Father: Boris Godunov
- Mother: Maria Skuratova-Belskaya
- Religion: Russian Orthodox

Feodor II Borisovich Godunov (Russian: Фёдор II Борисович Годунов, romanized: Fyodor II Borisovich Godunov; 1589 – 20 June [O.S. 10 June] 1605) was Tsar of all Russia from April to June 1605, during the Time of Troubles.

== Life ==
Fyodor II was born in Moscow, the son and successor to Boris Godunov. His mother Maria Grigorievna Skuratova-Belskaya was one of the daughters of Malyuta Skuratov, the infamous favourite of Ivan the Terrible.

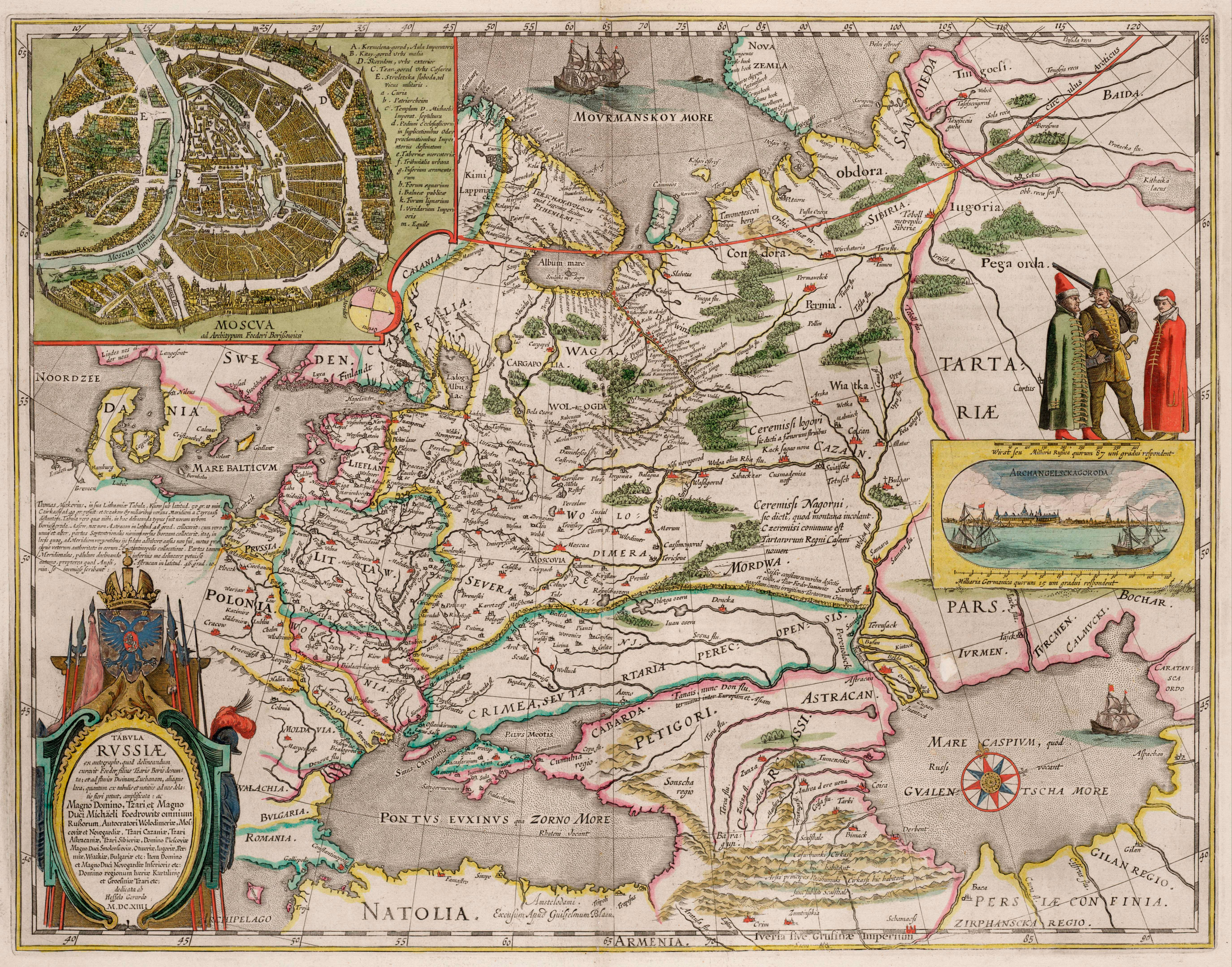
Feodor Godunov's map of Russia, as published by Hessel Gerritsz

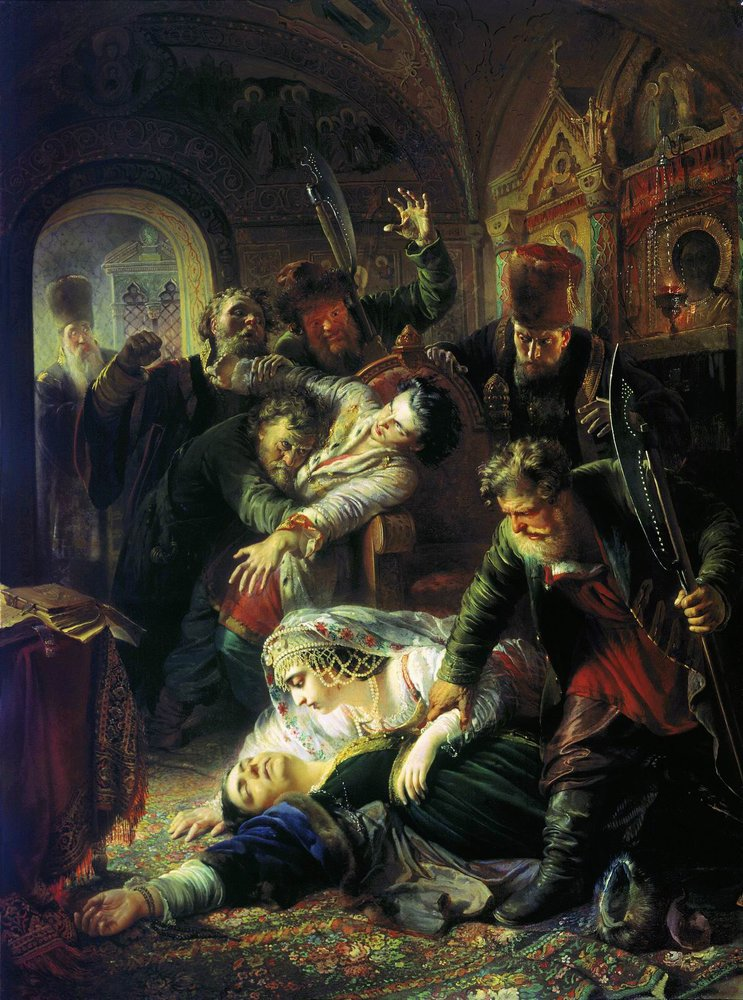
False Dmitry's Agents Murdering Feodor Godunov and his Mother, by Konstantin Makovsky (1862), Tretyakov Gallery, Moscow

Physically robust and passionately beloved by his father, he received the best education available at that time, and from childhood was initiated into all the minutiae of government, besides sitting regularly in the council and receiving the foreign envoys. He seems also to have been remarkably and precociously intelligent, creating a map of Russia, which is still preserved. It was edited with some additions by Hessel Gerritsz in Amsterdam, in 1613, and had been reedited until 1665.

On the sudden death of Boris the sixteen-year-old was proclaimed tsar (13 April 1605). Though his father had taken the precaution to surround him with powerful friends, he lived from the first moment of his reign in an atmosphere of treachery. On 11 June (N. S.) 1605 the envoys of False Dmitriy I arrived at Moscow to demand his removal, and the letters that they read publicly in Red Square decided his fate. A group of boyars, unwilling to swear allegiance to the new tsar, seized control of the Kremlin and arrested him.

On June 10 or 20, Feodor was strangled in his apartment, together with his mother. Officially, they were declared to have poisoned themselves as an act of suicide, but the Swedish diplomat Peter Petreius stated that the bodies, which had been on public display, showed traces of a violent struggle. Although aged 16, Feodor was known to be physically strong and agile, and it took four men to overpower him.

== See also ==
- Bibliography of Russian history (1223–1613)
- Tsars of Russia family tree

Regnal titles
| Preceded by Boris I | Tsar of Russia; 1605 | Succeeded by Dmitriy I |
