= Maria Skuratova-Belskaya =

Maria Grigorievna

Tsaritsa of Russia
- Tenure: 11 February 1598 – 10 June 1605
- Predecessor: Irina Godunova
- Successor: Marina Mniszech
- Born: c. 1552
- Died: 10/20 June 1605 (aged c. 53); Moscow, Russia
- Burial: Trinity Lavra of St. Sergius
- Spouse: Boris Godunov
- Issue: Xenia Borisovna; Feodor II of Russia
- House: Skuratova-Belskaya (by birth); House of Godunov (by marriage)
- Father: Malyuta Skuratov
- Mother: Matryona

Maria Grigorievna Skuratova-Belskaya (c. 1552 – died 10/20 June 1605) was a Tsaritsa of Russia as the wife of Tsar Boris Godunov. She served as regent of Russia during the minority of her son, Tsar Feodor II of Russia, in 1605.

== Life ==
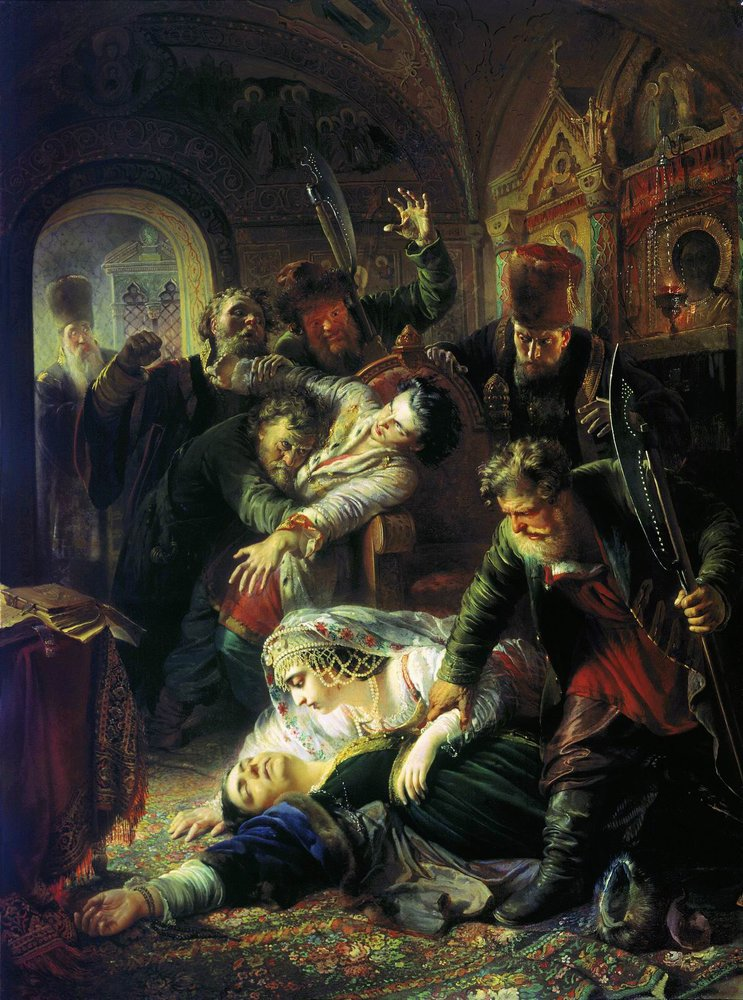
False Dmitry's Agents Murdering Feodor Godunov and his Mother, by Konstantin Makovsky (1862). Tretyakov Gallery, Moscow.

Maria Skuratova-Belskaya was the daughter of Tsar Ivan the Terrible's favorite, Malyuta Skuratov-Belskiy. In 1570, she married Boris Godunov. The marriage was reportedly arranged because Godunov wished to strengthen his position at court by becoming the son-in-law of the Tsar's favorite.

In 1598, her husband became Tsar of Russia, making her Tsaritsa. During her tenure as tsarina, Maria Feodorovna Pozharskaya was her favorite and reportedly exerted influence over her. Upon the death of her husband in April 1605, her son was proclaimed Tsar. As he was a minor, a regency was needed to govern Russia during his minority, and Maria Skuratova-Belskaya was proclaimed regent. Her regency, and that of her son, was however only to last for a couple of months.

On 10/20 June 1605, she was strangled with her son Feodor in his apartment.

== Issue ==
Boris and Maria had two children:

1. Tsarevna Xenia Borisovna
2. Tsar Feodor II of Russia

Russian royalty
| Vacant Title last held by Irina Godunova | Tsaritsa of Russia; 1598–1605 | Vacant Title next held by Marina Mniszech |
