= Anna of Russia (disambiguation) =

Anna of Russia (1693–1740) was the ruler of Russia from 1730 until her death in 1740.

Anna of Russia may also refer to:

- Anne of Kiev (1024/32–1075), daughter of Yaroslav I the Wise; wife of Henry I of France
- Anna of Moscow (1393–1417), daughter of Vasily I of Moscow; wife of John VIII Palaiologos
- Anna Koltovskaya (bef. 1572–1626), fourth wife of Ivan IV of Russia
- Anna Vasilchikova (died 1577), fifth wife of Ivan IV of Russia
- Tsarevna Anastasia Vasilievna of Russia (born 1609), daughter of Vasili IV of Russia
- Tsarevna Anna Mikhailovna of Russia (1630–1692), daughter of Michael I of Russia
- Grand Duchess Anna Petrovna of Russia (1708–1728), daughter of Peter I of Russia; wife of Charles Frederick, Duke of Holstein-Gottorp; and mother of Peter III of Russia
- Grand Duchess Anna Leopoldovna of Russia (1718–1746), mother and regent of Ivan VI of Russia; born Elisabeth Katharina Christine of Mecklenburg-Schwerin
- Grand Duchess Anna Petrovna of Russia (1757–1759), daughter of Peter III of Russia
- Grand Duchess Anna Pavlovna of Russia (1795–1865), daughter of Paul I of Russia; wife of William II of the Netherlands
- Princess Juliane of Saxe-Coburg-Saalfeld (1781–1860), daughter of Francis, Duke of Saxe-Coburg-Saalfeld; wife of Grand Duke Constantine Pavlovich of Russia as Grand Duchess Anna Feodorovna of Russia
- Grand Duchess Anna Mikhailovna of Russia (1834–1836), daughter of Grand Duke Michael Pavlovich of Russia
