= Grigory Sedov =

Russian painter

- Григорий Семенович Седов
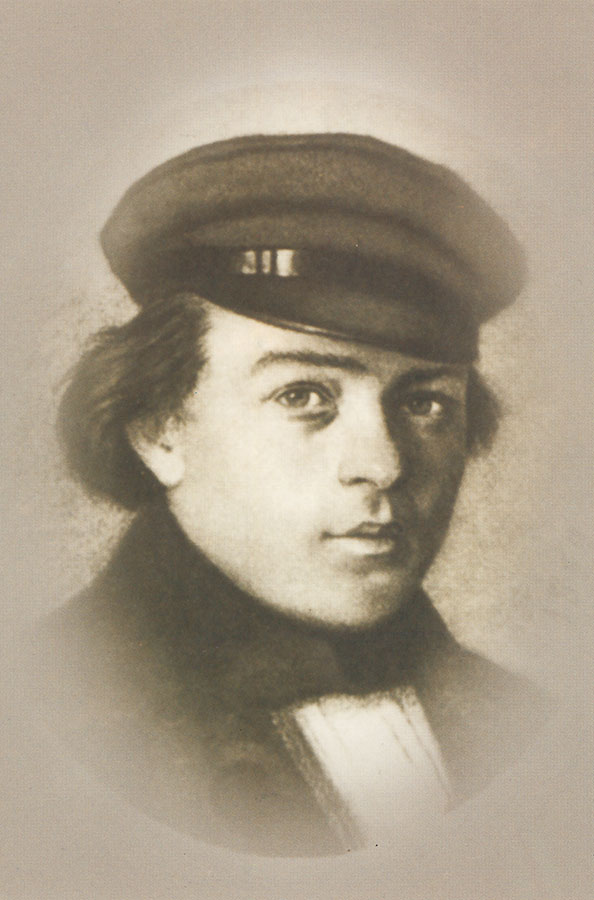
- Sedov; portrait by Ivan Shishkin (1859)
- Born: January 12, 1836; Moscow
- Died: April 15, 1884 (aged 48); Moscow
- Education: Member Academy of Arts (1870)
- Alma mater: Moscow School of Painting, Sculpture and Architecture; Imperial Academy of Arts (1866)
- Known for: Painting
- Awards: Big Gold Medal of the Imperial Academy of Arts (1866)

Grigory Semyonovich Sedov (Russian: Григорий Семёнович Седов; (12 January 1836, Moscow - 15 April 1884, Moscow) was a Russian Imperial painter; known primarily for historical scenes and religious murals.

== Biography ==
He was born to a family of merchants. His first art studies were at the Moscow School of Painting, Sculpture and Architecture, followed by enrollment at the Imperial Academy of Arts in 1857. While there, he received several medals for his work, including gold medals in 1864 and 1866, when he was also awarded the title of "Artist", first-class, and given a stipend to study abroad for six years for his depiction of the Grand Duchy of Vladimir being converted to Christianity.

From 1867 to 1870, he lived in Paris, where he not only painted oils but also created a mural of the Holy Trinity for the altar dome at the new Alexander Nevsky Cathedral. During that time, he also went blind in one eye. Combined with his inability to master the French language, this made his life there too difficult.

In 1870, he returned to Russia and spent the last three years of his stipend period working in Moscow; mostly painting for churches. He was also named an "Academician" for his portrayal of Ivan the Terrible with Malyuta Skuratov. In 1876, his painting of Ivan with Vasilisa Melentyeva won him critical acclaim at an Academy exhibition. Later, he painted a "Baptism of Saint Olga" for the Cathedral of Christ the Saviour. His eye problems prevented him from working for long periods and his total output is relatively small.

== Selected paintings ==
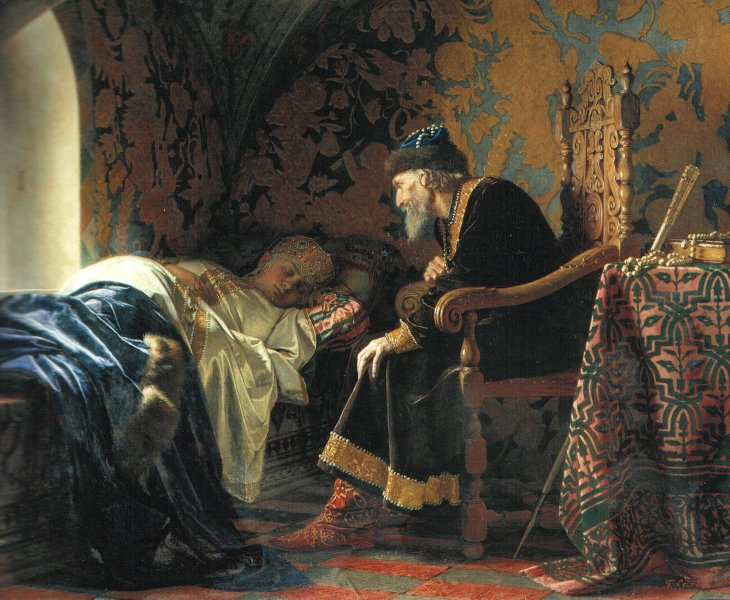
Ivan the Terrible, admiring Vasilisa Melentyeva

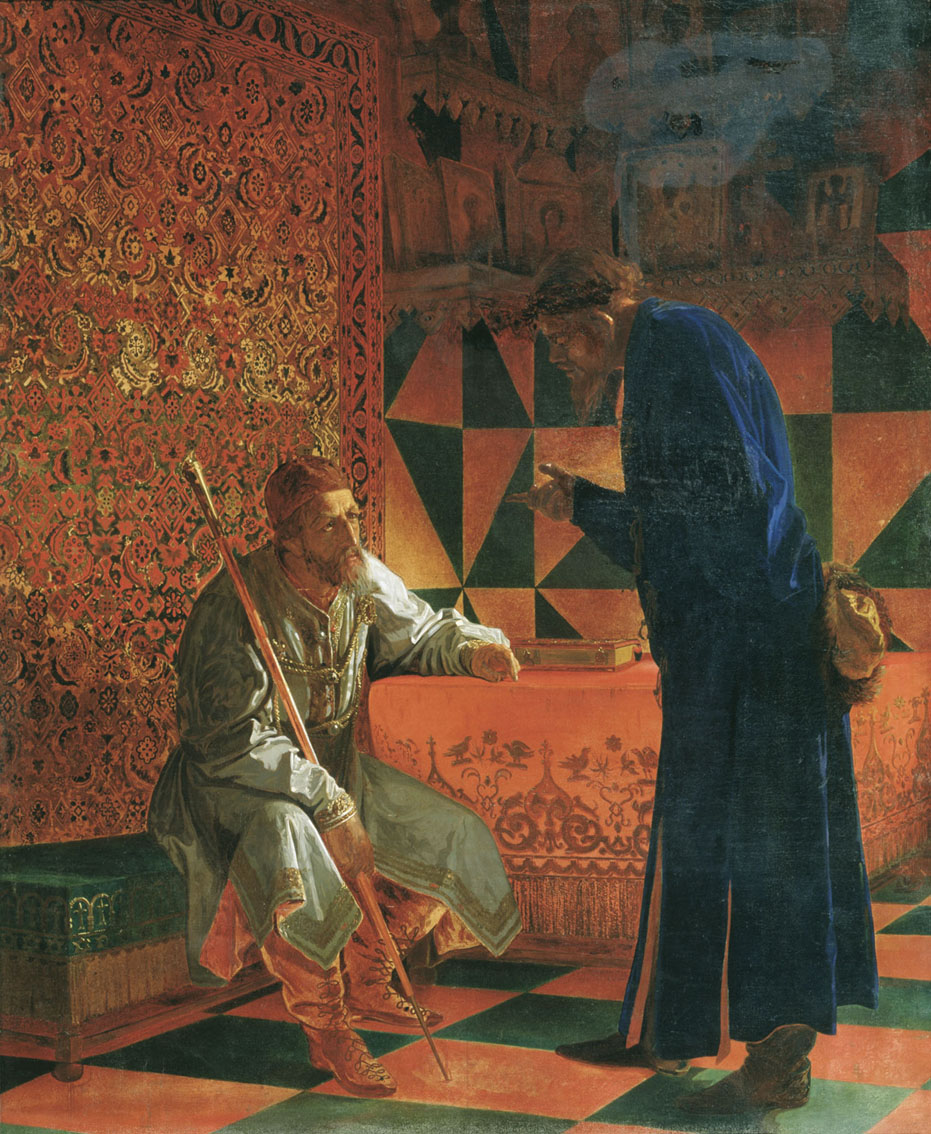
Ivan the Terrible and Skuratov

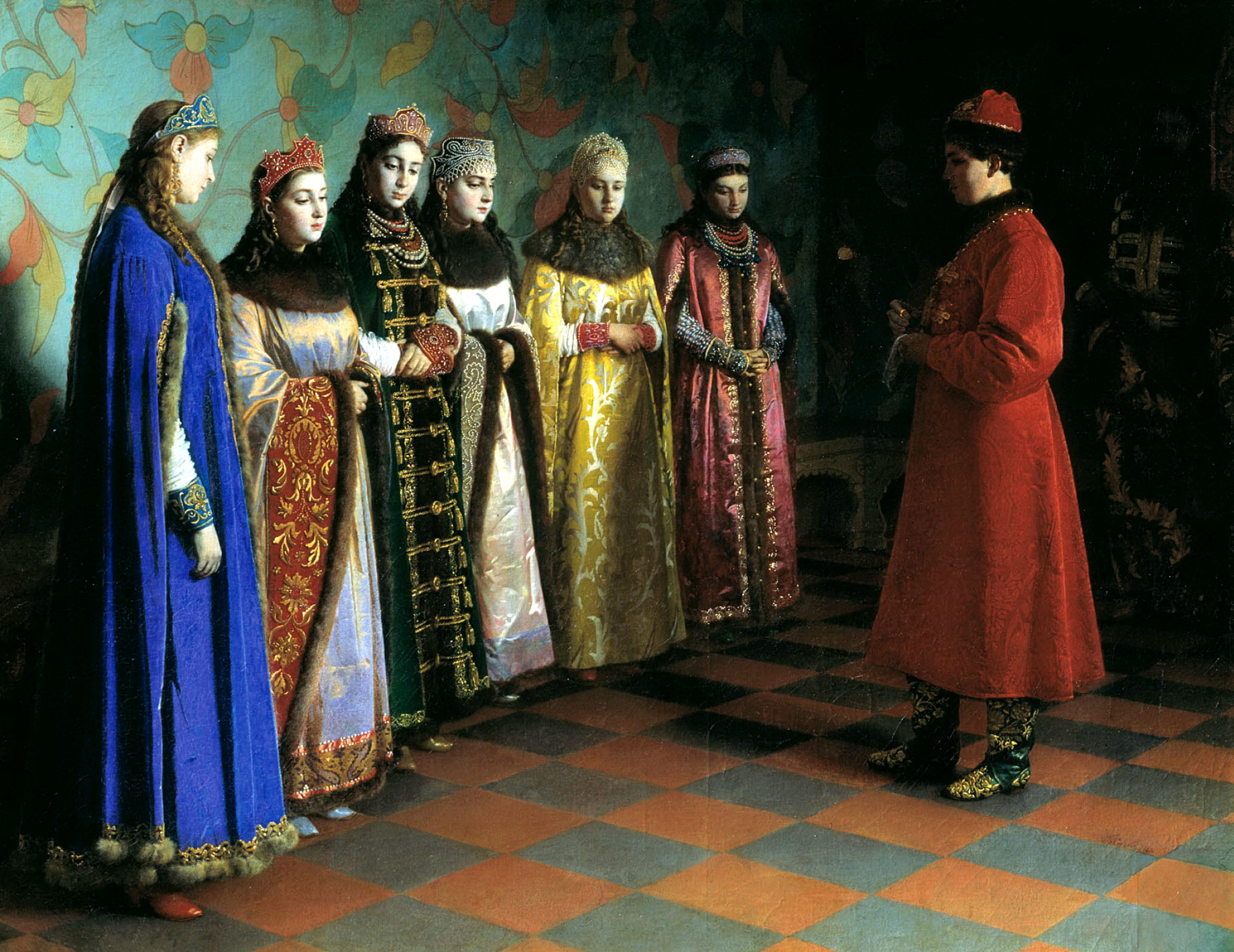
Tsar Alexei Mikhailovich
Choosing a Bride

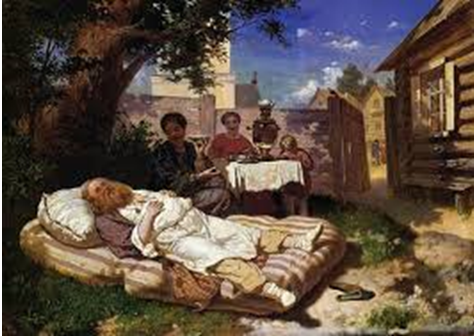
On a Hot Day
