= Feodosiya Solovaya =

Feodosiya or Praskovia Mikhailovna Solovaya (Russian: Феодосия Михайловна Соловая; died 1621) was a Russian noblewoman, Tsesarevna of Russia as the second spouse of Tsarevich Ivan Ivanovich of Russia, son of Ivan the Terrible.

She was the daughter of Mikhail Timofeevich Petrov, a nobleman from the Ryazan region, and belonged to the noble clan later known as Petrovo-Solovovo. In 1574, she was selected by the tsar to marry his son. As she was childless, Ivan the Terrible forced their divorce (in 1579) and had her take monastic vows in the Intercession Convent of Suzdal.
