= Yevdokiya Saburova =

Eudoxia Saburova (Russian: Евдокия Богдановна Сабурова; died 1620) was a Russian noblewoman, Tsesarevna of Russia as the first spouse of Tsarevich Ivan Ivanovich of Russia, son of Ivan the Terrible.

== Biography ==
She was the daughter of Bogdan Y. Saburov, who became a Boyar when his daughter was selected as a royal wife. In 1571, she participated in the Bride-show arranged to select a wife to Tsar Ivan, and while she was not chosen by the tsar for his wife, he did select her to marry his son. In 1572, her father-in-law divorced her from his son and placed her in the Pokrovsky convent in Suzdal for childlessness.
