= Yelena Sheremeteva =

Russian noblewoman

Yelena Ivanovna Sheremeteva (c. 1553 – 4 January 1587) was a Russian noblewoman, tsesarevna of Russia as the third wife of Tsarevich Ivan Ivanovich of Russia, son of Ivan the Terrible.

== Biography ==
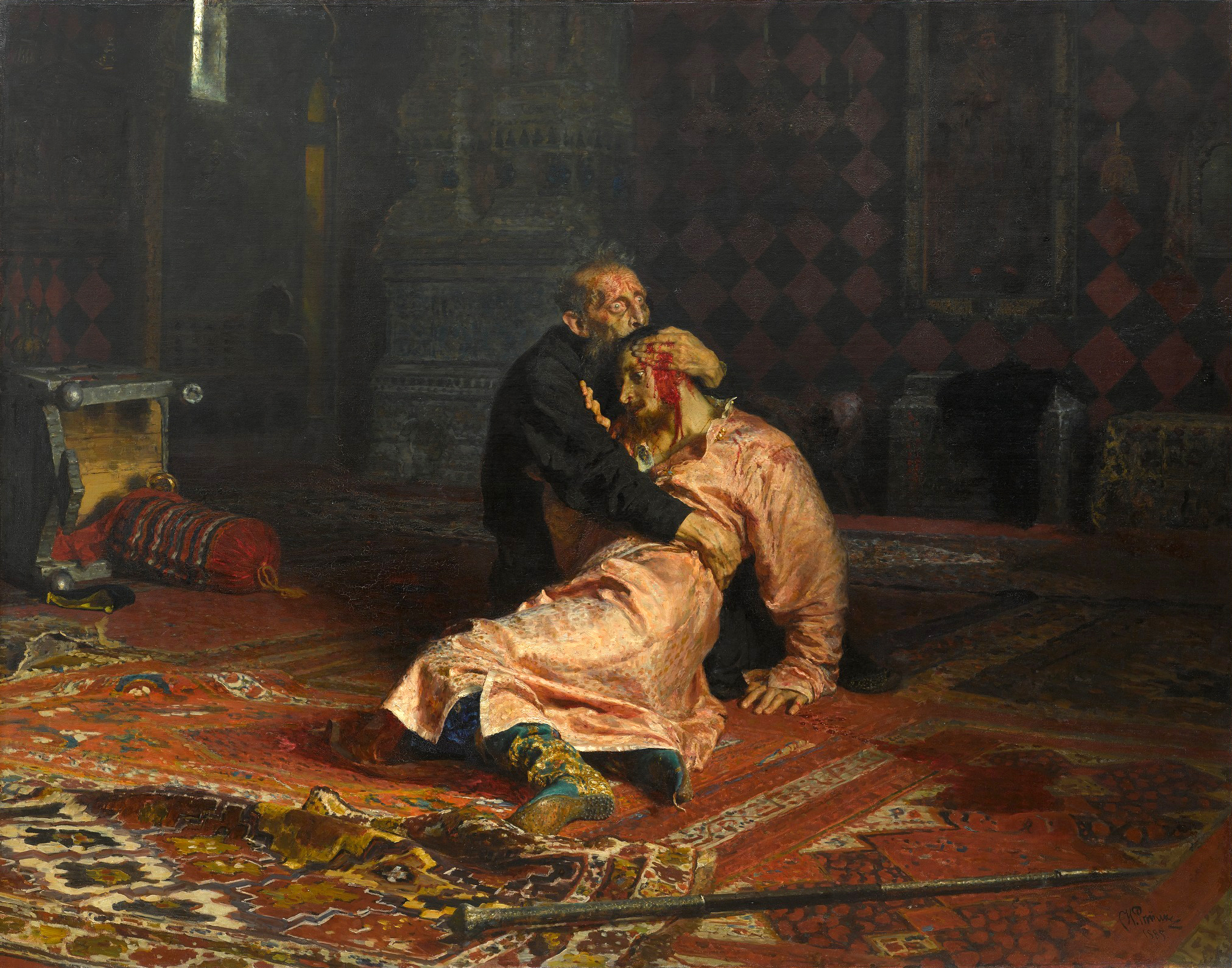
The wounded Ivan being cradled by his father in Ivan the Terrible and His Son Ivan, 1885 painting by Ilya Repin (Tretyakov Gallery, Moscow)

Yelena Sheremeteva was the daughter of the boyar Ivan Vasilyevich Men'Shoi Sheremetev. She was selected to marry the son of the tsar in a bride-show of daughters from the nobility. Before her marriage to the Tsarevich, his father had considered many women as a possible wife for his son, but had found most of them unsuitable for one reason or another. The young Ivan's first and second wives were both thrown into convents on account of their apparent inability to have children.

In October 1581, Yelena was found to be pregnant. However, according to legend, on 15 November, the Tsar accused her of supposedly wearing immodest clothing and he began to beat her. Subsequently, Yelena suffered a miscarriage.

Supposedly, the Tsarevich Ivan soon confronted his father on the matter, and a heated argument ensued and only ended when the Tsar struck his son on the head with his staff. The Tsarevich died of his wound on 19 November 1581, leaving Yelena a widow.

After the death of her spouse, her father-in-law placed her in the Novodevichy Convent. Here, she took the name Leonida. However, unlike her two predecessors, she was not exiled far away from Moscow, but placed in a convent near the court, where she was treated in accordance to her status as a member of the imperial family.
