= Marfa Sobakina =

Tsaritsa of Russia in 1571

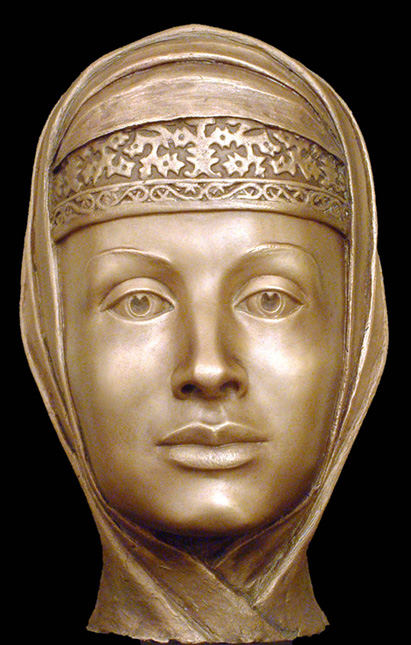
- Forensic facial reconstruction

Tsaritsa consort of all Russia
- Tenure: 28 October 1571 – 13 November 1571
- Born: 1552
- Died: 13 November 1571 (aged 18–19)
- Burial: Ascension Convent, Kolomenskoye; Archangel Cathedral, Kremlin (1929)
- Spouse: Ivan IV of Russia (m. 1571)
Names
- Marfa Vasilevna Sobakina
- Dynasty: Rurik (by marriage)
- Father: Vasiliy Sobakin

Marfa Vasilyevna Sobakina (Russian: Марфа Васильевна Собакина; 1552 – 13 November 1571) was the tsaritsa of Russia as the third wife of Ivan the Terrible, the tsar of all Russia, from October 1571 until her death the next month.

== Life ==
The daughter of a Novgorod-based merchant, Vasiliy Sobakin, Marfa was selected by Ivan among twelve marriage finalists. A few days after her selection, Marfa began to succumb to a mysterious ailment. It was rumoured that she was unintentionally poisoned by her mother, who gave her a potion supposedly meant to increase her fertility. Despite rapidly losing weight and barely standing, Marfa was nonetheless married to Ivan on 28 October 1571 in Aleksandrovska Sloboda. Marfa died sixteen days later.

Her death increased her husband's paranoia, because she died in what was meant to be an impregnable fortress filled with loyal subjects. Ivan, remembering the death of his first wife, immediately suspected poison and put to death many of his subjects, including Mikail Temrjuk (brother to the Tsar's previous wife) who was impaled. Marfa was a cousin to Malyuta Skuratov.

== Legacy ==
The story of Marfa's selection and death is the base of the historical verse drama The Tsar's Bride by Lev Mei. The opera by the same name by Nikolai Rimsky-Korsakov is repertory opera in Russia.

Russian royalty
Vacant Title last held by Maria Temryukovna	Tsaritsa of all Russia; 1571	Vacant Title next held by Anna Koltovskaya
