= Maria Dolgorukaya =

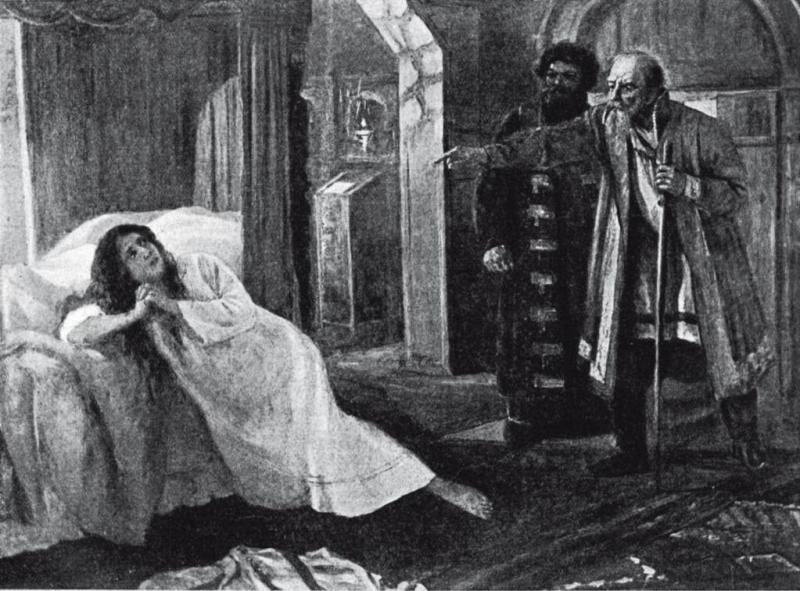
- Ivan the Terrible announces to his seventh wife Maria Dolgorukaya her imminent death

Tsaritsa of All Russia (Disputed existence)
- Tenure: 1580
- Predecessor: Vasilisa Melentyeva (Disputed existence)
- Successor: Maria Nagaya
- Died: 1580
- Spouse: Ivan the Terrible
- Dynasty: Rurik (by marriage)
- Religion: Eastern Orthodox

Maria Dolgorukaya (died 1580) possibly was the seventh wife of Ivan the Terrible, Tsar of Russia. The marriage (unauthorized by the church) may have been celebrated in 1580.

Legend says she did not bear the Tsar any children and was revealed to have a lover after their first night together, when the Tsar discovered she was not a virgin. Ivan subsequently had her drowned.

There is no evidence of her existence in primary sources. The first mention can be found in 19th-century Russian literature. Nikolay Kostomarov in 1866 wrote that the notice about her was found by Afanasiy Byichkov in a manuscript in the Imperial Public Library.

Modern historians now have doubts about whether she existed.

Russian royalty
Vacant Title last held by Vasilisa Melentyeva	Tsaritsa of Russia; 1580	Vacant Title next held by Maria Nagaya
