= Tsarevich Ivan Ivanovich of Russia =

Tsarevich of Russia (1554-1581)

Ivan Ivanovich
- Tsarevich of Russia
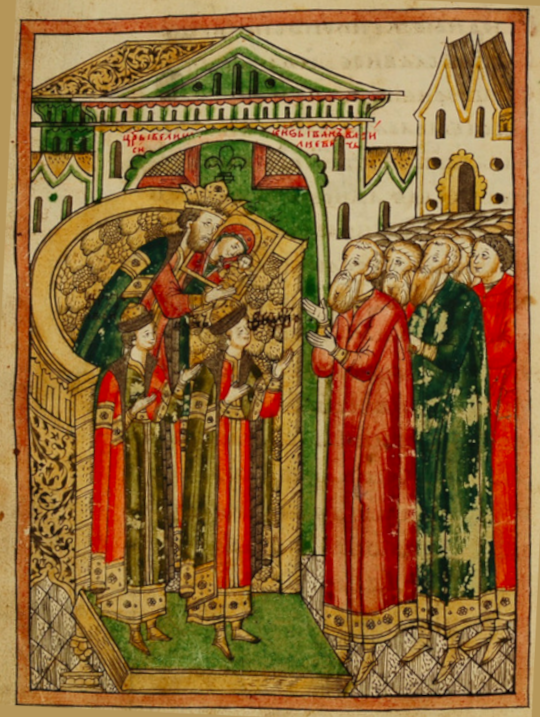
- Ivan IV, tsareviches Ivan and Feodor with the Our Lady of Kazan icon
- Born: 28 March 1554
- Died: 19 November 1581 (aged 27); Alexandrovskaya Sloboda, Russia
- Cause of death: Blunt force trauma to the head with a sceptre
- Burial: Cathedral of the Archangel, Moscow
- Spouses: Eudoxia Saburova (m. 1571; div. 1572) Praskovia Solova (m. 1574; div. 1579) Yelena Sheremeteva (m. 1581)
- Dynasty: Rurik
- Father: Ivan IV of Russia
- Mother: Anastasia Romanovna
- Religion: Russian Orthodox

Ivan Ivanovich (Russian: Иван Иванович; 28 March 1554 – 19 November 1581) was the second son of Russian tsar Ivan the Terrible by his first wife Anastasia Romanovna. He was the tsarevich (heir apparent) until he suddenly died; historians generally believe that his father killed him in a fit of rage.

== Early life ==
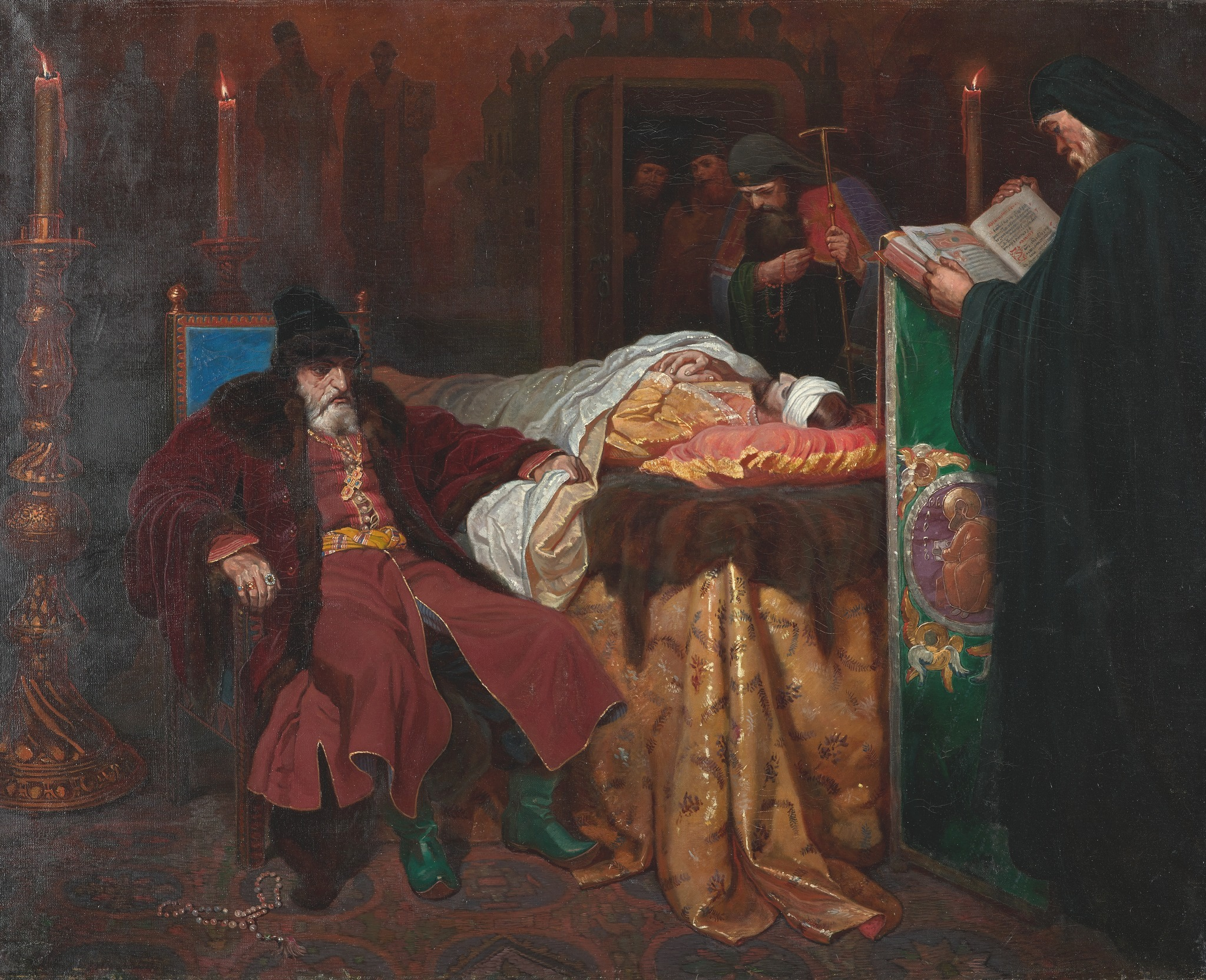
Ivan the Terrible meditating at the deathbed of his son by Vyacheslav Schwarz (1861)

Ivan was the second son of Ivan IV of Russia ("the Terrible") by his first wife Anastasia Romanovna. His brother was Feodor, who would eventually succeed his father as tsar.

The young Ivan accompanied his father during the Massacre of Novgorod at the age of 15. For five weeks, he and his father would watch the oprichniki with enthusiasm and retire to church for prayer. At the age of 27, Ivan was at least as well read as his father, and in his free time, wrote a biography on Antony of Siya. Ivan is reputed to have once saved his father from an assassination attempt. A Livonian prisoner named Bykovski raised a sword against the tsar, only to be rapidly stabbed by the tsarevich.

== Marriages ==
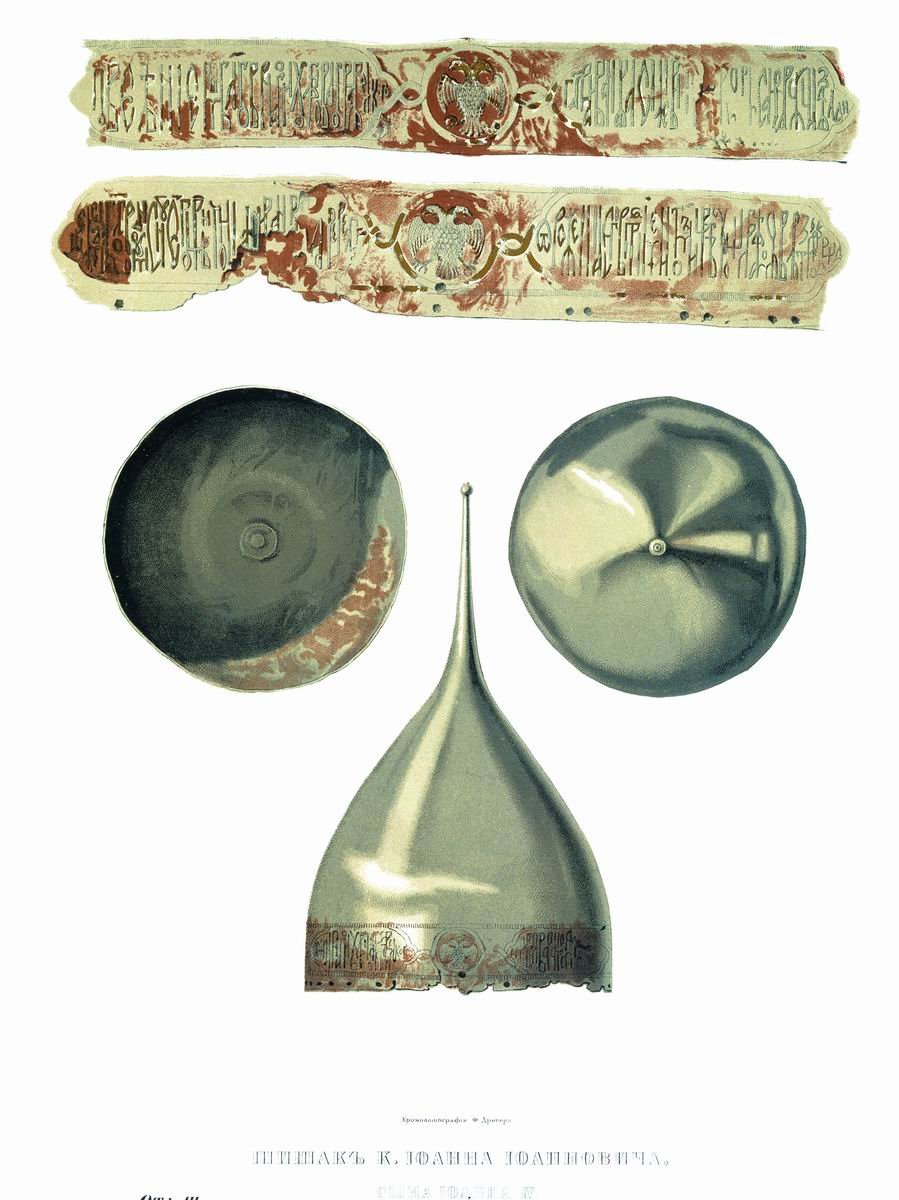
Shlem (helmet) of Ivan Ivanovich, before 1557

In 1566, it was suggested that the 12-year-old Ivan marry Virginia Eriksdotter, the daughter of Eric XIV of Sweden, but this did not come about. At the age of 17, Ivan was betrothed to Eudoxia Saburova, who had previously been proposed as a bride for the tsar. Indeed, she had been one of 12 women paraded before the tsar in a bride-show for him to make a choice. The tsar had rejected Eudoxia as a bride for himself but she was later married to the tsar's son. The tsar wanted his daughter-in-law to produce an heir very quickly, and this did not happen, so the tsar banished her to a convent and found another bride for his son. This second wife was Praskovia Solova, who met quickly with the same fate as her predecessor, and was also put away into a convent. A third wife was found for the young Ivan, Yelena Sheremeteva, who was found to be pregnant in October 1581. That child was presumably miscarried around the time when Ivan died.

== Death ==
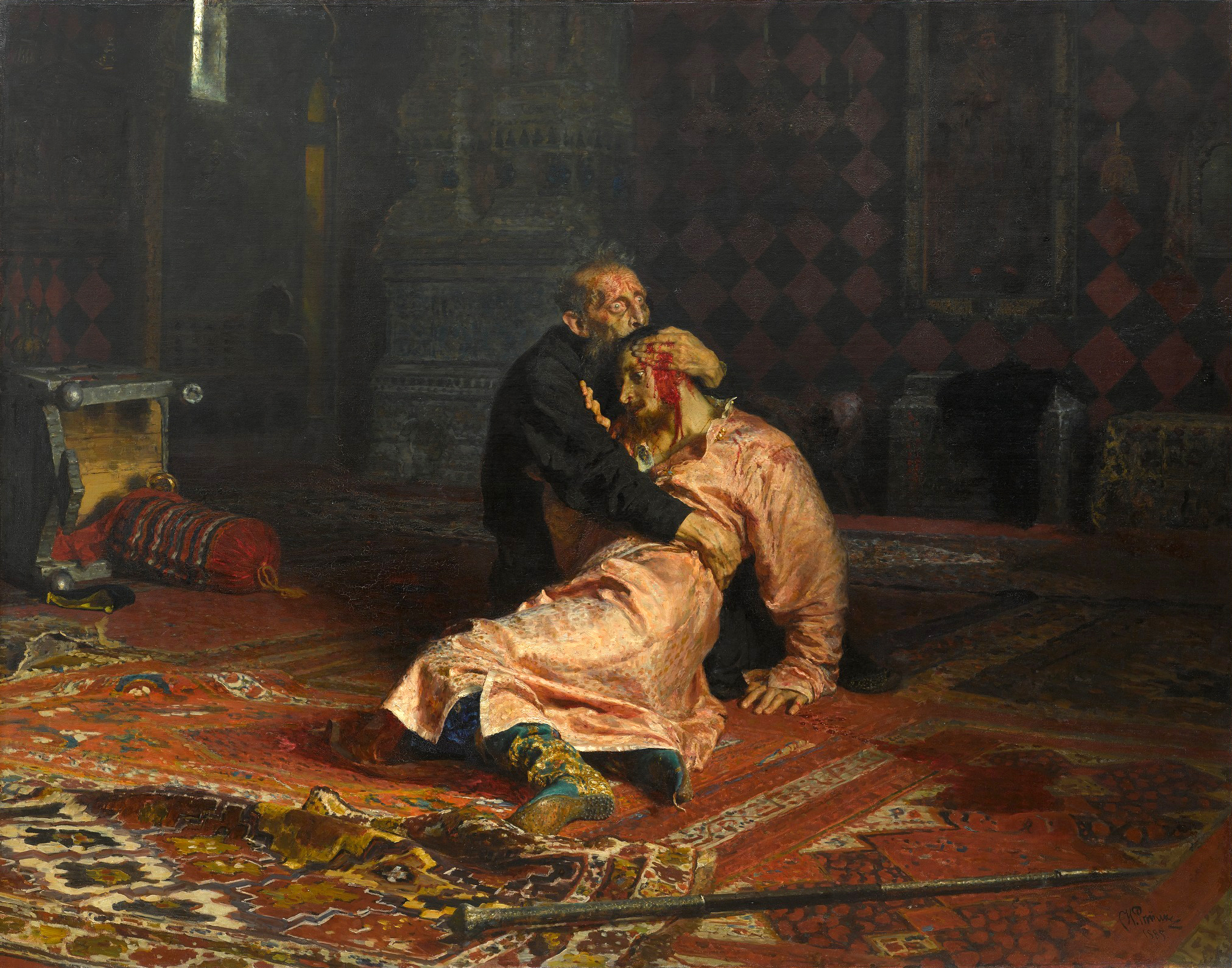
The wounded Ivan being cradled by his father in Ivan the Terrible and His Son Ivan, 1885 painting by Ilya Repin (Tretyakov Gallery, Moscow).

Ivan Ivanovich is generally believed to have been killed by his father, Ivan the Terrible; though there is no direct evidence from primary sources.

Some sources claim Ivan Ivanovich's relationship with his father began to deteriorate during the later stages of the Livonian War. Angry with his father for his military failures, Ivan demanded to be given command of some troops to liberate besieged Pskov.

On 19 November 1581, the elder Ivan chastised the tsarevich's wife Yelena Sheremeteva for being unsuitably dressed, considering her advanced pregnancy, leading to an altercation between the two Ivans. Ivan Ivanovich was killed by his father in a fit of rage, with the argument ending after the elder Ivan fatally struck his son in the head with his pointed staff. Yelena also suffered a miscarriage within hours of the incident. The event is depicted in the famous painting by Ilya Repin, Ivan the Terrible and His Son Ivan.

Ivan's death had grave consequences for Russia, since it left no competent heir to the throne. After the tsar's death in 1584, his unprepared son Feodor I succeeded him as tsar, while Boris Godunov de facto ruled the country. After Feodor's death, Russia entered a period of political uncertainty known as the Time of Troubles.

== Sources ==
- Troyat, Henri Ivan le Terrible. Flammarion, Paris, 1982
- de Madariaga, Isabel Ivan the Terrible. Giulio Einaudi editore, 2005
- Robert Payne and Nikita Romanoff, Ivan The Terrible (New York, 2002)
