= Anna Vasilchikova =

Tsaritsa of Russia 1575–1576/77

Tsaritsa of All Russia
- Tenure: 1575–1576/77
- Died: c. 1576/77
- Spouse: Ivan IV of Russia
- Dynasty: Rurik

Anna Vasilchikova (Анна Васильчикова) was Tsaritsa of the Tsardom of Russia and was the fifth spouse of Ivan the Terrible (Иван Грозный).

== Biography ==
Very little is known of her background. She married Ivan in January 1575 without the blessing of the Ecclesiastical Council of the Russian Orthodox Church. She was repudiated by her husband and made a nun in a monastery. The date of her death is uncertain, having been variously described as occurring in 1576–77.

== Sources ==
- Troyat, Henri Ivan le Terrible. Flammarion, Paris, 1982
- de Madariaga, Isabel Ivan the Terrible. Giulio Einaudi editore, 2005

Russian royalty
Vacant Title last held by Anna Koltovskaya	Tsaritsa of All Russia; 1575–1576/77	Vacant Title next held by Vasilisa Melentyeva
