= Vasilisa Melentyeva =

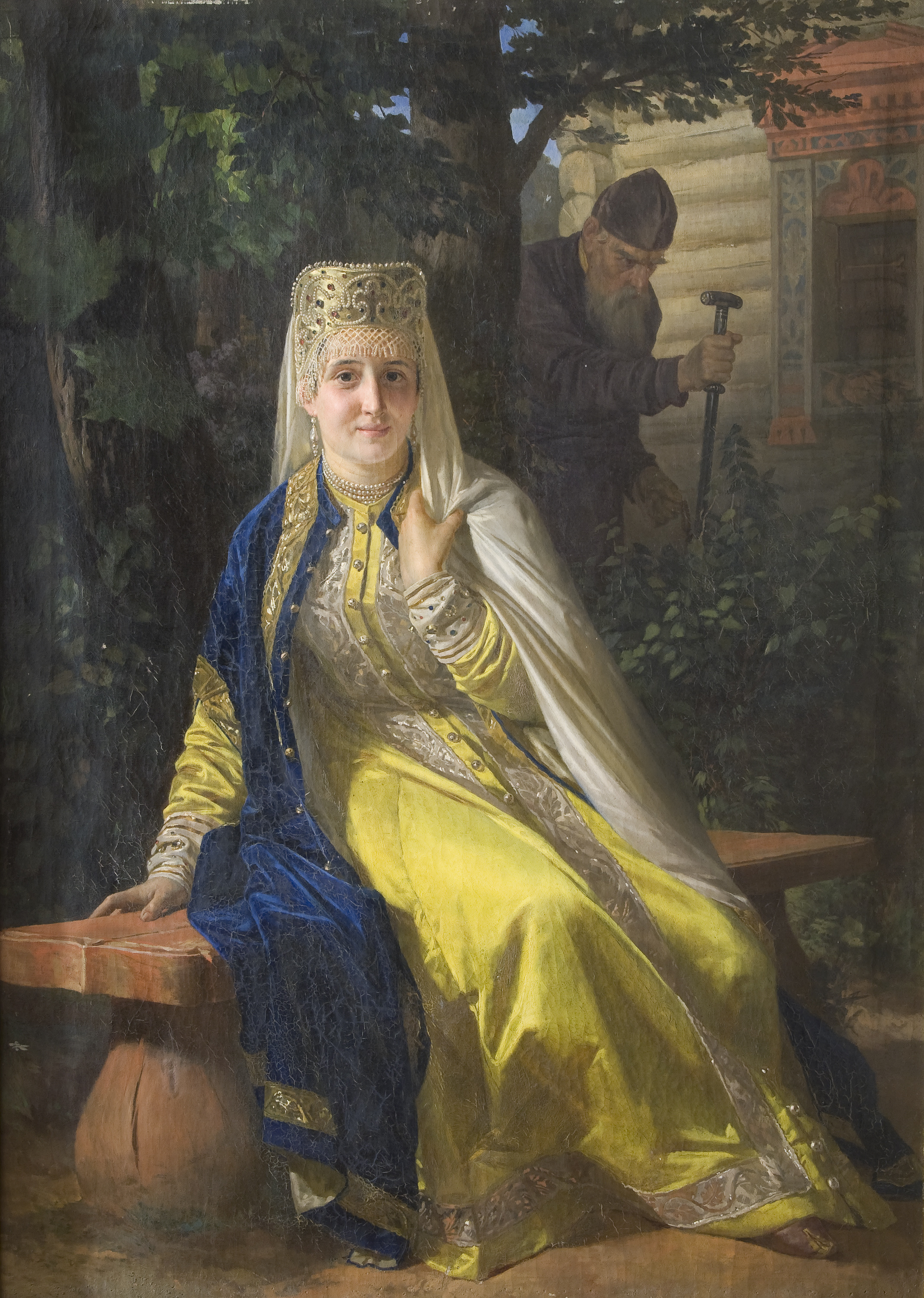
- Portrait by Nikolai Nevrev in 1886

Tsaritsa of All Russia (Disputed existence)
- Tenure: 1579
- Predecessor: Anna Vasilchikova
- Successor: Maria Dolgorukaya (Disputed existence)
- Born: 1560 or 1540; Ukraine or Kingdom of Georgia
- Died: Unknown
- Spouse: Ivan the Terrible
- Dynasty: Rurik (by marriage)
- Religion: Eastern Orthodox

Vasilisa Melentyeva (Russian: Васили́са Меле́нтьева) was the legendary or real sixth wife of Ivan the Terrible. The marriage (not authorized by the Church) may have been celebrated in 1575 or she was simply a concubine. Some modern scholars consider her to be a 19th-century fraud.

== Life ==
Vasilisa was either a Ukrainian or a Georgian slave at the court of Ivan. After the end of his fifth marriage, Ivan wanted to marry again and have more children to secure the future of the dynasty. Ivan saw Vasilisa, freed her from slavery and married her, elevating her from a simple slave to a Russian Tsaritsa.

Ivan admired Vasilisa for her beauty and grace and Vasilisa was the only consort of Ivan that he actually loved since the death of his beloved first wife, Anastasia Romanovna. It is historically unclear whether Vasilisa betrayed Ivan or had a lover or not. However, Ivan divorced Vasilisa and sent her to a monastery, the usual place where unfavored Russian royal consorts were kept in a form of house arrest. Vasilisa did not stay in the monastery for long. She may have died in the monastery, or escaped from Russia.

According to another legend, before her marriage to Ivan, Vasilisa is on record to have been a widow of a dyak, Melentiy Ivanov, serving in the Livonian War. Though the Tsar considered her beautiful and sweet natured, a few months after their marriage, he discovered her having an affair with a prince named Devletev. Ivan forced Vasilisa to watch her lover be impaled, and as further punishment, confined her to life in a cloister.

Of all the eight wives of Ivan the Terrible, only Maria Dolgorukaya (who is also considered a 19th-century fraud) and Vasilisa Melentyeva do not have graves or any mentions in official court documents.

There is apparently no evidence of her existence in the early modern sources except two minor mentions: the first, cited by Nikolay Karamzin, simply listed her name "as concubine" with Ivan's other spouses. The more extensive second mention, is believed to be the work of Alexander Sulakadzev, a notorious forger of the early 19th century.

However it is claimed that researchers have more recently found documents confirming her special relationship with the tsar.

Alexander Ostrovsky wrote a play about her in 1867: "Василиса Мелентьева".

== Sources ==
- Troyat, Henri Ivan le Terrible. Flammarion, Paris, 1982
- de Madariaga, Isabel Ivan the Terrible. Giulio Einaudi editore, 2005

Russian royalty
Vacant Title last held by Anna Vasilchikova	Tsaritsa of All Russia; 1579	Vacant Title next held by Maria Dolgorukaya
