= Anna Koltovskaya =

Tsaritsa of Russia in 1572

Tsaritsa consort of all Russia
- Tenure: 29 April 1572 – 1574
- Born: c. 1552
- Died: 5 April 1626 (aged 73-74); Tikhvin
- Burial: Tikhvin Vvedensky Monastery
- Spouse: Ivan IV of Russia
- Anna Alexeievna Koltovskaya
- Dynasty: Rurik (by marriage)
- Father: Alexei Koltovski

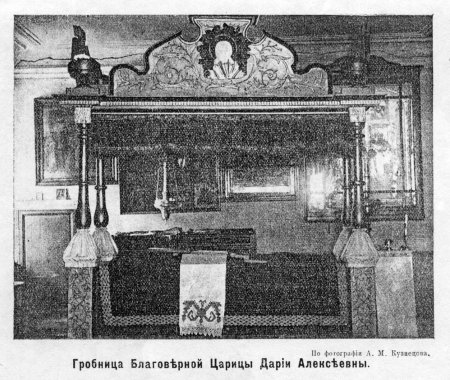
photograph of Anna Koltovskaya's grave

Anna Alexeievna Koltovskaya (Russian: Анна Алексеевна Колтовская; c. 1552 – 5 April 1626), also known by her monastic name Daria (Дария), was tsaritsa of all Russia as the fourth wife of Ivan the Terrible, the tsar of all Russia.

== Life ==
After the sudden death of his third wife Marfa Sobakina on 13 November 1571, Ivan had difficulty in securing another marriage, due to the laws of the Russian Orthodox Church prohibiting fourth marriages; "The first marriage is law; the second an extraordinary concession; the third is a violation of the law; the fourth is an impiety, a state similar to that of animals." Ivan countered this by claiming he did not consummate his third marriage.

He married Koltovskaya, the daughter of Alexei Koltovski, a courtier, on 29 April 1572 without asking the Church's blessing. Ivan organised a meeting in the church of the Assumption, and gave a heartfelt speech which moved the prelates to tears. They agreed to Ivan's marriage, although on the condition that he not attend church until Easter, and that for a year, he spend time with penitents, and a year later, with common Christians. Their honeymoon took place in Novgorod, which only two years earlier had been decimated by Ivan in the Massacre of Novgorod.

After two years of marriage, Ivan began to tire of his wife due to her sterility. He repudiated her, and sent her to the convent of Vedenski-Tikhvinski, where she assumed the monastic name of Daria. Only she and Maria Nagaya, the last (sixth, possibly seventh or eighth) wife of Ivan the terrible, outlived the tsar.

Russian royalty
Vacant Title last held by Marfa Sobakina	Tsaritsa of all Russia; 1572–1574	Vacant Title next held by Anna Vasilchikova
