= Ivan the Terrible =

Tsar of Russia from 1547 to 1584

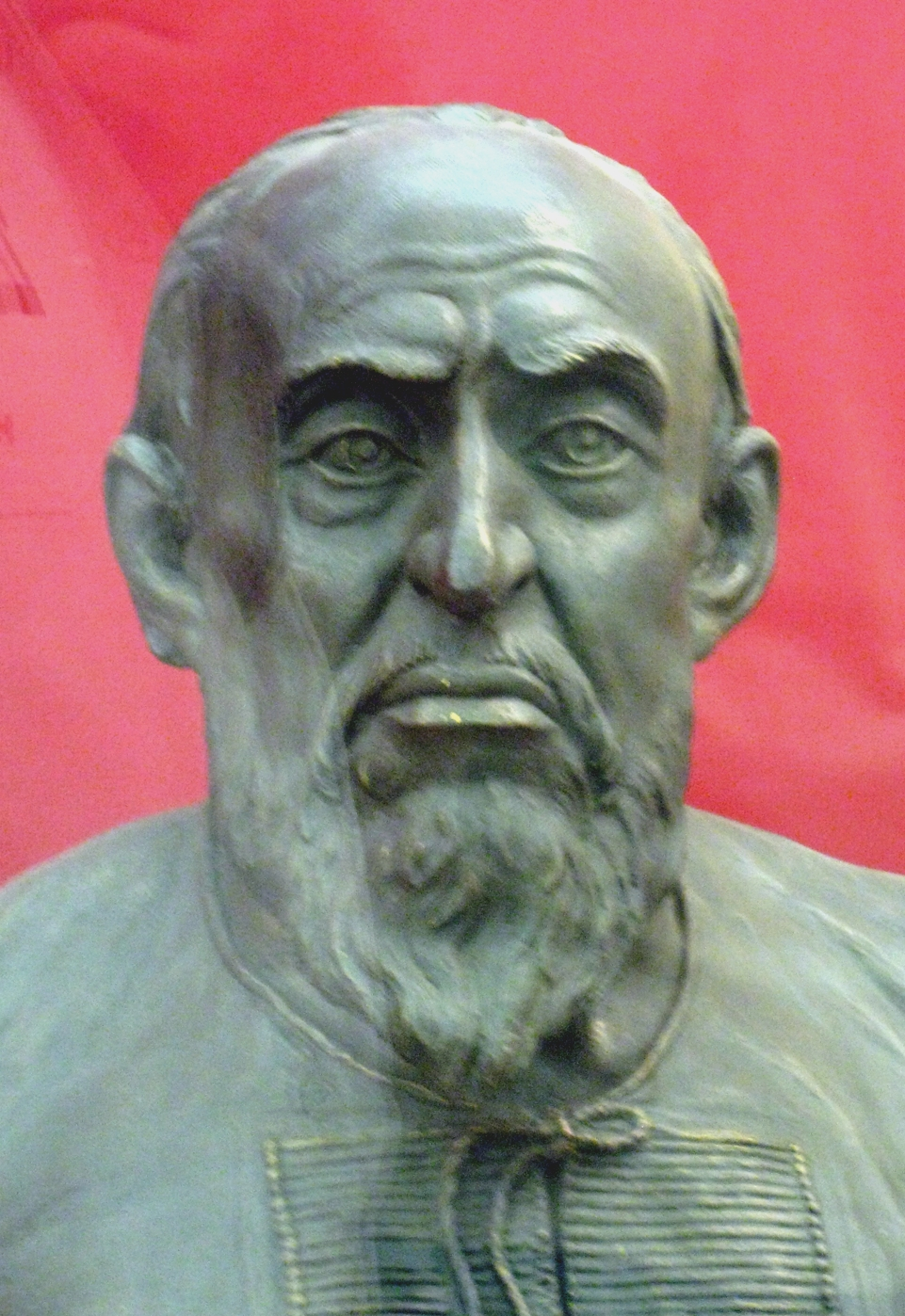
- Forensic facial reconstruction of Ivan IV by Mikhail Gerasimov, 1963

Tsar of all Russia
- Reign: 16 January 1547 – 28 March 1584
- Coronation: 16 January 1547
- Predecessor: Himself as Grand Prince of Moscow
- Successor: Feodor I

Grand Prince of Moscow and all Russia
- Reign: 13 December 1533 – 16 January 1547
- Predecessor: Vasili III
- Successor: Himself as Tsar of all Russia
- Regent: Elena Glinskaya (1533–1538)
- Born: 25 August 1530; Kolomenskoye, Russia
- Died: 28 March 1584 (aged 53); Moscow, Russia
- Burial: Cathedral of the Archangel
- Spouses: Anastasia Romanovna (m. 1547; died 1560) Maria Temryukovna (m. 1561; died 1569) Marfa Sobakina (m. 1571; died 1571) Anna Koltovskaya (m. 1572; div. 1574) Anna Vasilchikova (m. 1575; div. 1576) Maria Nagaya (m. 1580)
- Issue Detail: Dmitry Ivanovich; Ivan Ivanovich; Feodor I of Russia; Dmitry Ivanovich
Names
- Ivan Vasilyevich
- Dynasty: Rurik
- Father: Vasili III of Russia
- Mother: Elena Glinskaya
- Religion: Russian Orthodox

Ivan IV Vasilyevich (Russian: Иван IV Васильевич; (Note: Church Slavonic: Іѡа́ннъ Васи́лїевичъ.) 25 August 1530 – 28 March [O.S. 18 March] 1584), commonly known as Ivan the Terrible, (Note: Russian: Иван Грозный, romanized: Ivan Grozny, IPA: [ɪˈvan ˈɡroznɨj], lit. 'Ivan the Formidable' or 'Ivan the Fearsome' or 'Ivan the Awe-Inspiring'; Latin: Ioannes Severus; monastic name: Jonah.) was Grand Prince of Moscow and all Russia from 1533 to 1547 and the first Tsar and Grand Prince of all Russia from 1547 until his death in 1584. Ivan's reign was characterised by Russia's transformation from a medieval state to a fledgling empire, but at an immense cost to its people and long-term economy.

Ivan IV was the eldest son of Vasili III by his second wife Elena Glinskaya, and a grandson of Ivan III. He succeeded his father after his death, when he was three years old. A group of reformers united around the young Ivan, crowning him as tsar in 1547 at the age of 16. In the early years of his reign, Ivan ruled with the group of reformers known as the Chosen Council and established the Zemsky Sobor, a new assembly convened by the tsar. He also revised the legal code and introduced reforms, including elements of local self-government, as well as establishing the first Russian standing army, the streltsy. Ivan conquered the khanates of Kazan and Astrakhan, bringing the entire length of the Volga River under Russian control.

After he had consolidated his power, Ivan rid himself of the advisers from the Chosen Council. In an effort to establish a stronghold in the Baltic Sea, he triggered the Livonian War of 1558 to 1583. The war ravaged Russia and resulted in failure to take control over Livonia and the loss of Ingria, but allowed Ivan to establish greater autocratic control over the Russian nobility. He conducted a violent purge using Russia's first political police, the oprichniki. The later years of Ivan's reign were marked by the massacre of Novgorod by the oprichniki and the burning of Moscow by the Crimean Tatars. Ivan also pursued cultural improvements, such as importing the first printing press to Russia, and began several processes that would continue for centuries, including deepening connections with other European states, particularly England, fighting wars against the Ottoman Empire, and the conquest of Siberia.

Contemporary sources present disparate accounts of Ivan's complex personality. He was described as intelligent and devout, but also prone to paranoia, rage, and episodic outbreaks of mental instability that worsened with age. Historians generally believe that in a fit of anger, he murdered his eldest son and heir, Ivan Ivanovich; he might also have caused the miscarriage of the latter's unborn child. This left his younger son, the politically ineffectual Feodor Ivanovich, to inherit the throne, a man whose rule and subsequent childless death led to the end of the Rurik dynasty and the beginning of the Time of Troubles.

== Epithet ==
The English word terrible is usually used to translate the Russian word grozny (грозный) in Ivan's epithet, but this is a somewhat archaic translation. The Russian word grozny reflects the older English usage of terrible as in "inspiring fear or terror; dangerous; powerful" (i.e., similar to modern English terrifying or formidable). It does not convey the more modern connotations of English terrible such as "defective" or "evil". According to Edward L. Keenan, Ivan the Terrible's image in popular culture as a tyrant came from politicised Western travel literature of the Renaissance era. Anti-Russian propaganda during the Livonian War portrayed Ivan as a sadistic and oriental despot. Vladimir Dal defines grozny specifically in archaic usage and as an epithet for tsars: "courageous, magnificent, magisterial and keeping enemies in fear, but people in obedience". Other translations have also been suggested by modern scholars, including formidable, as well as awe-inspiring.

There is no evidence of grozny being used as an epithet for Ivan during his own lifetime. According to Keenan, it only began to be used in reference to him in the 18th century. One of the first historians to use this epithet for him was Vasily Tatishchev, however, the epithet gained popularity with the writings of the historian Nikolay Karamzin.

== Early life ==
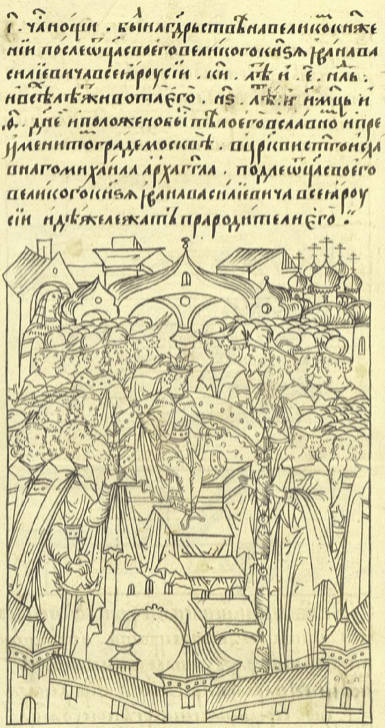
Ivan sits on the throne, miniature from the Illustrated Chronicle of Ivan the Terrible

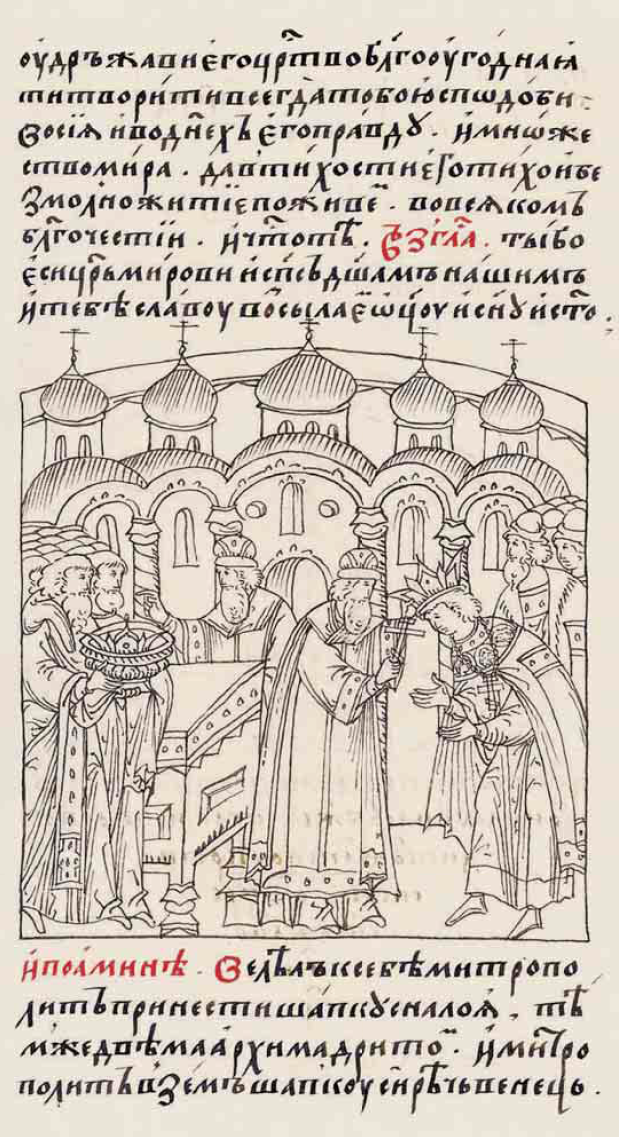
Ivan crowned tsar

Ivan Vasilyevich was the first son of Vasili III by his second wife, Elena Glinskaya. Vasili's mother, Sophia Palaiologina, was a Byzantine princess of the Palaiologos family. She was a daughter of Thomas Palaiologos, the younger brother of the last Byzantine emperor, Constantine XI Palaiologos (r. 1449–1453). Elena's mother was a Serbian princess and her father's family, the Tatar Glinski clan (nobles based in the Grand Duchy of Lithuania), claimed descent both from Orthodox Hungarian nobles and the Mongol ruler Mamai (1335–1380). Born on 25 August 1530, he received the name Ivan in honor of St. John the Baptist, the day of whose beheading falls on 29 August. In some texts of that era, it is also occasionally mentioned with the names Titus and Smaragd, in accordance with the tradition of polyonymy among the Rurikids. He was baptized in the Trinity Lavra of St. Sergius by Abbot Joasaph (Skripitsyn) and two elders of the Joseph-Volokolamsk Monastery were elected as recipients—the monk Cassian Bossoy and the hegumen Daniel. Tradition says that in honor of the birth of Ivan, the Church of the Ascension was built in Kolomenskoye.

When Ivan was three years old, his father died from an abscess and inflammation on his leg that developed into blood poisoning. The closest contenders to the throne, except for the young Ivan, were the younger brothers of Vasily. Of the six sons of Ivan III, only two remained: Andrey and Yuri. Ivan was proclaimed the grand prince at the request of his father. His mother Elena Glinskaya initially acted as regent, but died in 1538, when Ivan was eight years old; many believe that she was poisoned. The regency then alternated between several feuding boyar families that fought for control. According to his own letters, Ivan, along with his younger brother Yuri, often felt neglected and offended by the mighty boyars from the Shuisky and Belsky families. In a letter to Andrey Kurbsky, Ivan remembered, "My brother Iurii, of blessed memory, and me they brought up like vagrants and children of the poorest. What have I suffered for want of garments and food!" That account has been challenged by the historian Edward Keenan, who doubts the authenticity of the source in which the quotations are found.

On 16 January 1547, at the age of 16, Ivan was crowned at the Cathedral of the Dormition in the Moscow Kremlin. The metropolitan placed the signs of royal dignity on Ivan: the Cross of the Life-Giving Tree, barmas, and the cap of Monomakh; Ivan Vasilyevich was anointed with myrrh, after which the metropolitan blessed the tsar. He was the first Russian monarch to be crowned the tsar of all Russia, partly imitating his grandfather, Ivan III. Until then, the rulers of Moscow were crowned as grand princes, but Ivan III assumed the title of sovereign of all Russia and used the title of tsar in his correspondence with other monarchs.

Two weeks after his coronation in 1547, Ivan IV married Anastasia Romanovna, a member of the Romanov family, who became the first Russian tsaritsa.

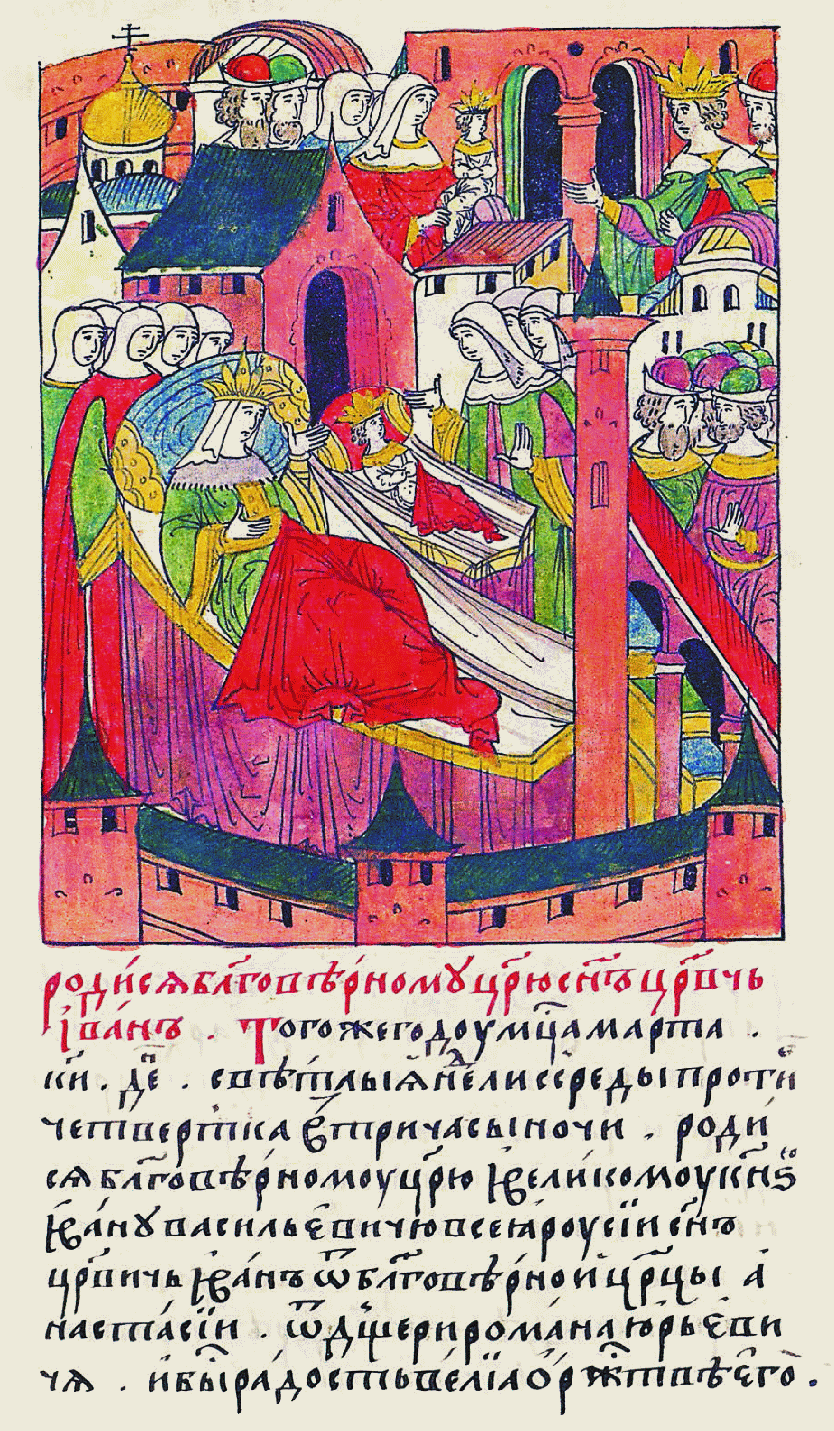
Birth of Ivan Ivanovich, the son of Ivan IV and Anastasia Romanovna, miniature from the Illustrated Chronicle of Ivan the Terrible

By being crowned tsar, Ivan was sending a message to the world and to Russia that he was now the only supreme ruler of the country, and his will was not to be questioned. According to historian Janet Martin, the new title "symbolized an assumption of powers equivalent and parallel to those held by the former Byzantine caesar and the Tatar khan, both known in Russian sources as tsar. The political effect was to elevate Ivan's position". The new title not only secured the throne but also granted Ivan a new dimension of power that was intimately tied to religion. He was now a "divine" leader appointed to enact God's will, as "church texts described Old Testament kings as 'Tsars' and Christ as the Heavenly Tsar". The newly appointed title was then passed on from generation to generation, and "succeeding Muscovite rulers... benefited from the divine nature of the power of the Russian monarch... crystallized during Ivan's reign".

Like the Habsburgs and other monarchs in Europe, the first Russian tsars adopted mythological genealogies that connected them to Ancient Rome. In The Tale of the Princes of Vladimir, their lineage is traced to Rurik, the first prince of Novgorod in northern Russia, while a certain Prus, an alleged brother of Augustus who ruled what would become Prussia, is mentioned as a direct ancestor of Rurik. Ivan IV often mentioned his apparent kinship with Augustus, claiming not to be a "Russe" and highlighting his "German" descent from Rurik. Such genealogies served to elevate the position of the Russian monarch in the eyes of his subjects and other European powers, who were also creating mythological ancestors for themselves.

== Domestic policy ==
Despite the devastation caused by the Great Fire of 1547, the early years of Ivan IV's reign were characterized by a period of reform and modernization. Ivan revised the legal code, issuing the Sudebnik of 1550, and established a standing army, the streltsy. He also convened the Zemsky Sobor, regarded as the first Russian parliament of feudal estates. He also established the Chosen Council, a body of advisers drawn from the nobility and clergy.

In ecclesiastical matters, Ivan strengthened the authority of the Russian Orthodox Church through the Council of the Hundred Chapters (Stoglavy Sobor, 1551), which standardized rituals and ecclesiastical law across the realm. He further introduced forms of local self-government in rural areas—particularly in northeastern Russia, populated by state peasants—to improve local administration and tax collection.

In 1553, Ivan suffered a near-fatal illness and was thought not able to recover. While on his presumed deathbed Ivan had asked the boyars to swear an oath of allegiance to his eldest son, an infant at the time. Many boyars refused since they deemed the tsar's health too hopeless for him to survive. This angered Ivan and added to his distrust of the boyars. There followed brutal reprisals and assassinations, including those of Metropolitan Philip and Prince Alexander Gorbatyi-Shuisky.

In 1553, Ivan IV ordered the establishment of the Moscow Print Yard, introducing the first printing press to Russia. During the 1550s and 1560s, several religious books in Church Slavonic were printed, marking the beginning of Russian movable-type printing. However, the new technology provoked strong opposition from traditional scribes, culminating in an arson attack that destroyed the Print Yard. The printers Ivan Fyodorov and Pyotr Mstislavets subsequently fled to the Grand Duchy of Lithuania, where they continued their work. Printing in Moscow resumed in 1568, under Andronik Timofeevich Nevezha and his son Ivan, who reestablished production at the rebuilt Print Yard.

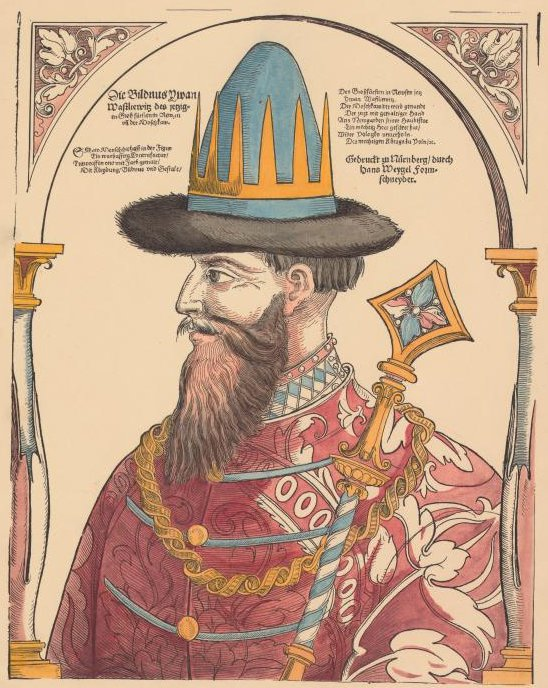
16th-century portrait of Ivan by Hans Weigel

Ivan had Saint Basil's Cathedral constructed in Moscow to commemorate the seizure of Kazan. There is a legend that he was so impressed with the structure that he had the architect, Postnik Yakovlev, blinded so that he could never design anything as beautiful again. However, in reality Postnik Yakovlev went on to design more churches for Ivan and the walls of the Kazan Kremlin in the early 1560s as well as the chapel over Saint Basil's grave, which was added to Saint Basil's Cathedral in 1588, several years after Ivan's death. Although more than one architect was associated with that name, it is believed that the principal architect is the same person.

Other events of the period include the introduction of the first laws restricting peasants' mobility, which eventually led to serfdom and were instituted during the rule of the future Tsar Boris Godunov in 1597. (See also Serfdom in Russia.)

The combination of poor harvests, the devastation caused by the oprichnina and Tatar raids, the strain of a prolonged war, and overpopulation led to a severe social and economic crisis during the latter part of Ivan IV's reign.

=== Oprichnina ===
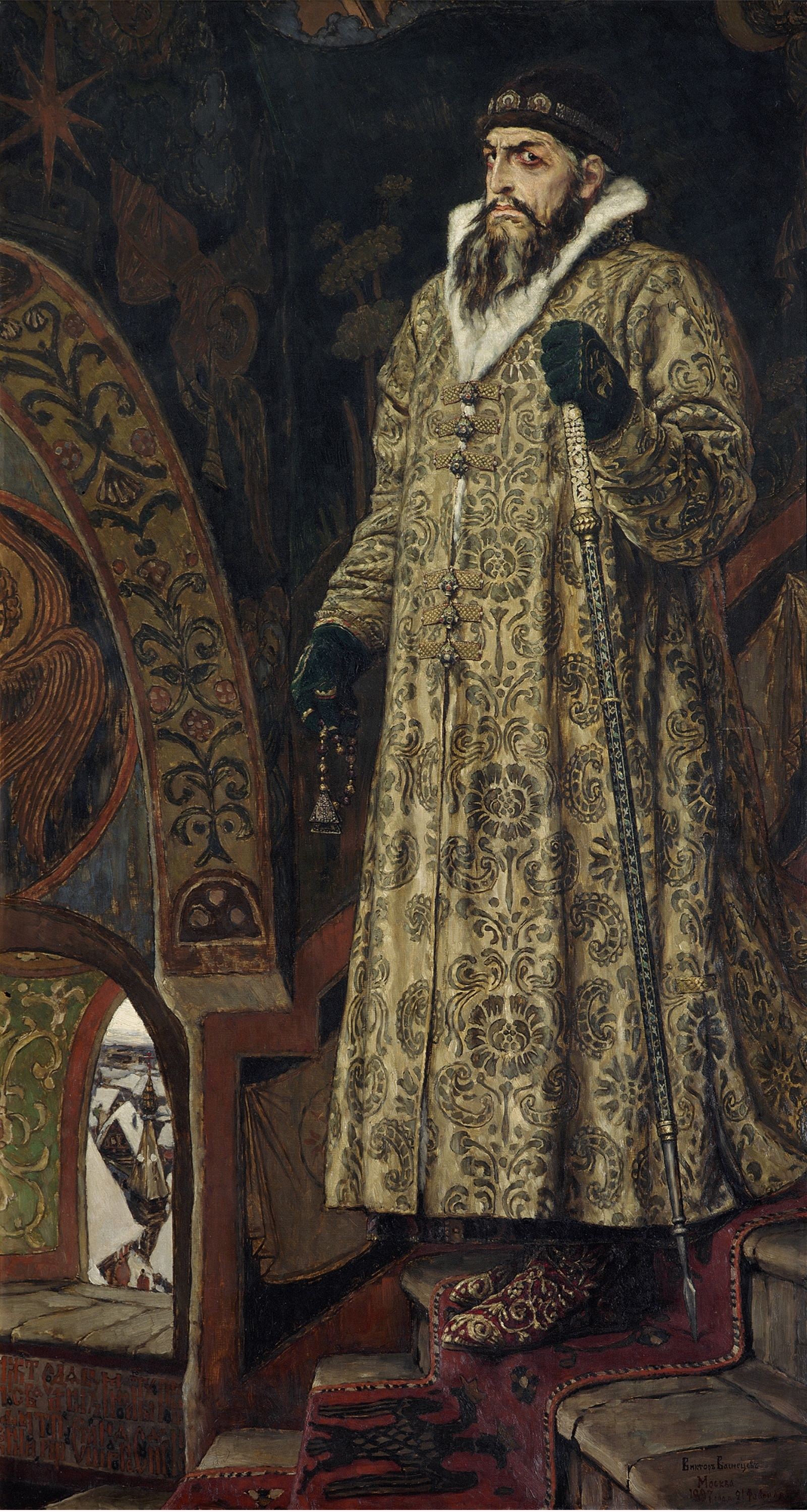
Portrait of Ivan IV by Viktor Vasnetsov, 1897 (Tretyakov Gallery, Moscow)

The 1560s brought a series of hardships that marked a turning point in Ivan IV's reign and led to a sharp change in his domestic and foreign policies. Russia suffered from a combination of drought, famine, military defeats in the wars against the Polish–Lithuanian Commonwealth, recurring Tatar invasions, and a naval blockade of Baltic trade imposed by the Swedes, Poles, and the Hanseatic League.

In 1560, the death of Ivan's first wife, Anastasia Romanovna,—believed by some contemporaries to have been caused by poisoning—was a profound personal blow that reportedly worsened his already volatile temperament and mental state. Around the same time, one of his closest advisers, Andrey Kurbsky, defected to Lithuania, where he took command of Lithuanian forces and led raids into Russian territory, including the Velikiye Luki region. This perceived betrayal, combined with mounting internal instability, deepened Ivan’s distrust of the nobility, leading to increasingly repressive measures against the boyar class.

On 3 December 1564, Ivan left Moscow for Aleksandrova Sloboda, where he sent two letters in which he announced his abdication because of the alleged embezzlement and treason of the aristocracy and the clergy. The boyar court was unable to rule in Ivan's absence and feared the wrath of the Muscovite citizens. A boyar envoy departed for Aleksandrova Sloboda to beg Ivan to return to the throne. Ivan agreed to return on condition of being granted absolute power. He demanded the right to condemn and execute traitors and confiscate their estates without interference from the boyar council or church. Ivan decreed the creation of the oprichnina.

The oprichnina was a separate territory within Russia, mostly in the former Novgorod Republic in the north. Ivan held exclusive power over the territory. The Boyar Council ruled the zemshchina ('land'), the second division of the state. Ivan also recruited a personal guard known as the oprichniki, originally numbered 1,000. The oprichniki were headed by Malyuta Skuratov. One known oprichnik was the German adventurer Heinrich von Staden. The oprichniki enjoyed social and economic privileges under the oprichnina. They owed their allegiance and status to Ivan, not heredity or local bonds.

The first wave of persecutions targeted primarily the princely clans of Russia, notably the influential families of Suzdal. Ivan executed, exiled or forcibly tonsured prominent members of the boyar clans on questionable accusations of conspiracy. Among those who were executed were the Metropolitan Philip and the prominent warlord Alexander Gorbaty-Shuisky. In 1566, Ivan extended the oprichnina to eight central districts. Of the 12,000 nobles, 570 became oprichniki and the rest were expelled. (Note: As the tonsure was the distinctive hairstyle of monastic orders, a forcibly tonsured boyar was effectively exiled from power by being made to enter a monastic life.)

Under the new political and administrative system of the oprichnina, members of the oprichniki were granted large estates, but—unlike earlier landholders—they were not held accountable for their actions. According to contemporary accounts, they seized nearly all that peasants possessed, forcing them to pay "in one year as much as they used to pay in ten." The resulting oppression and instability prompted a growing number of peasants to flee their lands, leading to a decline in agricultural production. As a consequence, the price of grain increased roughly tenfold, exacerbating the wider economic crisis of Ivan's later reign.

Following the death of his son and the excesses committed under the oprichnina, Ivan IV reportedly expressed remorse for his actions. He is said to have compiled lists of the Christian victims executed or persecuted during the period and sent them to monasteries, requesting that prayers be offered for each by name.

=== Sack of Novgorod ===
Conditions under the oprichnina were worsened by the 1570 epidemic, a plague that killed 10,000 people in Novgorod and 600 to 1,000 daily in Moscow. During the grim conditions of the epidemic, a famine and the ongoing Livonian War, Ivan grew suspicious that noblemen in the wealthy city of Novgorod were planning to defect and place the city under the control of the Grand Duchy of Lithuania. A Novgorod citizen, Petr Volynets, warned the tsar about an alleged conspiracy, that modern historians believe never happened. In 1570, Ivan ordered the oprichniki to raid the city. The oprichniki burned and pillaged Novgorod and the surrounding villages; the city has never regained its former prominence.

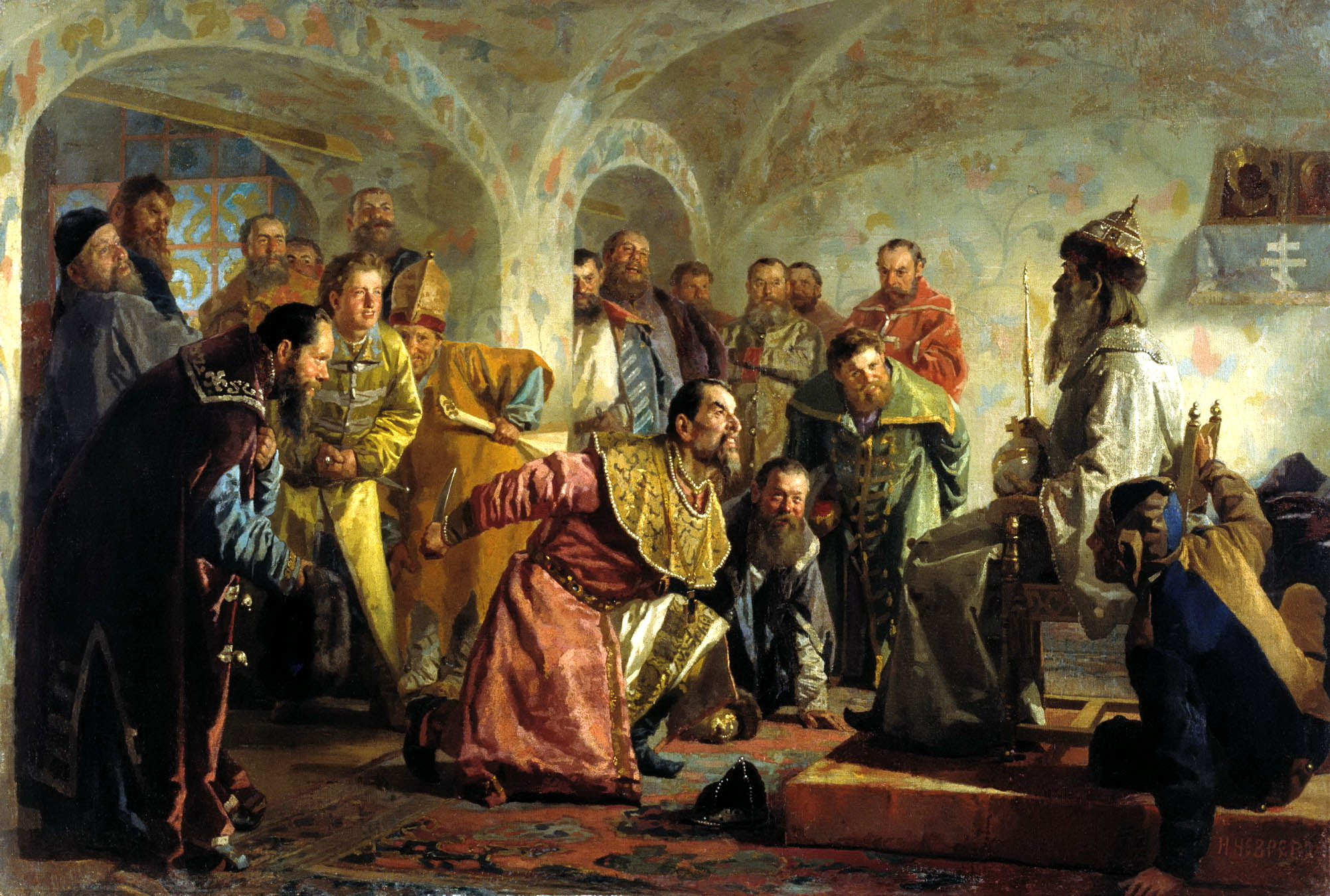
The Oprichniki by Nikolai Nevrev (1888). The painting shows the last minutes of boyarin Feodorov, who was arrested for treason. To mock his alleged ambitions on the tsar's title, the nobleman was given the tsar's regalia before his execution.

Casualty figures vary between different sources. The First Pskov Chronicle estimates the number of victims at 60,000. (Note: According to the Third Novgorod Chronicle, the massacre lasted for five weeks. Almost every day, 500 or 600 people were killed or drowned.) According to the Third Novgorod Chronicle, the massacre lasted for five weeks. The massacre of Novgorod consisted of men, women and children who were tied to sleighs and run into the freezing waters of the Volkhov, which Ivan ordered on the basis of unproven accusations of treason. He then tortured its inhabitants and killed thousands in a pogrom. The archbishop was also hunted to death. Almost every day, 500 or 600 people were killed, some by drowning, but the official death toll named 1,500 of Novgorod's "big people" (nobility) and mentioned only about the same number of "smaller people". Many modern researchers estimate the number of victims to range from 2,000 to 3,000 since after the famine and epidemics of the 1560s the population of Novgorod most likely did not exceed 10,000–20,000. (Note: Having investigated the report of Maljuta Skuratov and commemoration lists (sinodiki), R. Skrynnikov considers that the number of victims was 2,000–3,000. (Skrynnikov R. G., "Ivan Grosny", M., AST, 2001)) Many survivors were deported from the city.

The Oprichnina did not survive long after the Massacre of Novgorod. During the Russo-Crimean campaigns of 1571–1572, the Oprichniki failed to demonstrate effectiveness against regular Tatar and Ottoman forces. Their poor performance during the Crimean raid of 1571 and subsequent defeats highlighted the system’s military and administrative weaknesses. In 1572, Ivan formally abolished the Oprichnina and disbanded the Oprichniki, reintegrating the territories and administration into the regular state structure.

=== Appointment of Simeon Bekbulatovich ===
In September or October 1575, Ivan IV unexpectedly proclaimed Simeon Bekbulatovich, a statesman of Tatar origin, as Grand Prince of All Russia. Simeon served as a nominal ruler for about a year, while Ivan retained de facto control of the government. According to the English envoy Giles Fletcher the Elder, Simeon—acting on Ivan’s instructions—confiscated lands belonging to monasteries, while Ivan publicly feigned opposition to the measure. When the throne was formally restored to Ivan in September 1576, he returned some of the confiscated estates but retained a substantial portion for the crown.

== Foreign policy ==
=== Diplomacy and trade ===
Ivan the Terrible Showing His Treasures to Jerome Horsey by Alexander Litovchenko (1875)

In 1547, Ivan IV sent his agent Hans Schlitte to Germany to recruit skilled craftsmen and specialists for service in Russia. However, the recruits were arrested in Lübeck at the request of Poland and Livonia, preventing their arrival. Despite Ivan's efforts to open direct access to Western trade, his newly established Ivangorod port on the Narva River in 1550 was largely ignored by German merchant companies, which continued to route commerce through Livonian-controlled Baltic ports. As a result, Russia remained effectively isolated from maritime trade with Western Europe.

Ivan established close ties with the Kingdom of England. Russian–English relations can be traced to 1551, when the Muscovy Company was formed by Richard Chancellor, Sebastian Cabot, Sir Hugh Willoughby, and several London merchants. In 1553, Chancellor sailed to the White Sea and continued overland to Moscow, where he visited Ivan's court. Ivan opened up the White Sea and the port of Arkhangelsk to the company and granted it the privilege of trading throughout his reign without paying the standard customs fees.

Through English merchants, Ivan engaged in a long correspondence with Elizabeth I of England. While the queen focused on commerce, Ivan was more interested in a military alliance. Ivan even proposed to her once, and during his troubled relations with the boyars, he even asked her for a guarantee to be granted asylum in England if his rule was jeopardised. Elizabeth agreed on the condition that he provide for himself during his potential stay.

Ivan corresponded with overseas Orthodox leaders. In response to a letter of Patriarch Joachim of Alexandria asking him for financial assistance for the Saint Catherine's Monastery, in the Sinai Peninsula, which had suffered by the Turks, Ivan sent in 1558 a delegation to Egypt Eyalet by Archdeacon Gennady, who, however, died in Constantinople before he could reach Egypt. From then on, the embassy was headed by Smolensk merchant Vasily Poznyakov, whose delegation visited Alexandria, Cairo, and the Sinai; brought the patriarch a fur coat and an icon sent by Ivan and left an interesting account of his two-and-a-half years of travels.

Ivan was the first ruler to begin cooperating with the free Cossacks on a large scale. Relations were handled through the Posolsky Prikaz diplomatic department; Moscow sent them money and weapons, while tolerating their freedoms, to draw them into an alliance against the Tatars. The first evidence of cooperation surfaces in 1549 when Ivan ordered the Don Cossacks to attack Crimea.

=== Conquest of Kazan and Astrakhan ===
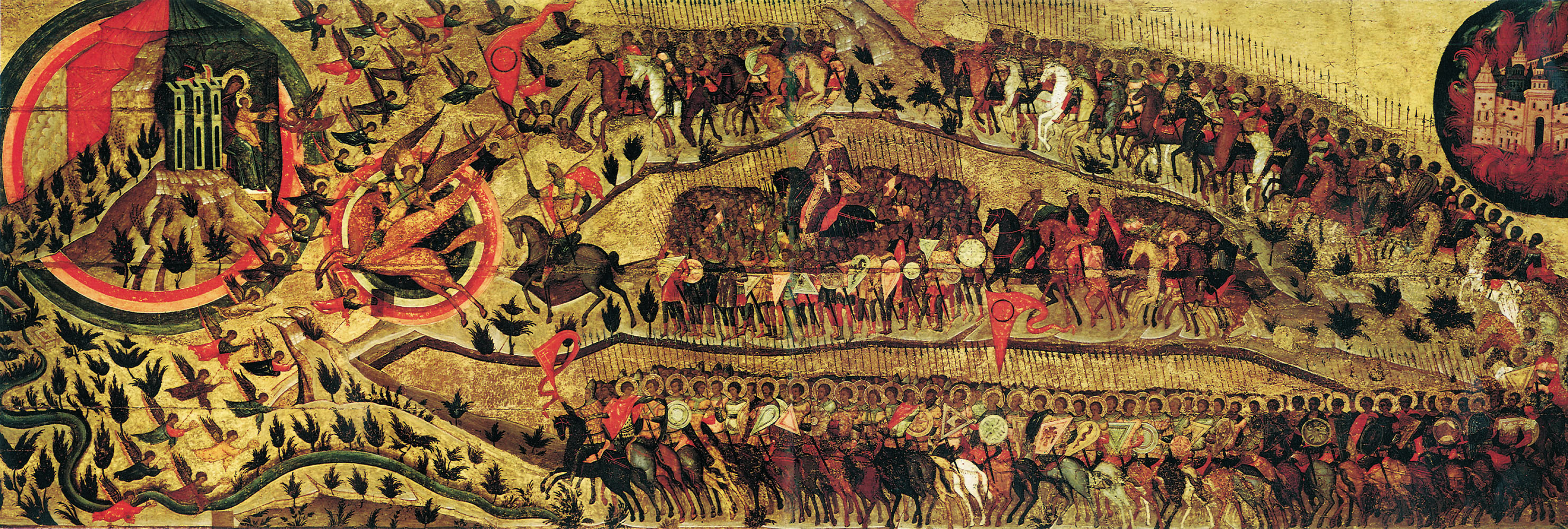
Blessed Be the Host of the King of Heaven, a Russian icon from c. 1550–1560, an allegory of the conquest of Kazan

While Ivan was a child, armies of the Kazan Khanate repeatedly raided northeastern Russia. (Note: Russian chronicles record about 40 attacks of Kazan Khans on Russian territories (the regions of Nizhniy Novgorod, Murom, Vyatka, Vladimir, Kostroma, and Galich) in the first half of the 16th century. In 1521, the combined forces of Khan Mehmed Giray and his Crimean allies attacked Russia, captured more than 150,000 slaves. The Full Collection of the Russian Annals, vol. 13, SPb, 1904)

In the 1530s, the Crimean Khan formed an offensive alliance with his relative Safa Giray, the Khan of Kazan, in an effort to counter the growing power of Muscovy. Both khanates, successor states of the Golden Horde, sought to reassert influence over the Volga and Oka river regions, where Moscow had steadily expanded its control. In December 1540, Safa Giray launched an invasion of Muscovite territory, advancing toward Murom. His campaign was checked by forces that included Qasim Tatars, Muslim allies of the Grand Duchy of Moscow. After his advance was halted near Murom, Safa Giray was forced to withdraw to Kazan.

The failure of the 1540 campaign marked a turning point in relations between Kazan and Moscow. Continued raids and internal instability within the Kazan Khanate prompted renewed Muscovite military expeditions in the 1540s and early 1550s. These culminated in Ivan IV's successful conquest of Kazan in 1552, which brought the khanate under Russian control and extended Muscovy’s dominion deep into the Volga basin.

The military setbacks suffered by Safa Giray weakened his authority within the Kazan Khanate. In the aftermath, a pro-Russian faction led by Shahghali (also known as Shah Ali), the khan of the Qasim Khanate, gained influence and made several attempts to seize the Kazan throne with Muscovite backing. In 1545, Ivan IV personally led an expedition down the Volga River to demonstrate support for Shahghali and the pro-Moscow party within Kazan.

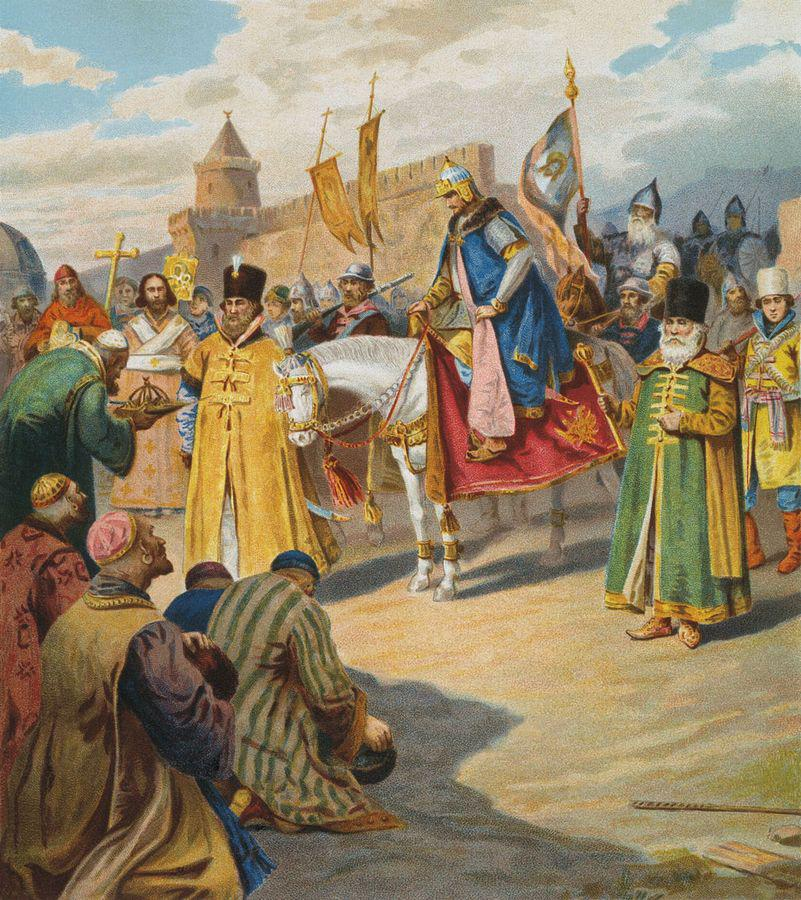
Ivan IV under the walls of Kazan by Pyotr Korovin (1890)

In 1551, Tsar Ivan IV dispatched envoys to the Nogai Horde, who agreed to maintain neutrality during the impending campaign against the Kazan Khanate. During the same period, several local groups, including the Ar begs and Udmurts, acknowledged Muscovite authority, strengthening Russia's strategic position along the Volga River frontier in preparation for the final assault on Kazan.

That same year, the Russians constructed the wooden fortress of Sviyazhsk, which was assembled in Uglich and transported in sections down the Volga River to a site near Kazan. The fortress served as the main place of arms—a fortified base of operations—for the decisive campaign of 1552, from which Ivan IV’s army launched its successful assault on the Tatar capital.

On 16 June 1552, Ivan IV led a large Russian army toward Kazan, beginning the final campaign against the Kazan Khanate. The siege of Kazan began on 30 August 1552. Under the command of Prince Alexander Gorbaty-Shuysky, the Russians employed battering rams, a siege tower, undermining tactics, and a formidable artillery train of around 150 cannons. The army also benefited from the expertise of foreign military engineers, who played a crucial role in breaching the city’s defences.

The Russian forces cut off Kazan's water supply, bombarded its fortifications, and eventually breached the walls. On 2 October 1552, the city fell after intense fighting; its fortifications were destroyed, and a large portion of the population was killed, though thousands of Russian prisoners and slaves held within the city were freed. Ivan IV marked his victory with the construction of several commemorative churches in Moscow, the most famous being Saint Basil's Cathedral on Red Square, whose distinctive design incorporates oriental architectural features in tribute to the conquest.

The fall of Kazan marked the beginning of a prolonged period of resistance along the Middle Volga, known as the Cheremis Wars. These uprisings, led by the Cheremis (Mari) and other local groups, challenged Moscow's attempts to consolidate its control over the region and were suppressed only with great difficulty. The First Cheremis War (1552–1556) concluded in 1557, by which time the Bashkirs had also accepted Ivan IV's authority, completing the first stage of Muscovite expansion into the Volga basin.

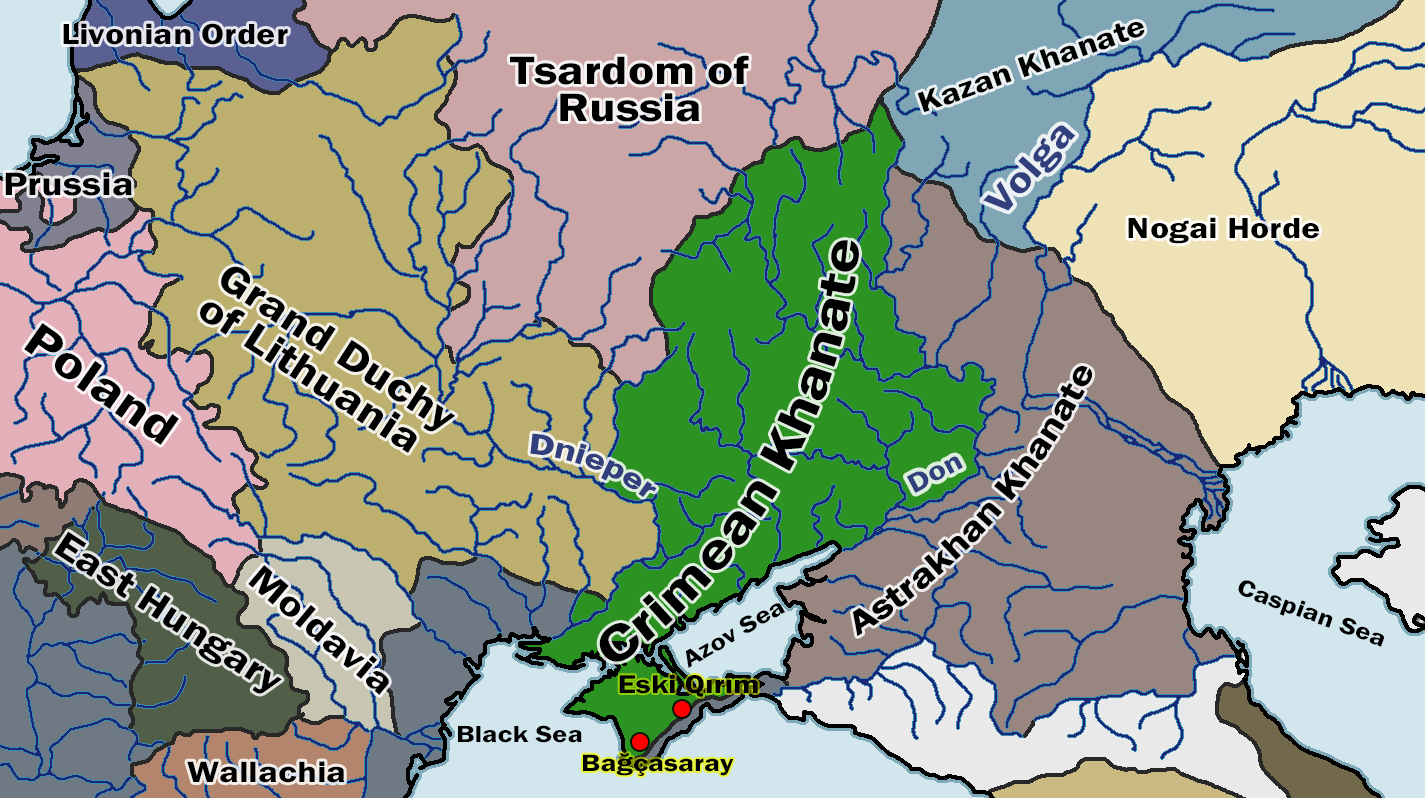
Khanates of Crimea, Astrakhan, and Kazan in 1550, before Ivan's expansion into the Volga basin

In campaigns in 1554 and 1556, Russian troops conquered the Astrakhan Khanate at the mouths of the Volga River, and the new Astrakhan fortress was built in 1558 by Ivan Vyrodkov to replace the old Tatar capital. The annexation of the Tatar khanates meant the conquest of vast territories, access to large markets and control of the entire length of the Volga River. According to Martin (2007), "the subjugation of the Muslim khanates transformed Muscovy into an empire and fundamentally altered the balance of power on the steppe."

After his conquest of Kazan, Ivan is said to have ordered the crescent, a symbol of Islam, to be placed underneath the Christian cross on the domes of Orthodox Christian churches.

=== Russo-Turkish War ===
In 1568, Grand Vizier Sokollu Mehmed Pasha, who was the real power in the administration of the Ottoman Empire under Sultan Selim, initiated the first encounter between the Ottoman Empire and its future northern rival. The results presaged the many disasters to come. A plan to unite the Volga and Don by a canal was detailed in Constantinople. In the summer of 1569, a large force under Kasim Pasha of 1,500 janissaries, 2,000 sipahis, and a few thousand azaps and akinjis were sent to lay siege to Astrakhan and to begin the canal works while an Ottoman fleet besieged Azov.

In early 1570, Ivan's ambassadors concluded a treaty at Constantinople that restored friendly relations between the sultan and the tsar. The envoys were directed to tell the sultan: "My Tsar is not an enemy of the Moslem faith. His servant Sain Bulat rules the Khanate of Kassimov; Prince Kaibula in Yuriev, Ibak in Suroshsk, and the Nogai Princes in Romanov.”

=== Livonian War ===
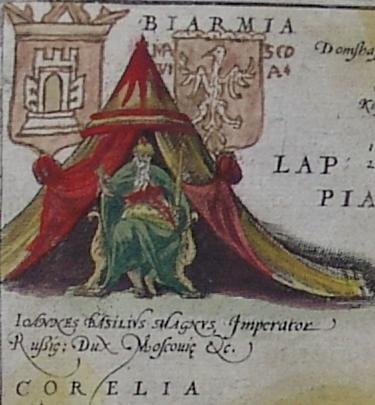
Ioannes Basilius Magnus Imperator Russiae, Dux Moscoviae, by Abraham Ortelius (1574)

In 1558, Ivan IV launched the Livonian War in an effort to secure access to the Baltic Sea and its lucrative trade routes. The conflict, which ultimately proved unsuccessful, lasted for 24 years and drew in multiple regional powers, including the Kingdom of Sweden, the Grand Duchy of Lithuania, the Kingdom of Poland, and the Teutonic Knights of Livonia.

The prolonged war devastated the Russian economy and, together with the internal turmoil caused by the oprichnina, severely disrupted governance and social stability. During the later stages of the conflict, the Union of Lublin (1569) united Lithuania and Poland into the Polish–Lithuanian Commonwealth, which soon gained a vigorous new monarch, Stephen Báthory, a skilled military commander supported by Russia's southern rival, the Ottoman Empire. By the 1570s, Ivan's realm found itself strategically encircled, pressured by two of the era's dominant powers to the west and south.

After rejecting several peace proposals from his adversaries, Ivan IV found himself in an increasingly unstable position by 1579. The protracted Livonian War had drained Russia's resources, while refugee movements from devastated border regions worsened the effects of a severe drought that struck the country at the same time. These overlapping crises contributed to widespread famine and epidemic outbreaks, resulting in heavy loss of life and further weakening the stability of the Russian state.

Báthory then launched a series of major offensives against Muscovy between 1579 and 1581, aiming to sever the Kingdom of Livonia from Russian control. In his first campaign of 1579, Báthory captured Polotsk with an army of approximately 22,000 men. During his second offensive in 1580, he seized Velikiye Luki with a force estimated at 29,000 troops. The following year, in 1581, he initiated the Siege of Pskov with an army reportedly numbering around 100,000 men, marking the largest engagement of the war. Meanwhile, in the north, Narva—in present-day Estonia—was recaptured by Sweden in the same year, further eroding Muscovy’s positions along the Baltic frontier.

Unlike Sweden and the Polish–Lithuanian Commonwealth, Frederick II of Denmark struggled to sustain Denmark's involvement in the Livonian War. In 1580, he reached an agreement with John III of Sweden, transferring Denmark's titular claims to Livonia to the Swedish crown. Muscovy formally recognised Polish–Lithuanian control of Livonia only in 1582, following the Truce of Yam-Zapolsky. After the death of Magnus of Livonia, Frederick's brother and a former ally of Ivan IV, in 1583, Polish forces occupied Magnus's holdings in the Duchy of Courland. Facing limited influence in the region, Frederick II sold his hereditary claims. By 1585, Denmark had effectively withdrawn from Livonia, retaining only the island of Saaremaa in the Baltic Sea.

The Livonian War concluded in 1583 with the Truce of Plussa between Muscovy and Sweden, following the earlier Truce of Yam-Zapolsky (1582) with the Polish–Lithuanian Commonwealth. The twin agreements effectively ended Muscovy's presence in Livonia and deprived it of direct access to the Baltic Sea. The war established Sweden and Poland–Lithuania as the dominant powers in the eastern Baltic region, while Muscovy’s defeat marked the end of Ivan IV's expansionist ambitions in the northwest. The economic exhaustion and social disruption that followed contributed to the political instability of the late 16th century, laying part of the groundwork for the Time of Troubles that engulfed Russia in the early 17th century.

=== Crimean raids ===
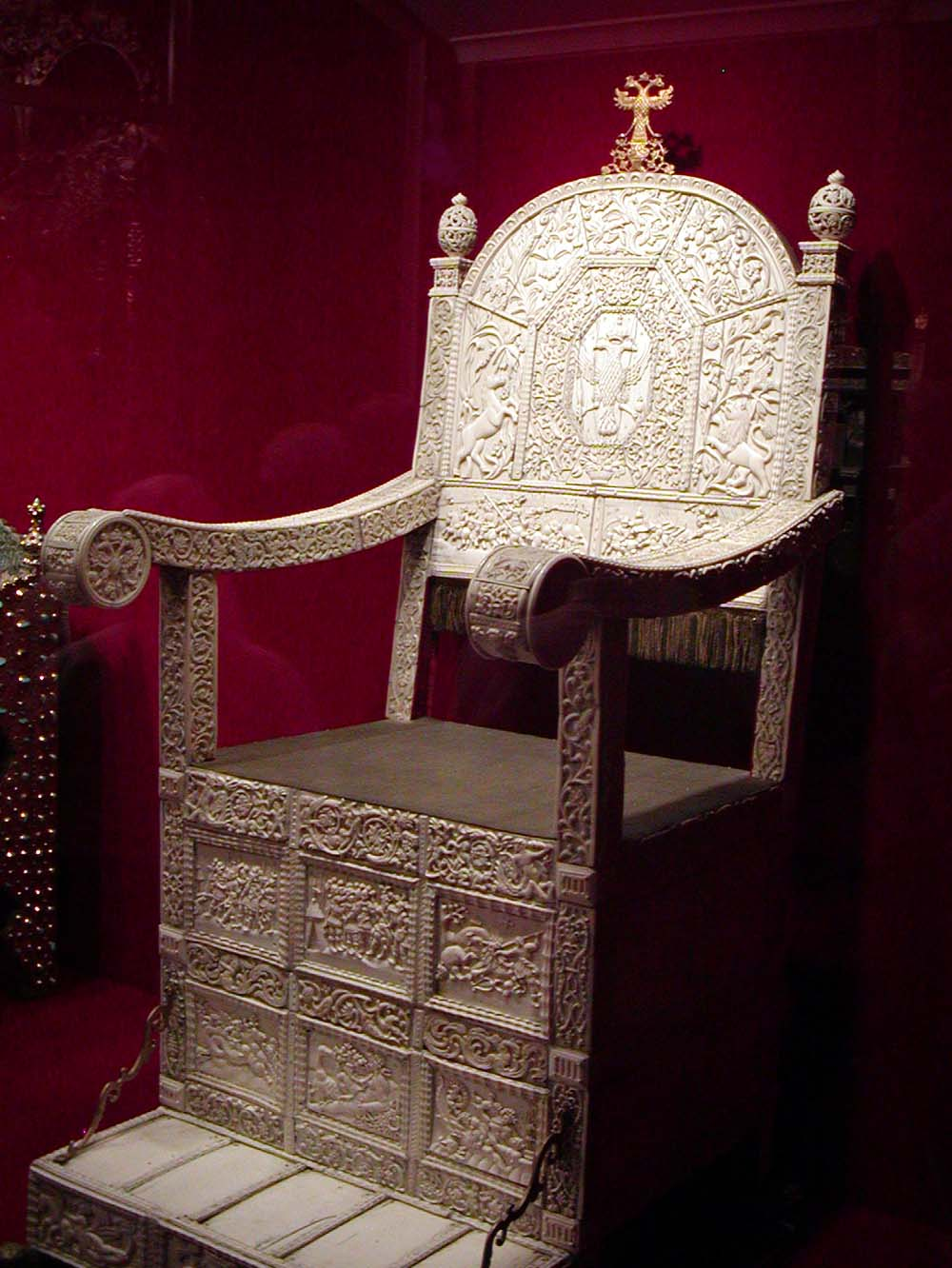
Ivan's throne (ivory, metal, wood)

In the later years of Ivan's reign, the southern borders of Muscovy were disturbed by Crimean Tatars, mainly to capture slaves. Devlet I Giray, Khan of the Crimean Khanate, conducted several raids into Muscovite territory during the late 16th century. In 1571, a Crimean–Ottoman army of about 40,000 men launched a large-scale invasion of the Moscow region. Because most Russian forces were engaged in the ongoing Livonian War, the capital was defended by a garrison of only around 6,000 troops, insufficient to resist the Tatar advance. The Crimean force entered Moscow virtually unopposed, burning much of the city and its surrounding settlements in what became known as the Fire of Moscow. Contemporary and modern estimates of the number of people killed in the fire vary widely, ranging from 10,000 to 80,000.

In the aftermath of the 1571 raid, Ivan IV sought to buy peace from Devlet I Giray by offering to relinquish Russian claims to Astrakhan in favor of the Crimean Khanate. However, the proposed concession was purely diplomatic and was never implemented, as Astrakhan remained under Russian control. The devastation of Moscow deeply angered Ivan, who began preparing for a renewed confrontation with the Crimean Tatars. Between 1571 and 1572, extensive defensive preparations were undertaken on his orders. In addition to reinforcing the Zasechnaya cherta (a line of fortified earthworks and wooden walls), a new system of advanced fortifications was constructed beyond the Oka River, then forming the southern frontier of the Russian state.

The following year, Devlet launched another raid on Moscow, now with a numerous horde, reinforced by Turkish janissaries equipped with firearms and cannons. The Russian army, led by Prince Mikhail Vorotynsky, was half the size but was experienced and supported by streltsy, equipped with modern firearms and gulyay-gorods. In addition, it was no longer divided into two parts (the oprichnina and zemsky), unlike during the 1571 defeat. On 27 July, the horde broke through the defensive line along the Oka River and moved towards Moscow. The Russian troops did not have time to intercept it, but the regiment of Prince Khvorostinin vigorously attacked the Tatars from the rear. The Khan stopped only 30 km from Moscow and brought down his entire army back on the Russians, who managed to take up defense near the village of Molodi. After several days of heavy fighting, Mikhail Vorotynsky with the main part of the army flanked the Tatars and dealt a sudden blow on 2 August. Khvorostinin made a sortie from the fortifications. The Tatars were completely defeated and fled. The next year, Ivan, who had sat out in distant Novgorod during the battle, killed Mikhail Vorotynsky.

=== Conquest of Siberia ===
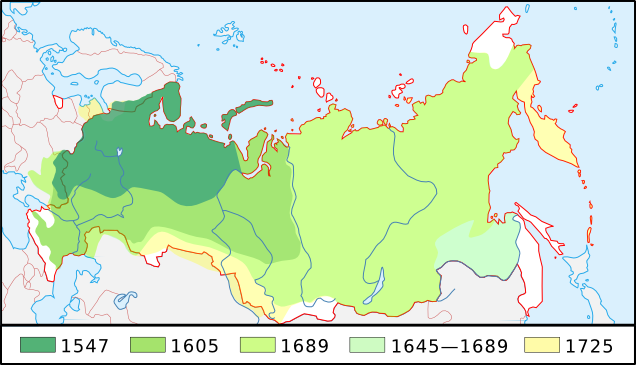
Russian expansion into Siberia dates back to the 16th century, when Ivan granted the Stroganov family permission to conquer the Khanate of Sibir. Area conquered by Ivan IV in dark green.

During the reign of Ivan IV, Russia began its large-scale expansion and colonization of Siberia, laying the foundations for future eastward conquest. In 1555, shortly after the conquest of Kazan, the Siberian khan Yadegar and Khan Ismail of the Nogai Horde pledged their allegiance to Ivan in hopes of gaining his support against rival steppe powers. However, Yadegar failed to deliver the full tribute he had promised to Moscow, and Ivan took no action to assist his struggling vassal. In 1563, Yadegar was overthrown and killed by Khan Kuchum, who consolidated power in the Khanate of Sibir and refused to acknowledge Moscow’s authority or pay tribute.

In 1558, Ivan IV granted the Stroganov family, a prominent merchant dynasty, a charter to colonize the rich lands along the Kama River. In 1574, their holdings were expanded to include territories beyond the Ural Mountains, along the Tura and Tobol. The Stroganovs were also authorized to construct fortified settlements along the Ob and Irtysh, facilitating trade and defense in the region.

By around 1577, facing frequent raids from the forces of the Siberian Khan Kuchum, the Stroganovs enlisted the Cossack leader Yermak Timofeyevich to defend their frontier lands. This alliance would soon evolve into the first Russian-led expedition into Siberia, marking the beginning of the region’s gradual conquest and incorporation into the Russian state.

In 1580, Yermak started his conquest of Siberia. With some 540 Cossacks, he started to penetrate territories that were tributary to Kuchum. Yermak pressured and persuaded the various family-based tribes to change their loyalties and to become tributaries of Russia. Some agreed voluntarily because they were offered better terms than with Kuchum, but others were forced. He also established distant forts in the newly conquered lands. The campaign was successful, and the Cossacks managed to defeat the Siberian army in the Battle of Chuvash Cape, but Yermak still needed reinforcements. He sent an envoy to Ivan the Terrible with a message that proclaimed Yermak-conquered Siberia to be part of Russia, to the dismay of the Stroganovs, who had planned to keep Siberia for themselves. Ivan agreed to reinforce the Cossacks with his streltsy, but the detachment sent to Siberia died of starvation without any benefit. The Cossacks were defeated by the local peoples, Yermak died, and the survivors immediately left Siberia. Only in 1586, two years after the death of Ivan, would the Russians manage to gain a foothold in Siberia by founding the city of Tyumen.

== Personal life ==
=== Marriages and children ===
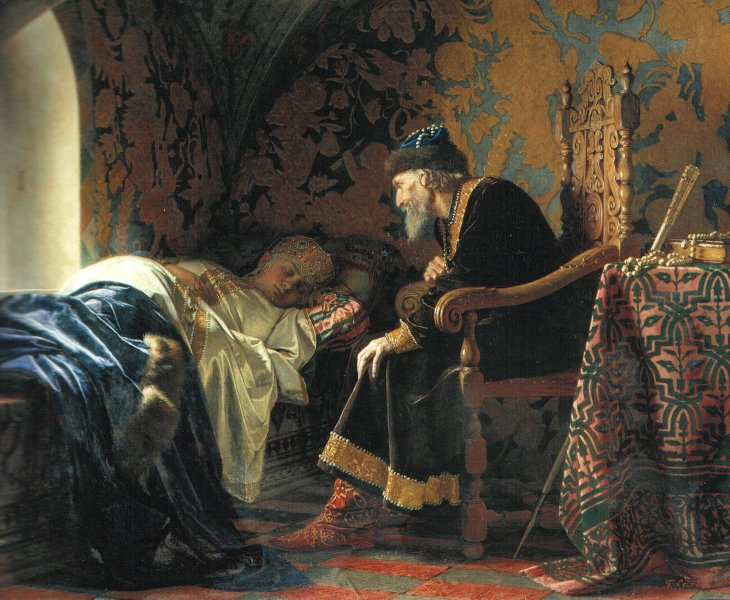
Tsar Ivan IV admires his sixth wife Vasilisa Melentyeva. 1875 painting by Grigory Sedov.

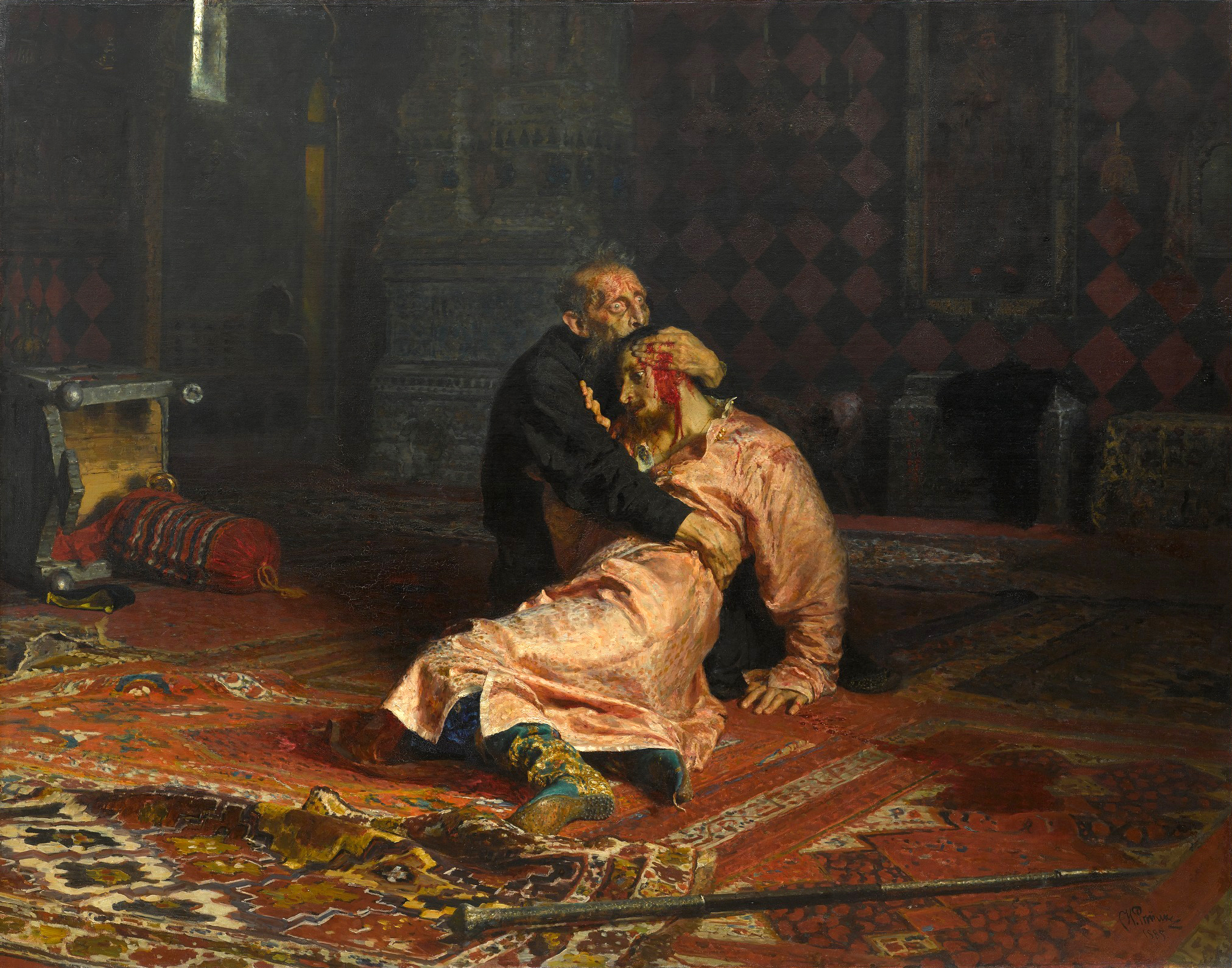
Ivan the Terrible and His Son Ivan. 1885 painting by Ilya Repin

Ivan the Terrible had at least six (possibly eight) wives, although only four of them were recognised by the Church. Three of them were allegedly poisoned by his enemies or by rival aristocratic families who wanted to promote their daughters to be his brides.

Ivan IV had nine children, though not all survived infancy. His offspring were born from multiple marriages, most prominently with his first wife, Anastasia Romanovna, who bore him several heirs. Of his sons, Ivan Ivanovich, Feodor I, and Dmitry of Uglich are the best known. Only Feodor survived to inherit the throne, reigning from 1584 to 1598.

In 1580, his heir, Ivan Ivanovich, married Yelena Sheremeteva from the Sheremetev noble family, which was a rare instance of the daughter of a boyar marrying into the dynasty.

On 19 November 1581, Ivan chastised Yelena for being unsuitably dressed, considering her advanced pregnancy, leading to an altercation with his son Ivan Ivanovich. Historians generally believe that Ivan killed his son in a fit of rage, with the argument ending after the elder Ivan fatally struck his son in the head with his pointed staff. Yelena also suffered a miscarriage within hours of the incident.

The event is depicted in the celebrated Ilya Repin painting Ivan the Terrible and His Son Ivan (1885), which captures the tsar’s immediate horror and remorse after the fatal blow.

==== Confirmed marriages ====
1. Anastasia Romanovna (married 3 February 1547 – 7 August 1560; died):
  - Tsarevna Anna Ivanovna (10 August 1548 – 20 July 1550)
  - Tsarevna Maria Ivanovna (17 March 1551 – young)
  - Tsarevich Dmitri Ivanovich (October 1552 – 26 June 1553)
  - Tsarevich Ivan Ivanovich (28 March 1554 – 19 November 1581)
  - Tsarevna Eudoxia Ivanovna (26 February 1556 – June 1558)
  - Tsar Feodor I of Russia (31 May 1557 – 6 January 1598)
2. Maria Temryukovna (married 21 August 1561 – 1 September 1569; died):
  - Tsarevich Vasili Ivanovich (21 March 1563 – 3 May 1563)
3. Marfa Sobakina (married 28 October 1571 – 13 November 1571; died)
4. Anna Koltovskaya (married 29 April 1572 – 31 May 1572; sent to monastery); this was the last of his church-authorized weddings and she was later canonized as Saint Daria.
5. Anna Vasilchikova (married between 7–30 January 1575 or September–October 1574; sent to monastery in August–September 1576)
6. Maria Nagaya (6 September 1580; widow):
  - Tsarevich Dmitri Ivanovich (19 October 1582 – 15 May 1591); he was later canonized as Saint Right-Believing Demetrius of Uglich and Moscow, tsarevich.

==== Unconfirmed marriages ====
1. Vasilisa Melentyeva (?–1579) (existence disputed)
2. Maria Dolgorukaya (1580) (existence disputed)

Some contemporary and later foreign accounts alleged that Ivan IV maintained a close relationship with the courtier Fyodor Basmanov, a member of the oprichnina guard. According to these reports, when the boyar Dmitry Ovchinin mocked Basmanov over his intimacy with the tsar, Ivan allegedly killed Ovchinin in a fit of rage. However, modern historians regard these claims—recorded mainly by hostile or second-hand sources—as anecdotal and unsubstantiated by Russian chronicles.

=== Arts ===
Ivan was a poet and a composer of considerable talent. His Orthodox liturgical hymn, "Stichiron No. 1 in Honor of St. Peter", and fragments of his letters were set to music by the Soviet composer Rodion Shchedrin. The recording, the first Soviet-produced CD, was released in 1988 to mark the millennium of Christianity in Russia.

=== Letters ===
D. S. Mirsky (1958) called Ivan "a pamphleteer of genius". The exchange of letters attributed to Ivan and his former vassal Andrey Kurbsky, who defected to Lithuania in 1564, is often said to be the only existing source on Ivan's personality that could provide crucial information on his reign, but Harvard professor Edward L. Keenan (1971) has argued that the letters are 17th-century forgeries. That contention, however, has not been widely accepted (exceptions include Donald Ostrowski and Brian Boeck); most other scholars, such as John Fennell and Ruslan Skrynnikov, have continued to argue for their authenticity. The most frequently cited argument by proponents of authenticity is the 1987 Morozov article on a manuscript, variously dated to 1594–95 or the 1620s, of the first Kurbskii letter to Ivan, which Martin (2007) asserted "has substantially strengthened the argument for the authenticity of the correspondence". Skeptics point out that Morozov later acknowledged the 1620s as the date of composition, and that he never followed-up his preliminary findings with a separate study that he called for.

== Religion ==
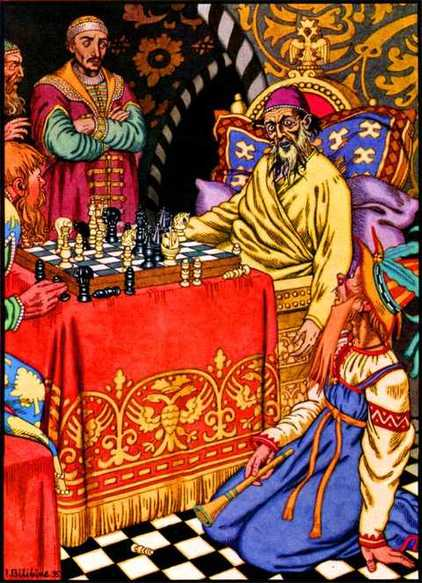
Death of Ivan the Terrible by Ivan Bilibin (1935)

Ivan was a devoted follower of Orthodox Christianity but in his own specific manner. He placed the most emphasis on defending the divine right of the ruler to unlimited power under God. Some scholars explain the sadistic and brutal deeds of Ivan the Terrible with the religious concepts of the 16th century, which included drowning and roasting people alive or torturing victims with boiling or freezing water, corresponding to the torments of hell. That was consistent with Ivan's view of being God's representative on Earth with a sacred right and duty to punish. He may also have been inspired by the model of Archangel Michael with the idea of divine punishment.

Despite the absolute prohibition of the Church for even the fourth marriage, Ivan had seven wives. Even while his seventh wife was alive, he was negotiating to marry Mary Hastings, a distant relative of Queen Elizabeth I of England. Polygamy was also prohibited by the Church. Still, Ivan planned to "put his wife away". Ivan freely interfered in church affairs by ousting Metropolitan Philip and ordering him to be killed and accusing of treason and deposing the second-oldest hierarch, Novgorod Archbishop Pimen. Many monks were tortured to death during the Massacre of Novgorod.

In the conquered Khanates of Khazan and Astrakhan, Ivan was somewhat tolerant of Islam. This was largely to avoid a conflict with the Ottoman sultan over control of newly conquered Tatar regions. He considered these conquests to be a Christian victory. He was notable for his antisemitism. For example, after the capture of Polotsk, all unconverted Jews were ordered to be drowned, despite their role in the city's economy.

== Death ==
Ivan died from a stroke while he was playing chess with Bogdan Belsky on 28 March [O.S. 18 March] 1584. Upon Ivan's death, the Russian throne was left to his middle son, Feodor, a weak-minded figure. Feodor died childless in 1598, which ushered in the Time of Troubles. He was buried at the Cathedral of the Archangel in Moscow.

== Appearance ==
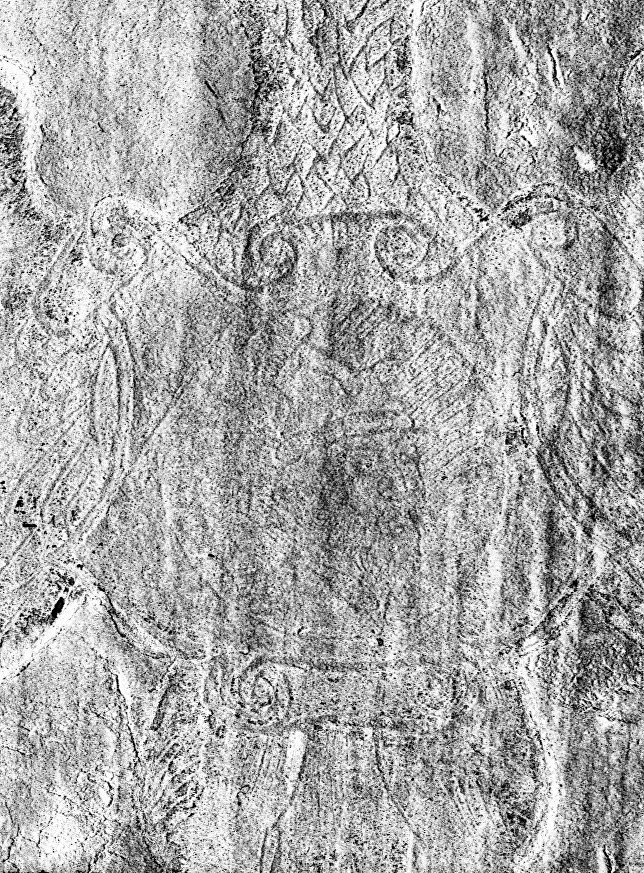
The only authentic lifetime portrait of Ivan IV is embossed on the binding of the first printed Apostle of 1564.

Little is known about Ivan's appearance, as virtually all existing portraits were made after his death and contain uncertain amounts of artist's impression. In 1567, the ambassador Daniel Prinz von Buchau said about Ivan that: "He is very tall. His body is full of strength and quite thick, his large eyes, which constantly run around, observe everything carefully. His beard is red with a slight shade of black, quite long and thick, but like most Russians, he shaves his hair with a razor".

According to Ivan Katyryov-Rostovsky, the son-in-law of Michael I of Russia, Ivan had an unpleasant face with a long and crooked nose. He was tall and athletically built, with broad shoulders and a narrow waist.

In 1963, the graves of Ivan and his sons were excavated and examined by Soviet scientists. Chemical and structural analysis of his remains disproved earlier suggestions that Ivan suffered from syphilis or that he was poisoned by arsenic or strangled. At the time of his death, he was 178 cm tall (5 ft. 10 in.) and weighed 85–90 kg (187–198 lb.). His body was rather asymmetrical, had a large amount of osteophytes uncharacteristic of his age and contained excessive concentration of mercury. Researchers concluded that Ivan was athletically built in his youth but, in his last years, had developed various bone diseases and could barely move. They attributed the high mercury content in his body to his use of ointments to heal his joints.

== Title ==
Ivan had the following title towards the end of his reign:

The Great Sovereign, Tsar and Grand Prince Ivan Vasilyevich of all Russia, Vladimir, Moscow, Novgorod, Tsar of Kazan, Astrakhan, Lord of Pskov, Grand Prince of Smolensk, Tver, Yugorsk, Perm, Vyatka, Bolgar and others, Sovereign and Grand Prince of Novgorod of the Lower Lands, Chernigov, Ryazan, Polotsk, Rostov, Yaroslavl, Beloozero, Udoria, Obdoria, Kondia and Dominator of all the Siberian Lands and Northern Countries, Lord of the Land of Livonia.

Kazan was added to Ivan's title in 1553 and Astrakhan in 1554. The titles "tsar of Kazan, tsar of Astrakhan" first appeared in 1556. The title "master of all the Siberian lands" first appeared in 1555, and from 1582, was written as "dominator of all the Siberian lands and northern countries". (Note: The "country" should be understood as Norrbotten, which was added as a result of the Russo-Swedish War of 1554–1557.) During the Livonian War, Livonia first appeared in his title in 1558. Polotsk was also included following its capture in 1562. Despite Russia's defeat in the Livonian War, the title of Livonia was not abandoned.

In English, Ivan's title of tsar was often translated as "emperor" from the first visit of Richard Chancellor to Moscow in 1553. For example: "We, greatest Ivan Vassilleviche by the Grace of God Emperor of all Russia and Great Duke". However, the title was not consistently translated as "emperor", such as in 1582: "The Great Lord, King and Great Duke John the sonne of Vasili of all Russia...". (Note: May 1582. Instructions of the Emb-ra of Russia.)

== Legacy ==
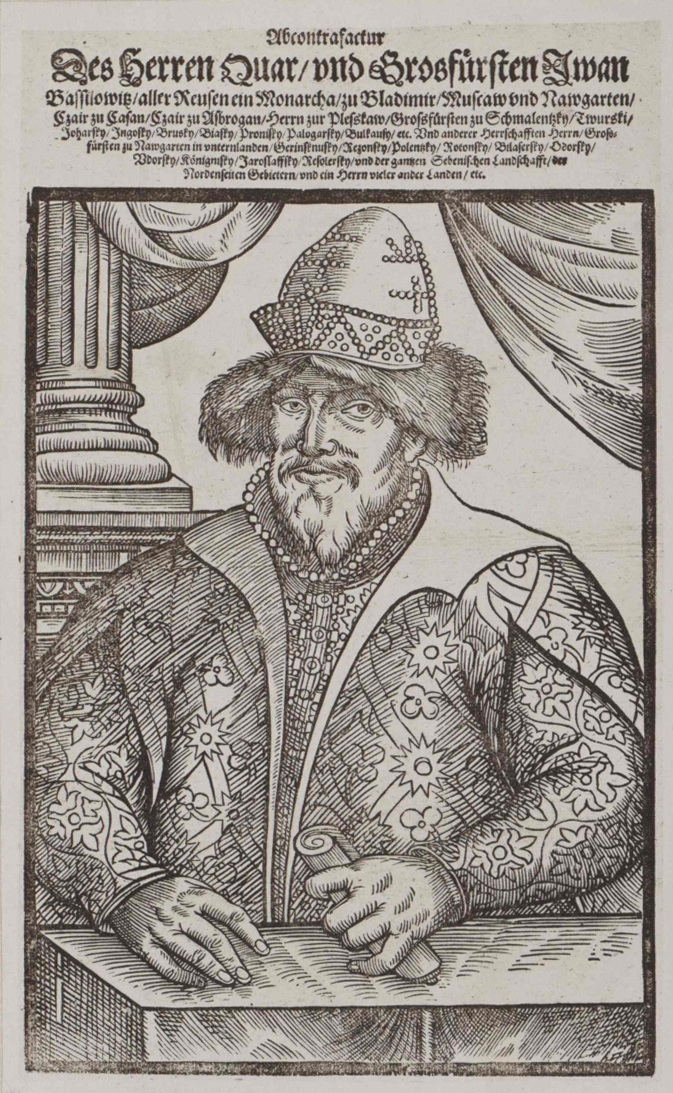
16th-century German engraving of Ivan IV

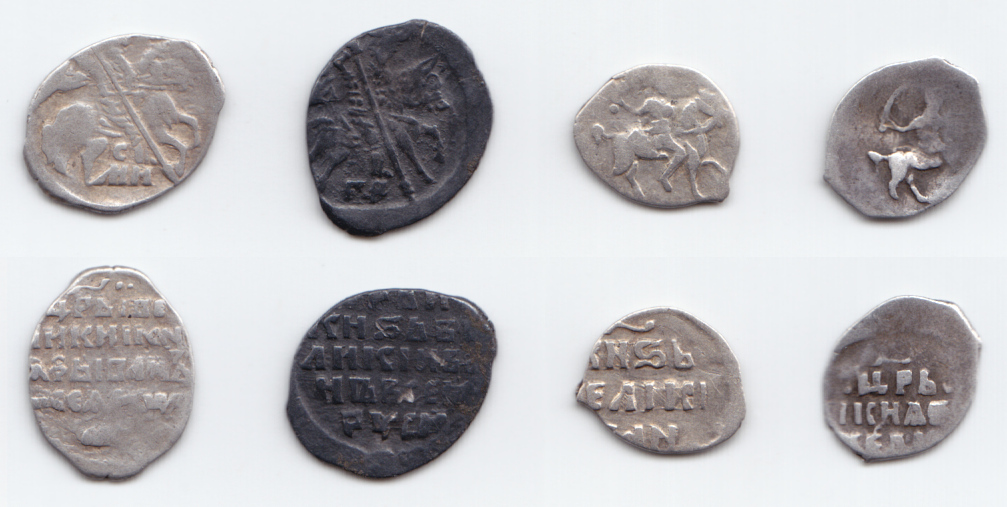
Coins of Ivan IV: kopecks and dengas, in silver.

Ivan completely altered Russia's governmental structure, establishing the character of modern Russian political organisation. Ivan's creation of the oprichnina, answerable only to him, afforded him personal protection and curtailed the traditional powers and rights of the boyars. Henceforth, tsarist autocracy and despotism would lie at the heart of the Russian state. Ivan bypassed the mestnichestvo system and offered positions of power to his supporters among the minor gentry. The empire's local administration combined both locally and centrally appointed officials; the system proved durable and practical and sufficiently flexible to tolerate later modification.

Ivan's expedition against Poland failed at a military level, but it helped extend Russia's trade, political and cultural links with other European states. Peter the Great built on those connections in his bid to make Russia a major European power. At Ivan's death, the empire encompassed the Caspian to the southwest and Western Siberia to the east. His southern conquests ignited several conflicts with the expansionist Ottoman Empire, whose territories were thus confined to the Balkans and the Black Sea regions.

Ivan's management of Russia's economy had negative consequences, both in his lifetime and afterwards. He had inherited a government in debt, and in an effort to raise more revenue for his expansionist wars, he instituted a series of taxes on the peasantry and urban population. Martin (2007) stated: "The reign of Ivan IV the Terrible was, in short, a disaster for Muscovy. (...) his subjects were impoverished, his economic resources depleted, his army weakened, and his realm militarily defeated. (...) By the time Ivan IV the Terrible died in 1584, Muscovy (...) was on the brink of ruin".

== Posthumous reputation ==
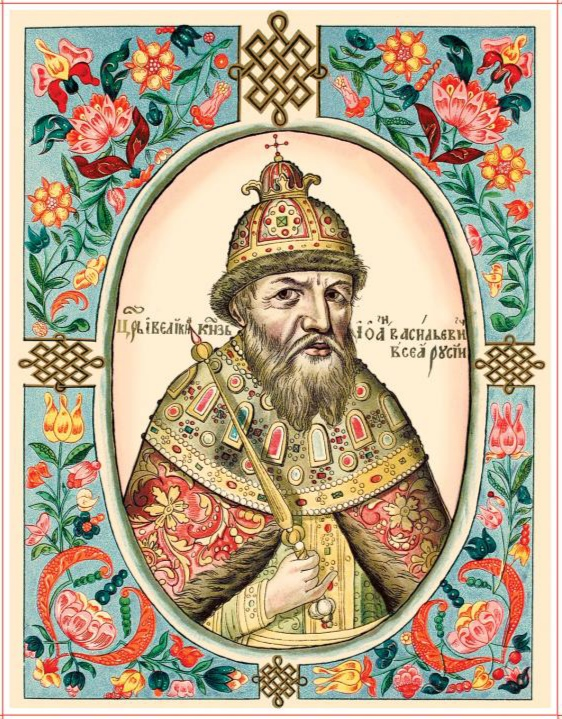
Portrait of Ivan IV in the Tsarsky titulyarnik, 1672

Ivan's notorious outbursts and autocratic whims helped characterise the position of tsar as one accountable to no earthly authority but only to God. Tsarist absolutism faced few serious challenges until the 19th century. The earliest and most influential account of his reign prior to 1917 was by the historian Nikolay Karamzin, who described Ivan as a "tormentor" of his people, particularly from 1560, though even after that date Karamzin believed there was a mix of "good" and "evil" in his character. In 1922, the historian Robert Wipper wrote a biography that reassessed Ivan as a monarch "who loved the ordinary people" and praised his agrarian reforms.

In the 1920s, Mikhail Pokrovsky, who dominated the study of history in the Soviet Union, attributed the success of the oprichnina to their being on the side of the small state owners and townsfolk in a decades-long class struggle against the large landowners, and downgraded Ivan's role to that of the instrument of the emerging Russian bourgeoisie. But in February 1941, the poet Boris Pasternak observantly remarked in a letter to his cousin that "the new cult, openly proselytized, is Ivan the Terrible, the Oprichnina, the brutality." Joseph Stalin, who had read Wipper's biography, had decided that Soviet historians should praise the role of strong leaders, such as Ivan, Alexander Nevsky and Peter the Great, who had strengthened and expanded Russia.

A consequence was that the writer Alexei Tolstoy began work on a stage version of Ivan's life, and Sergei Eisenstein began what was to be a three-part film tribute to Ivan. Both projects were personally supervised by Stalin, at a time when the Soviet Union was engaged in a war with Nazi Germany. He read the scripts of Tolstoy's play and the first of Eisenstein's films in tandem after the Battle of Kursk in 1943, praised Eisenstein's version but rejected Tolstoy's. It took Tolstoy until 1944 to write a version that satisfied Stalin. Eisenstein's success with Ivan the Terrible Part 1 was not repeated with the follow-up, The Boyar's Revolt, which angered Stalin because it portrayed a man suffering pangs of conscience. Stalin told Eisenstein: "Ivan the Terrible was very cruel. You can show that he was cruel, but you have to show why it was essential to be cruel. One of Ivan the Terrible's mistakes was that he didn't finish off the five major families." In popular culture, Night at the Museum: Battle of the Smithsonian is a 2009 American fantasy comedy film directed by Shawn Levy, which features Christopher Guest as Ivan the Terrible.

In post-Soviet Russia, there was a campaign to seek the granting of sainthood to Ivan IV, but the Russian Orthodox Church opposed the idea, due to his execution of Metropolitan bishop Philip II, who had been canonised in 1652. The first statue of Ivan the Terrible was officially open in Oryol, Russia, in 2016. Formally, the statue was unveiled in honor of the 450th anniversary of the founding of Oryol, a Russian city of about 310,000 that was established as a fortress to defend Moscow's southern borders. Informally, there was a political subtext, as Opposition figures speculated that Ivan the Terrible's rehabilitation echoes Stalin's era. The erection of the statue was widely covered in international media like The Guardian, The Washington Post, Politico, and others. The Russian Orthodox Church officially supported the erection of the monument.

== See also ==
- Domostroy
- Family tree of Russian monarchs
- Crisis of the late 16th century in Russia

== Notes ==
Ivan the Terrible Rurik Born: 3 September 1530 Died: 28 March 1584
Regnal titles
Preceded by Vasili III	Grand Prince of Moscow; 3 December 1533 – 16 January 1547	Tsardom created
Tsardom created	Tsar of Russia; 16 January 1547 – 28 March 1584	Succeeded by Feodor I
