= Polish Golden Age =

Period of Polish history

Coordinates: 50°03′N 19°56′E

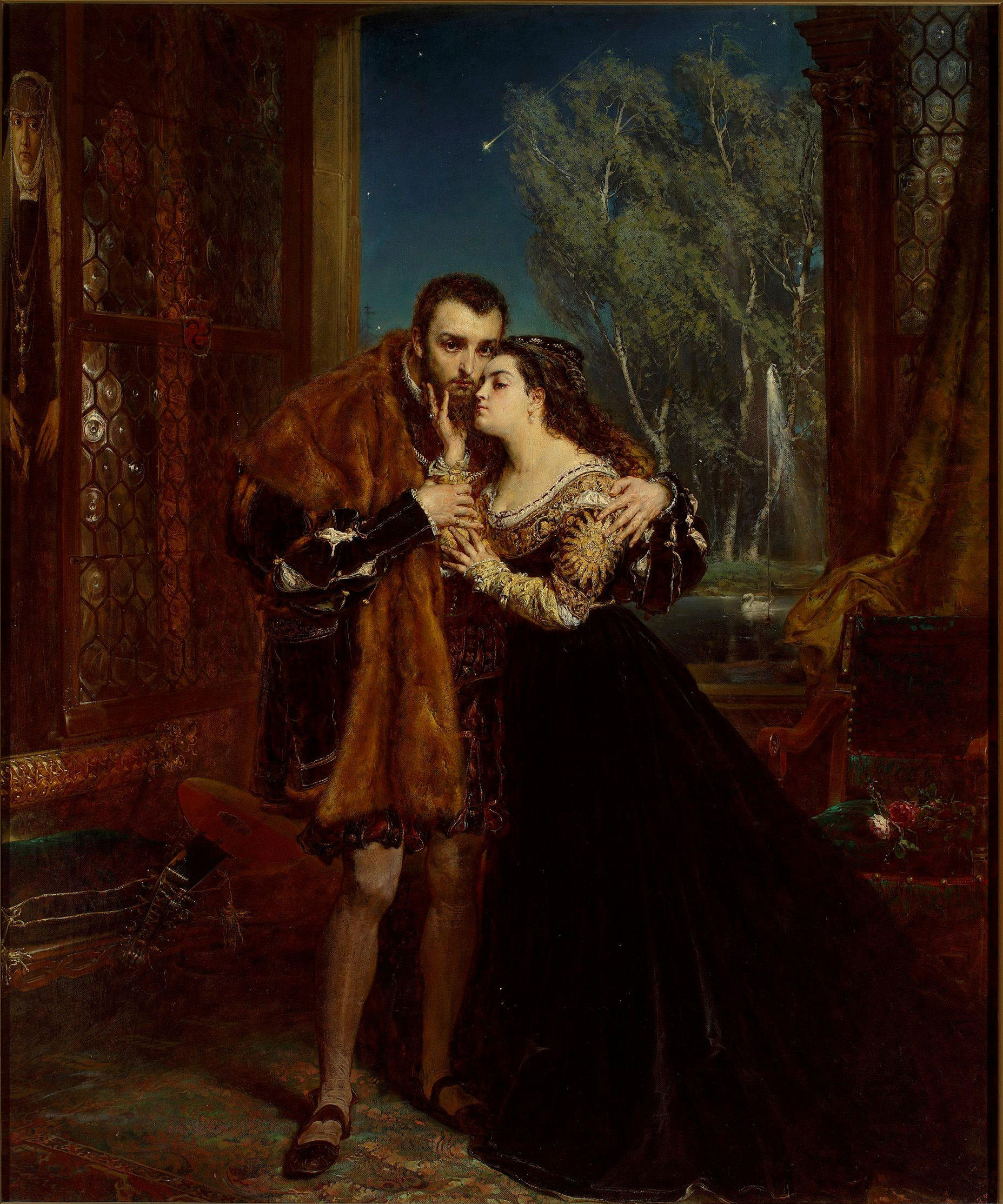
King Sigismund II Augustus and Queen Barbara Radziwiłł in Vilnius by Jan Matejko

The Polish Golden Age (Polish: Złoty Wiek Polski [ˈzwɔ.tɘ ˈvjɛk ˈpɔl.ski]) was the Renaissance period in the Kingdom of Poland and subsequently in the Polish–Lithuanian Commonwealth, which started in the late 15th century. Historians argue that the Polish Golden Age ended by the mid-17th century, when Poland was ravaged by the Khmelnytsky Uprising (1648–57) and by the Swedish and Russian invasion. During its Golden Age, the Commonwealth became one of the largest kingdoms of Europe and at its peak stretched from modern-day Estonia in the north to Moldavia in the south and from Moscow in the east to Brandenburg in the west.

In the 16th century the Polish–Lithuanian Commonwealth grew to 1 million km^{2}, with a population of 11 million. It prospered from its enormous grain, wood, salt, and cloth trade with Western Europe via the Baltic Sea ports of Danzig (Gdańsk), Elbing (Elbląg), Riga, Memel (Klaipėda), and Königsberg (Kaliningrad). The Commonwealth's major cities also included Poznań, Kraków, Warsaw, Lwów (Lviv), Wilno (Vilnius), Thorn (Toruń), and, for a time, Kiev and Smolensk. The Commonwealth army was able to defend the realm from foreign invasion, and also participated in aggressive campaigns against Poland's neighbors. As voluntary Polonization followed in unified territories, the Polish language became the lingua franca of the Commonwealth.

During its Golden Age, the Commonwealth was regarded as one of the most powerful states in Europe. It had a unique system of government, known as Golden Liberty, in which all the nobility (szlachta), regardless of economic status, were considered equal and enjoyed extensive legal rights and privileges. One of the system's features was the liberum veto, used for the first time in 1669. The nobility, comprising szlachta and its magnates, made up 8–10% of the Commonwealth's population.

== Culture of Polish Renaissance ==
=== Literacy, education and patronage of intellectual endeavors ===
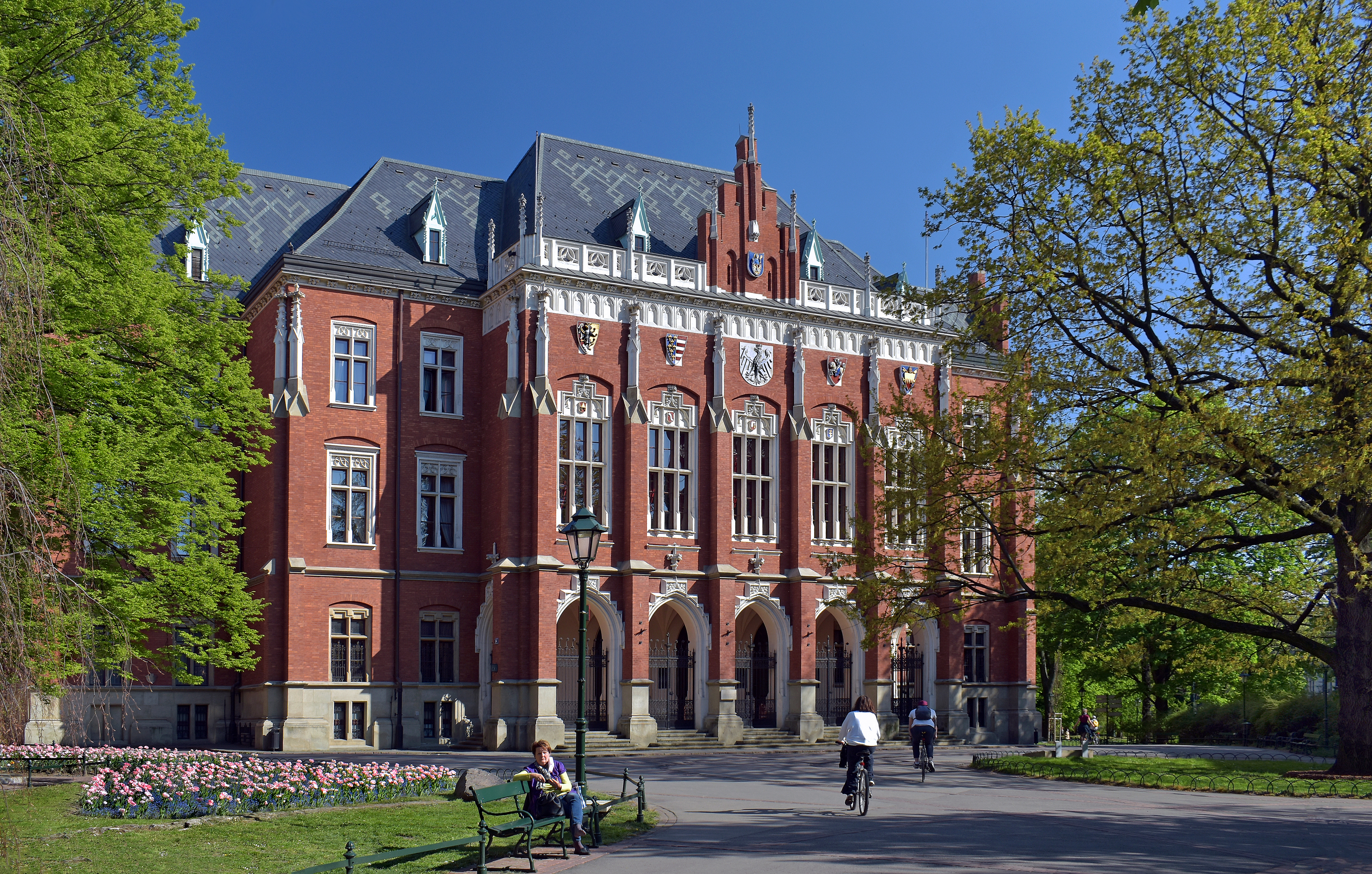
Jagiellonian University in Kraków

The Polish printing industry began in Kraków in 1473, and by the early 17th century there were about 20 printing houses within the Commonwealth: eight in Kraków, the rest mostly in Danzig, Thorn and Zamość. The Academy of Kraków possessed well-stocked libraries; smaller collections were increasingly common at noble courts, schools, and in townspeople's households. Illiteracy levels were falling, as by the end of the 16th century almost every parish ran a school.

The Lubrański Academy, an institution of higher learning, was established in Poznań in 1519. The Reformation resulted in the establishment of a number of gymnasiums, academically oriented secondary schools, some of international renown, as the Protestant denominations wanted to attract supporters by offering high quality education. The Catholic reaction was the creation of Jesuit colleges of comparable quality. The Kraków University in turn responded with humanist program gymnasiums of its own.

The university itself experienced a period of prominence at the turn of the 15th/16th century, when especially the mathematics, astronomy and geography faculties attracted numerous students from abroad. Latin, Greek, Hebrew and their literatures were likewise popular. By the mid 16th century the institution entered a crisis stage, and by the early 17th century regressed into Counter-reformational conformism. The Jesuits took advantage of the infighting and established in 1579 a university college in Vilnius, but their efforts aimed at taking over the Academy of Kraków were unsuccessful. Under the circumstances many elected to pursue their studies abroad.

Sigismund I the Old, who built the presently existing Wawel Renaissance castle, and his son Sigismund II Augustus, supported intellectual and artistic activities and surrounded themselves with the creative elite. Their patronage example was followed by ecclesiastic and lay feudal lords, and by patricians in major towns.

=== Science ===
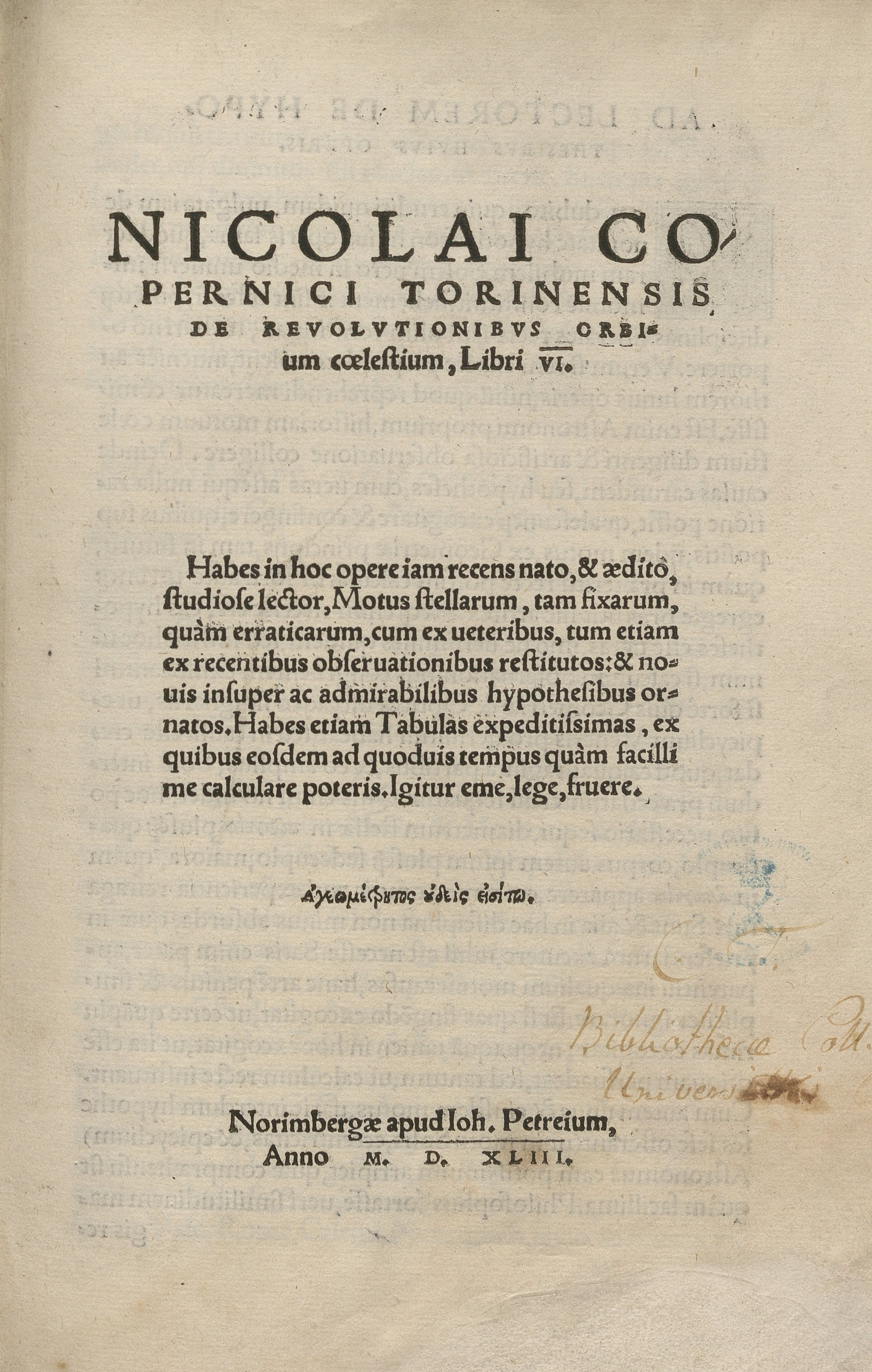
De revolutionibus orbium coelestium, the seminal work on the heliocentric theory of Renaissance astronomer Nicolaus Copernicus (1473–1543)

Polish science reached its culmination in the first half of the 16th century as the Aristotelian point of view was criticized and more rational explanations were sought. De revolutionibus orbium coelestium, published by Nicolaus Copernicus in Nuremberg in 1543, shook up the traditional value system extended into understanding of the physical universe, dispensing with the Ptolemaic anthropocentric model and setting free the expansion of scientific inquiry. Generally the prominent scientists of the period resided in many different regions of the country, and increasingly, the majority were of urban, rather than noble origin.

Copernicus made many contributions to science and the arts. His scientific creativity was inspired at the University of Kraków, he later studied at Italian universities. Copernicus wrote Latin poetry, developed an economic theory, functioned as a cleric-administrator, a political activist in Prussian sejmiks, and he led the defense of Allenstein (Olsztyn) against the forces of Albrecht Hohenzollern. As an astronomer, he worked on his scientific theory for many years at Frauenburg (Frombork), where he died.

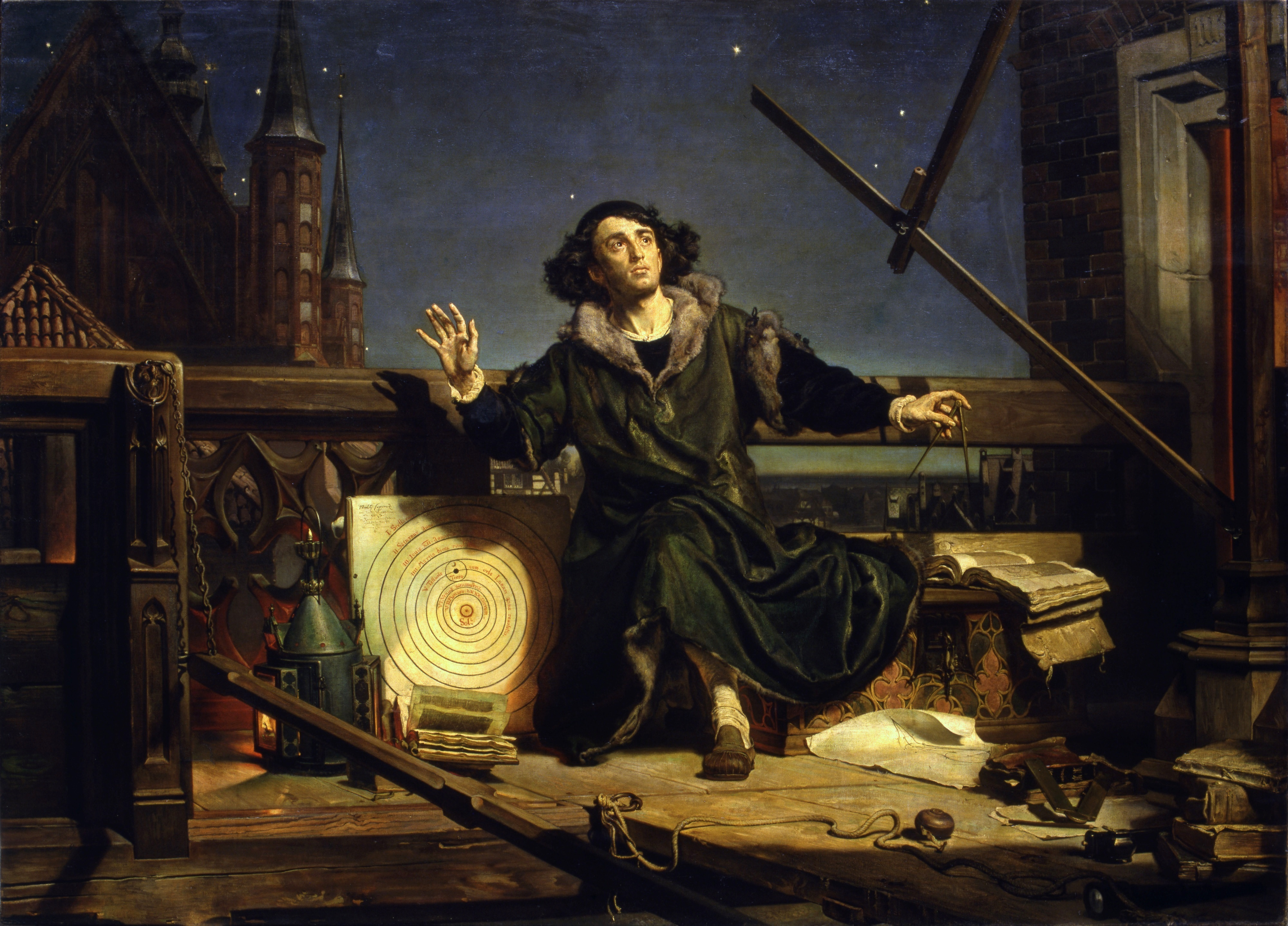
Nicolaus Copernicus, one of the most important astronomers in history

Josephus Struthius became famous as a physician and medical researcher. Bernard Wapowski was a pioneer of Polish cartography. Maciej Miechowita, a rector at the Kraków Academy, published in 1517 Tractatus de duabus Sarmatiis, a treatise on the geography of the East, an area in which Polish investigators provided first-hand expertise for the rest of Europe.

Andrzej Frycz Modrzewski was one of the greatest theorists of political thought in Renaissance Europe. His most famous work, On the Improvement of the Commonwealth, was published in Kraków in 1551. Modrzewski criticized the feudal societal relations and proposed broad realistic reforms. He postulated that all social classes should be subjected to the law to the same degree, and wanted to moderate the existing inequities. Modrzewski, an influential and often translated author, was a passionate proponent of peaceful resolution of international conflicts. Bishop Wawrzyniec Goślicki (Goslicius), who wrote and published in 1568 a study entitled De optimo senatore (The Counsellor in the 1598 English translation), was another popular and influential in the West political thinker.

Historian Marcin Kromer wrote De origine et rebus gestis Polonorum (On the origin and deeds of Poles) in 1555 and in 1577 Polonia, a treatise highly regarded in Europe. Marcin Bielski's Chronicle of the Whole World, a universal history, was written ca. 1550. The chronicle of Maciej Stryjkowski (1582) covered the history of Eastern Europe.

=== Literature ===
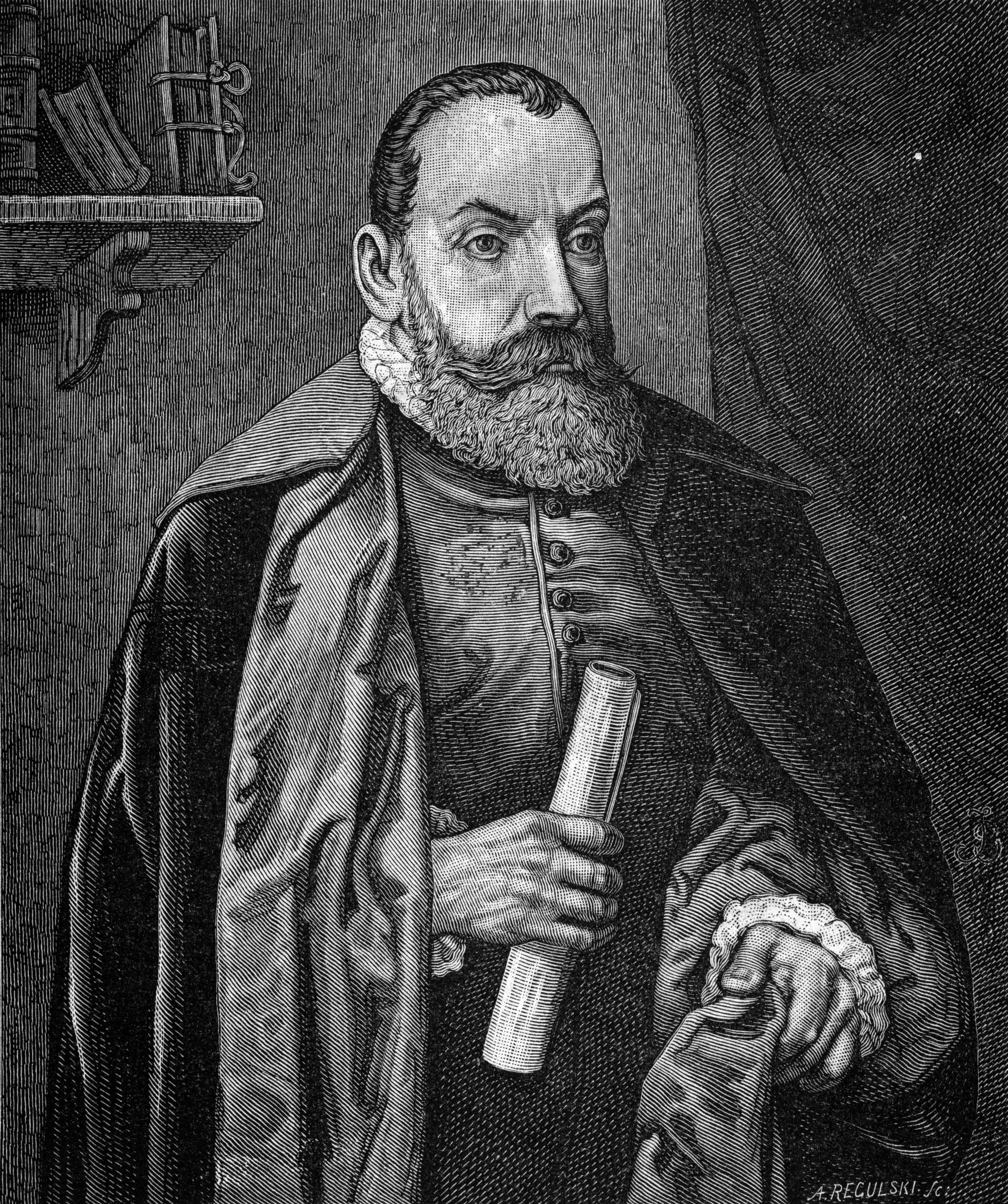
Jan Kochanowski, Polish Renaissance poet who established poetic patterns that would become integral to the Polish literary language

Modern Polish literature begins in the 16th century. At that time the Polish language, common to all educated groups, matured and penetrated all areas of public life, including municipal institutions, the legal code, the Church and other official uses, coexisting for a while with Latin. Klemens Janicki, one of the Renaissance Latin language poets, a laureate of a papal distinction, was of peasant origin. Another plebeian author, Biernat of Lublin, wrote his own version of Aesop's fables in Polish, permeated with his socially radical views.

A Literary Polish language breakthrough came under the influence of the Reformation with the writings of Mikołaj Rej. In his Brief Discourse, a satire published in 1543, he defends a serf from a priest and a noble, but in his later works he often celebrates the joys of the peaceful but privileged life of a country gentleman. Rej, whose legacy is his unbashful promotion of the Polish language, left a great variety of literary pieces. Łukasz Górnicki, an author and translator, perfected the Polish prose of the period. His contemporary and friend Jan Kochanowski became one of the greatest Polish poets of all time.

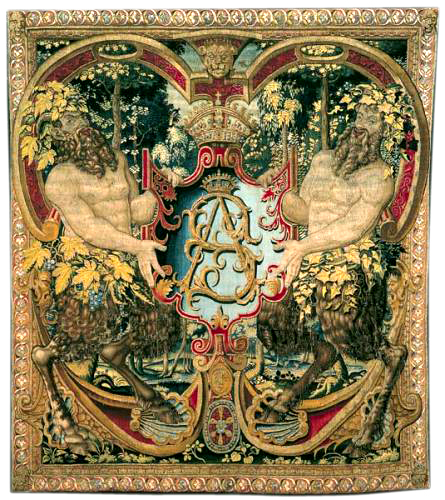
Tapestry with shield-bearing satyrs and monogram SA of king Sigismund Augustus, ca. 1555

Kochanowski was born in 1530 into a prosperous noble family. In his youth he studied at the universities of Kraków, Königsberg and Padua and traveled extensively in Europe. He worked for a time as a royal secretary, and then settled in the village of Czarnolas, a part of his family inheritance. Kochanowski's multifaceted creative output is remarkable for both the depth of thoughts and feelings that he shares with the reader, and for its beauty and classic perfection of form. Among Kochanowski's best known works are bucolic Frascas (trifles), epic poetry, religious lyrics, drama-tragedy The Dismissal of the Greek Envoys, and the most highly regarded Threnodies or laments, written after the death of his young daughter. The poet Mikołaj Sęp Szarzyński, an intellectually refined master of small forms, bridges the late Renaissance and early Baroque artistic periods.

=== Music ===
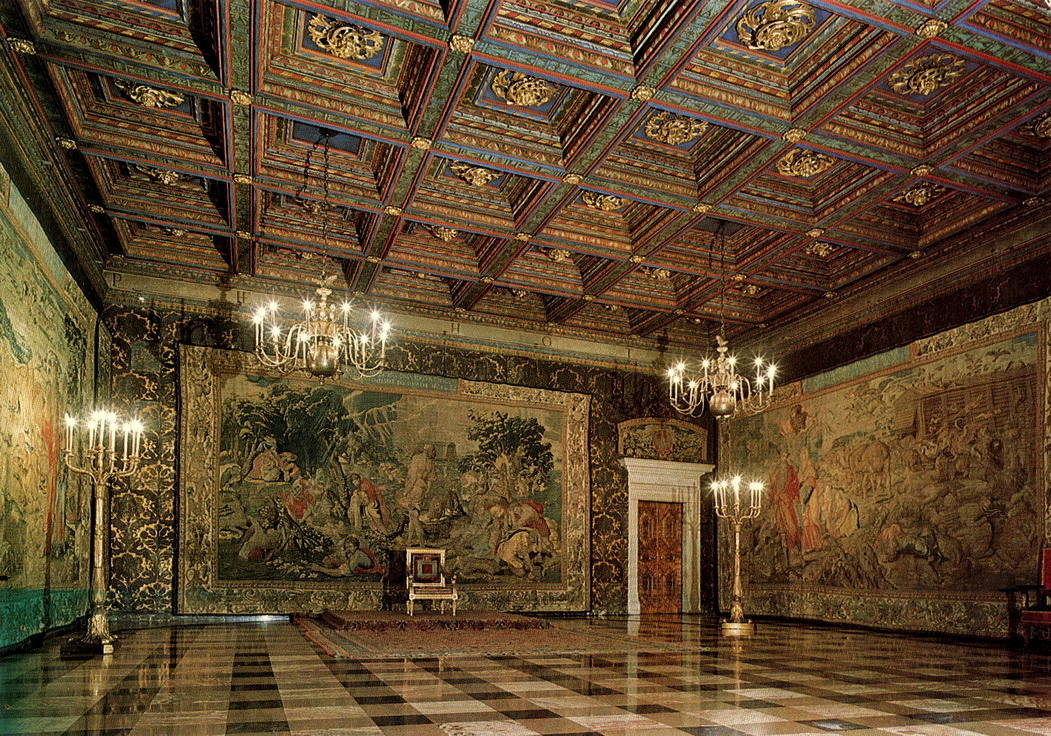
Wawel Castle

Following the European and Italian in particular musical trends, the Renaissance music was developing in Poland, centered around the royal court patronage and branching from there. Sigismund I kept from 1543 a permanent choir at Wawel Castle, while the Reformation brought large scale group Polish language church singing during the services. Jan of Lublin wrote a comprehensive tablature for the organ and other keyboard instruments. Among the composers, who often permeated their music with national and folk elements, were Wacław of Szamotuły, Mikołaj Gomółka, who wrote music to Kochanowski translated psalms, and Mikołaj Zieleński, who enriched the Polish music by adopting the Venetian School polyphonic style.

=== Architecture, sculpture and painting ===
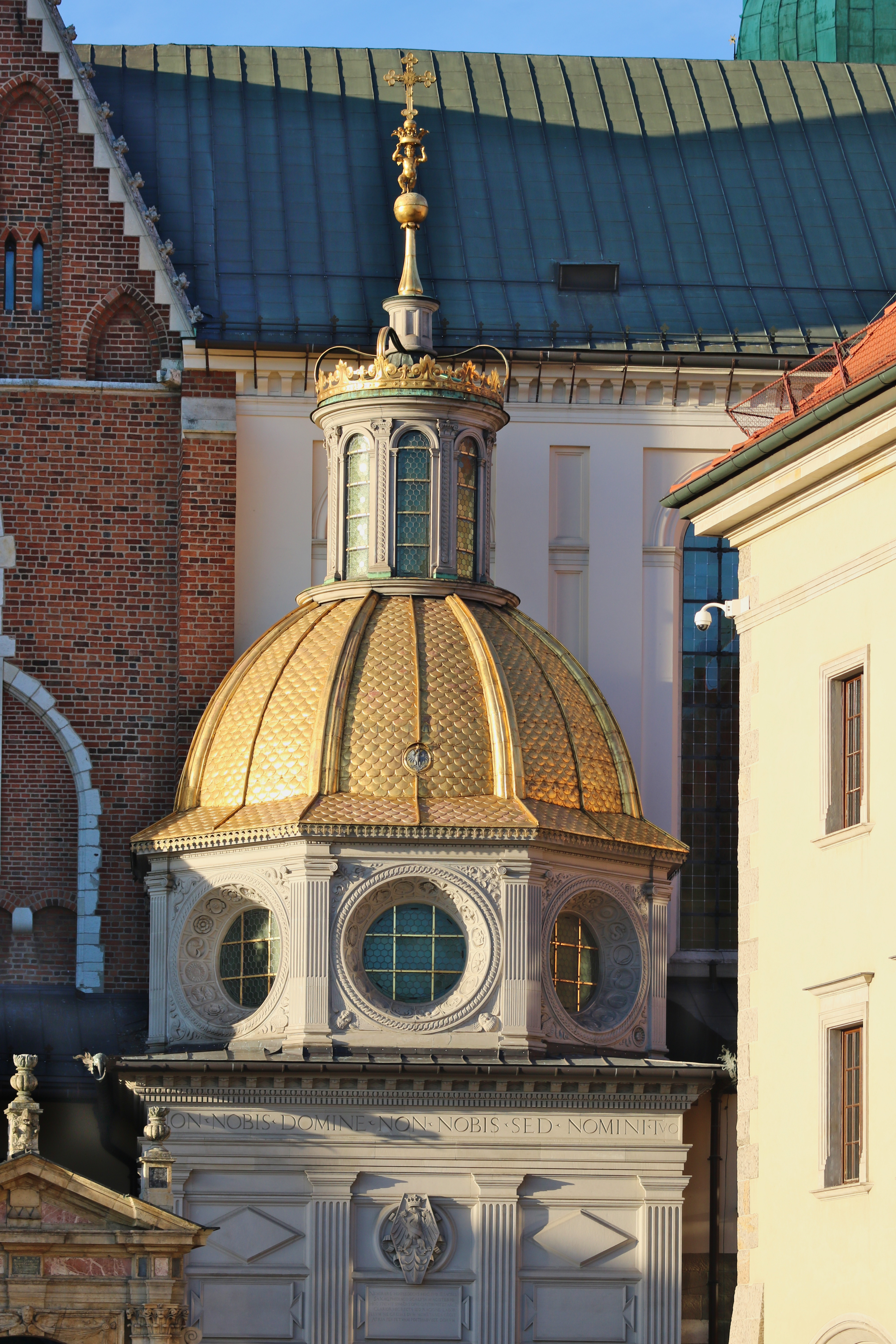
Sigismund's Chapel serves as a tomb for the last Jagiellonian monarchs. Designed by Italian masters, the dome was covered with real gold to illustrate Poland's prosperity during the Golden Age.

Architecture, sculpture and painting developed also under Italian influence from the beginning of the 16th century. A number of professionals from Tuscany arrived and worked as royal artists in Kraków. Francesco Fiorentino had started work on the tomb of John I Albert in 1502, and then together with Bartolommeo Berrecci and Benedykt from Sandomierz rebuilt the royal castle between 1507 and 1536. Berrecci also built Sigismund's Chapel at Wawel Cathedral. Polish magnates, Silesian Piast princes in Brzeg, and even Kraków merchants (by the mid 16th century their class had gained economic strength nationwide) built or rebuilt their residences to make them resemble the Wawel Castle. Kraków's Sukiennice and Poznań City Hall are among numerous buildings rebuilt in the Renaissance manner, but Gothic construction continued alongside for a number of decades.

Between 1580 and 1600 Jan Zamoyski commissioned the Venetian architect Bernardo Morando to build the city of Zamość. The town and its fortifications were designed to consistently implement the Renaissance and Mannerism aesthetic paradigms. Tombstone sculpture, often inside churches, is richly represented on graves of clergy and lay dignitaries and other wealthy individuals. Jan Maria Padovano and Jan Michałowicz of Urzędów count among the prominent artists.

The painted illuminations in the Balthasar Behem Codex are of exceptional quality, and draw their inspiration largely from Gothic art. Stanisław Samostrzelnik, a monk in the Cistercian monastery in Mogiła near Kraków, painted miniatures and polychromed wall frescos.

== Jagiellonian dynasty ==
At the end of the 15th century, the Jagiellonians reigned over vast territories stretching from the Baltic to the Black to the Adriatic Sea. The dynasty reigned in several Central European countries between the 14th and 16th centuries. Members of the dynasty were Kings of Poland (1386–1572), Grand Dukes of Lithuania (1377–1392 and 1440–1572), Kings of Hungary (1440–1444 and 1490–1526), and Kings of Bohemia (1471–1526).

In 1515, during a congress in Vienna, a dynastic succession arrangement was agreed to between Maximilian I, Holy Roman Emperor and the Jagiellon brothers, Vladislas II of Bohemia and Hungary and Sigismund I of Poland and Lithuania. It was supposed to end the Emperor's support for Poland's enemies, the Teutonic and Russian states, but after the election of Charles V, Maximilian's successor in 1519, the relations with Sigismund had worsened.

The Jagiellon rivalry with the House of Habsburg in central Europe was ultimately resolved to the Habsburgs' advantage. The decisive factor that damaged or weakened the monarchies of the last Jagiellons was the Ottoman Empire's Turkish expansion. Hungary's vulnerability greatly increased after Suleiman the Magnificent took the Belgrade fortress in 1521. To prevent Poland from extending military aid to Hungary, Suleiman had a Tatar-Turkish force raid southeastern Poland–Lithuania in 1524. The Hungarian army was defeated in 1526 at the Battle of Mohács, where the young Louis II Jagiellon, son of Vladislas II, was killed. Subsequently, after a period of internal strife and external intervention, Hungary was partitioned between the Habsburgs and the Ottomans.

== Polish–Lithuanian Commonwealth ==
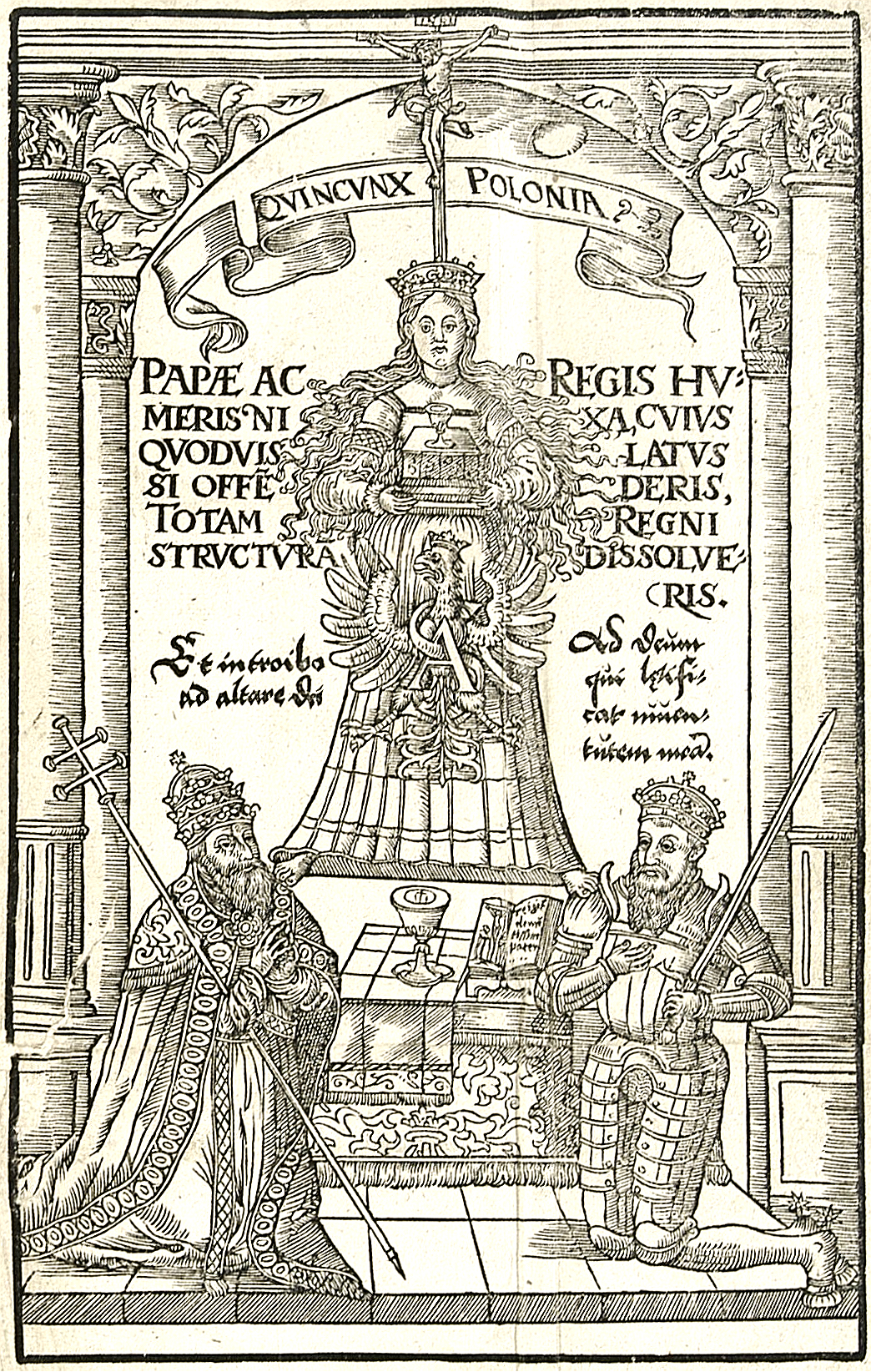
Conception of the Polish Crown of Stanisław Orzechowski, a szlachta ideologist. In 1564 Orzechowski wrote Quincunx, in which he expounded principles of a state identified with its nobility.

With the Union of Lublin, a unified Polish–Lithuanian Commonwealth (Rzeczpospolita) was created in 1569, stretching from the Baltic Sea and the Carpathian mountains to present-day Belarus and western and central Ukraine (which earlier had been Kievan Rus' principalities). Within the new federation some degree of formal separation of Poland and Lithuania was retained (distinct state offices, armies, treasuries and judicial systems), but the union became a multinational entity with a common monarch, parliament, monetary system and foreign-military policy, in which only the nobility enjoyed full citizenship rights. Moreover, the nobility's uppermost stratum was about to assume the dominant role in the Commonwealth, as magnate factions were acquiring the ability to manipulate and control the rest of szlachta to their clique's private advantage. This trend, facilitated further by the liberal settlement and land acquisition consequences of the union, became apparent around the time of the 1572 death of Sigismund Augustus, the last monarch of the Jagiellonian dynasty.

One of the most salient characteristics of the newly established Commonwealth was its multiethnicity, and accordingly diversity of religious faiths and denominations. Among the peoples represented were Poles (about 50% or less of the total population), Lithuanians, Latvians, Ruthenians (corresponding to today's Belarusians and Ukrainians), Germans, Estonians, Jews, Armenians, Tatars and Czechs, among others, for example smaller West European groups. As for the main social segments in the early 17th century, nearly 70% of the Commonwealth's population were peasants, over 20% residents of towns, and less than 10% nobles and clergy combined. The total population, estimated at 8–10 million, kept growing dynamically until the middle of the century. The Slavic populations of the eastern lands, Rus' or Ruthenia, were solidly, except for the Polish colonizing nobility (and Polonized elements of local nobility), Eastern Orthodox, which portended future trouble for the Commonwealth.

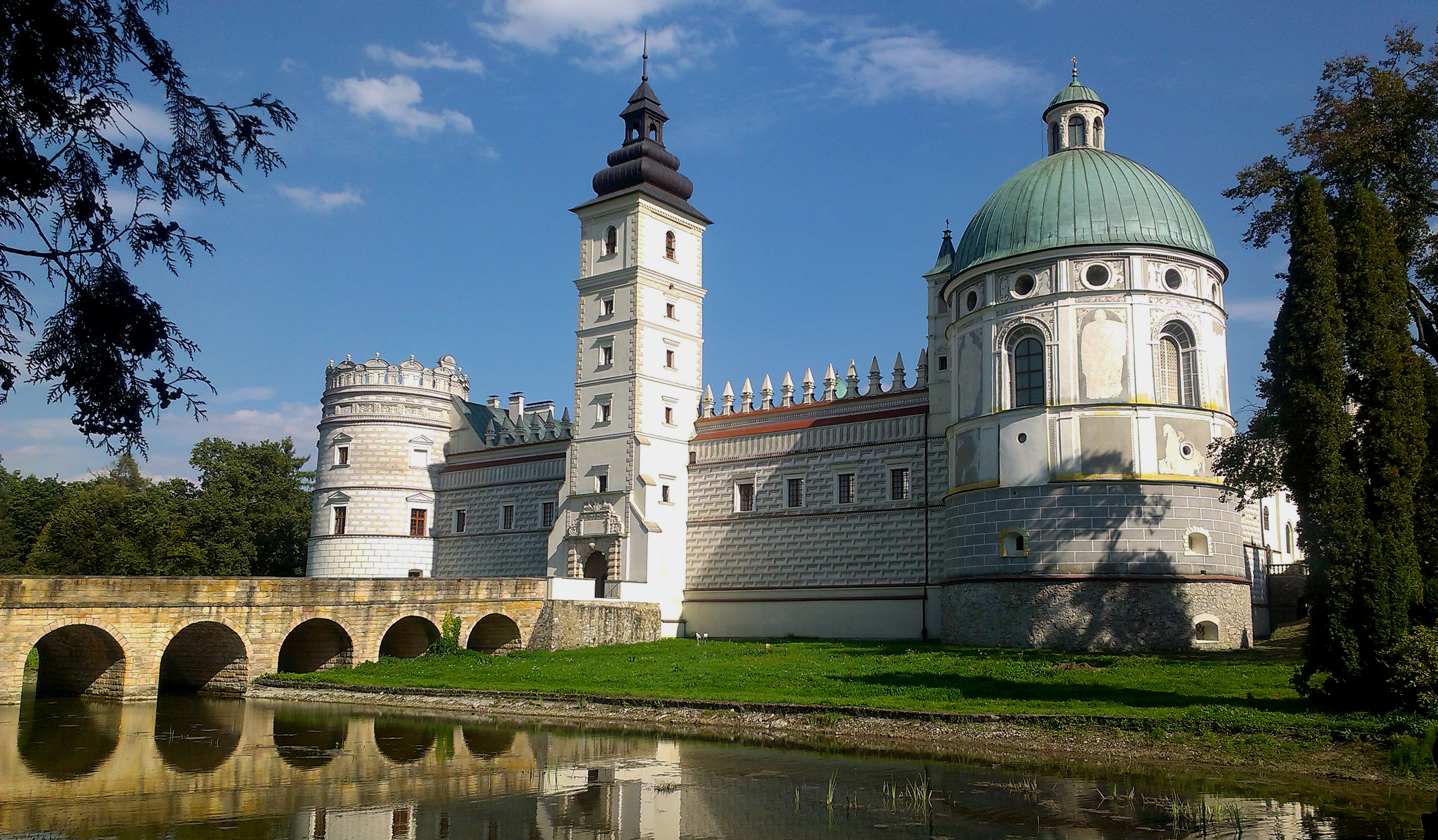
Castle in Krasiczyn

The political doctrine of the Commonwealth was: our state is a republic under the presidency of the King. Chancellor Jan Zamoyski summed up this doctrine when he said that Rex regnat et non-gubernat ("The King reigns but [lit. 'and'] does not govern"). The Commonwealth had a parliament, the Sejm, as well as a Senat and an elected king (Pic. 1). The king was obliged to respect citizens' rights specified in King Henry's Articles as well as in Pacta conventa, negotiated at the time of his election.

The monarch's power was limited in favor of a sizable noble class. Each new king had to pledge to uphold the Henrician Articles, which were the basis of Poland's political system (and included near-unprecedented guarantees of religious tolerance). Over time, the Henrician Articles were merged with the Pacta Conventa, specific pledges agreed to by the king-elect. From that point onwards, the king was effectively a partner with the noble class and was constantly supervised by a group of senators. The Sejm could veto the king on important matters, including legislation (the adoption of new laws), foreign affairs, declaration of war, and taxation (changes of existing taxes or the levying of new ones).

Polish–Lithuanian Commonwealth at its maximum extent, after the Truce of Deulino in 1619, overlaid over modern borders.

The foundation of the Commonwealth's political system, the "Golden Liberty" (Polish: Złota Wolność, a term used from 1573 on), included:

- election of the king by all nobles wishing to participate, known as wolna elekcja (free election);
- Sejm, the Commonwealth parliament which the king was required to hold every two years;
- Pacta conventa (Latin), "agreed-to agreements" negotiated with the king-elect, including a bill of rights, binding on the king, derived from the earlier Henrician Articles.
- religious freedom guaranteed by Warsaw Confederation Act 1573
- rokosz (insurrection), the right of szlachta to form a legal rebellion against a king who violated their guaranteed freedoms;
- liberum veto (Latin), the right of an individual Sejm deputy to oppose a decision by the majority in a Sejm session; the voicing of such a "free veto" nullified all the legislation that had been passed at that session; during the crisis of the second half of the 17th century, Polish nobles could also use the liberum veto in provincial sejmiks;
- konfederacja (from the Latin confederatio), the right to form an organization to force through a common political aim.

== Livonian War; struggle for Baltic area domination ==
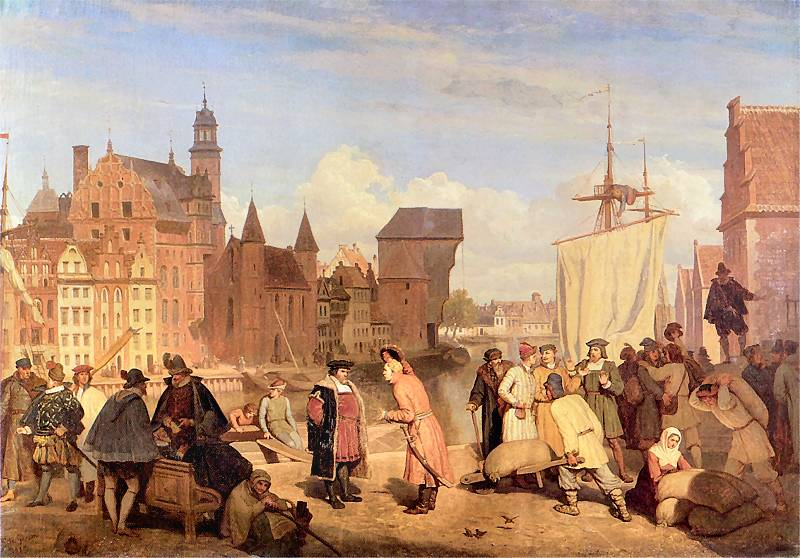
Gdańsk in the 17th century

In the 16th century the Grand Duchy of Lithuania became increasingly interested in extending its territorial rule to Livonia, especially to gain control of Baltic seaports, such as Riga, and for other economic benefits. Livonia was by the 1550s largely Lutheran, traditionally ruled by the Brothers of the Sword knightly order. This put Poland and Lithuania on a collision course with Moscow and other regional powers, which had also attempted expansion in that area.

Other powers aspiring to the Livonian Baltic access responded by partitioning the Livonian state, which triggered the lengthy Livonian War, fought between 1558 and 1583. Ivan IV of Russia took Dorpat (Tartu) and Narva in 1558, and soon the Danes and Swedes had occupied other parts of the country. To protect the integrity of their country, the Livonians sought a union with the Polish–Lithuanian state. Gotthard Kettler, the new Grand Master, met in Vilnius (Vilna, Wilno) with Sigismund Augustus in 1561 and declared Livonia a vassal state under the Polish King. The agreement of November 28 called for secularization of the Brothers of the Sword Order and incorporation of the newly established Duchy of Livonia into the Rzeczpospolita ("Republic") as an autonomous entity. The Union of Vilnius also created the Duchy of Courland and Semigallia as a separate fief, to be ruled by Kettler. Sigismund II obliged himself to recover the parts of Livonia lost to Moscow and the Baltic powers. These conflicts led to grueling wars with Russia (1558–1570 and 1577–1582) and other struggles over control of Baltic trade and freedom of navigation.

The Baltic region policies of the last Jagiellon king and his advisors were the most mature of the 16th century Poland's strategic programs. The outcome of the efforts in that area was to a considerable extent successful for the Commonwealth. The Livonian wars came to a conclusion under the reign of King Stephen Báthory.

In 1576, Stephen Báthory became the king of Poland as well as the grand duke of Lithuania. He turned the tide of the war with his successes between 1578 and 1581, including the joint Swedish–Polish–Lithuanian offensive at the Battle of Wenden. This was followed by an extended campaign through Russia culminating in the long and difficult siege of Pskov. Under the 1582 Truce of Jam Zapolski, which ended the war between Russia and Poland–Lithuania, Russia lost all its former holdings in Livonia and Polotsk to Poland–Lithuania. The following year, Sweden and Russia signed the Truce of Plussa with Sweden gaining most of Ingria and northern Livonia while retaining the Duchy of Estonia.

== House of Vasa ==
John III of Sweden married Catherine Jagellonka, the sister of Sigismund II Augustus of Poland. When Sigismund II of Poland died without issue, the son of John III of Sweden and Catherine Jagellonka was elected King of Poland and Grand Duke of Lithuania as Sigismund III in 1587. On John's death, Sigismund also gained the Swedish throne.

=== Polish–Swedish union ===
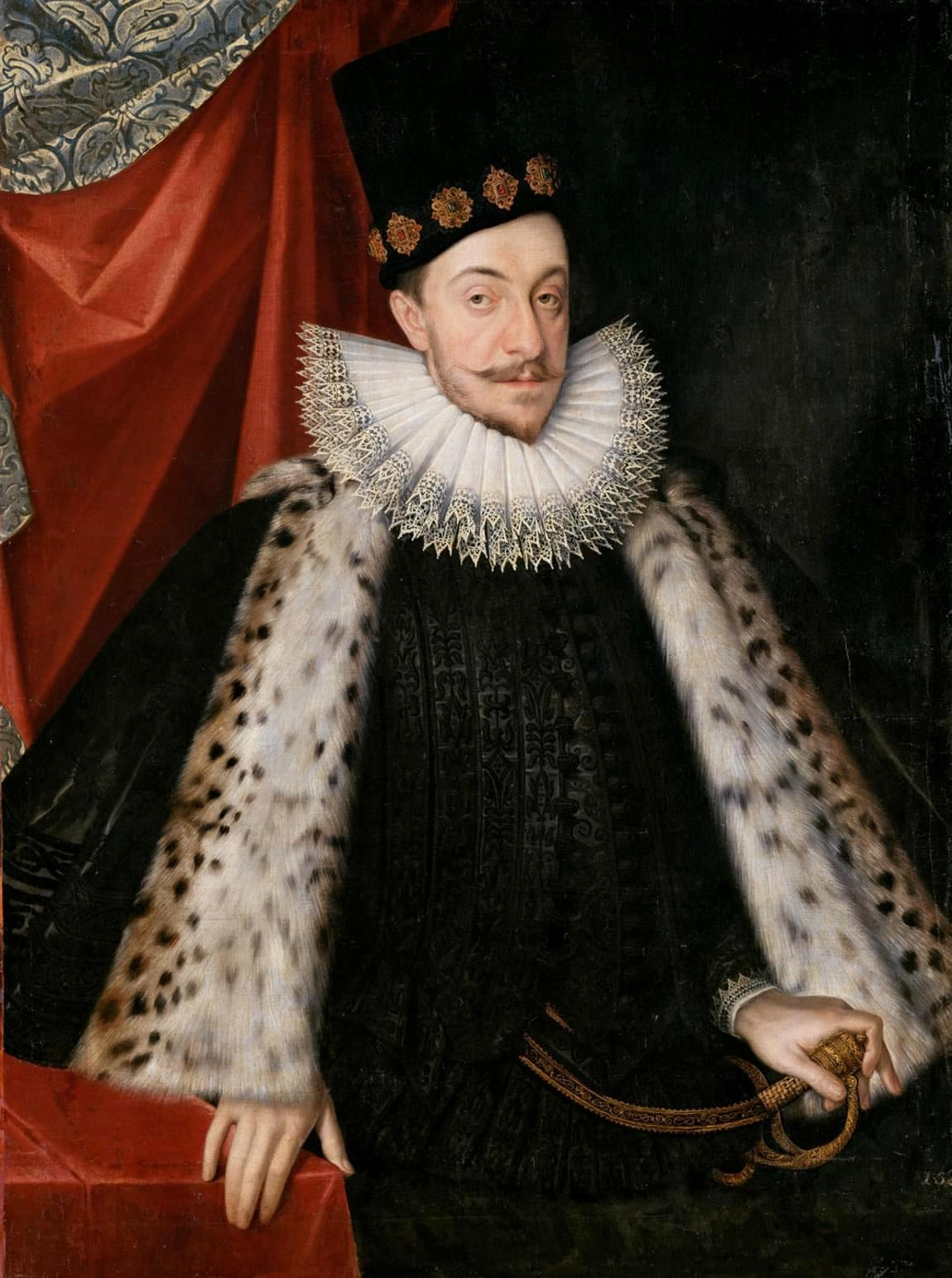
Sigismund III Vasa (1566-1632) was one of the most controversial Polish monarchs. Fervently Catholic and aiming to seize absolute power in the region, under his rule Poland was at its largest territorial extent

After the death of John III of Sweden, his son Sigismund became heir to the throne of Sweden. Sigismund at that time was already King of Poland (since 1587). Sigismund certainly valued the Swedish throne and upon learning about the death of his father, and the pretensions to the throne of his uncle, Duke Charles of Södermanland, he asked the Sejm (Polish parliament) for permission to leave the Commonwealth and go to Sweden, where he could temporarily secure the Swedish crown. The Sejm gave him permission, and on 3 August 1593, Sigismund, accompanied by his wife, Anna of Habsburg, and other followers, departed for Sweden.

The agreement of 19 February seemed to have calmed the situation; Sigismund was crowned in the Cathedral of Uppsala and became the king of Sweden. The Kingdom of Sweden was now in a personal union with Poland-Lithuania. In July, Sigismund left Sweden in the hands of the regency council and returned to Poland. Sweden was to be ruled jointly by the Privy Council of Sweden and Sigismund's uncle Duke Charles.

Sigismund, however, reneged on his earlier promises, opening Catholic schools, and giving Catholics prominent posts. Charles in turn did not give up on acquiring the Swedish throne and pursued his own political agenda. The new Riksdag he summoned at Arboga in 1597 – again despite the King's orders – saw few participants, and only one from the Privy Council. Even so, Duke Charles did not achieve support for his military action, but initiated it nonetheless. Parts of southern Sweden were successfully taken. Several of the Privy Council members fled to Poland to convince Sigismund to take counteractions. Sigismund sent a diplomatic mission, in an attempt to solve the conflict by negotiations. Charles at first looked ready to negotiate but in fact he was playing for time, trying to confirm his power at another Riksdag (in Arboga), recruiting peasants for his army, and isolating Sigismund's followers.

In 1598, the Sejm gave Sigismund the go-ahead to wage a military campaign against his opponents in Sweden; however, it refused to give him significant support. Sigismund's army was composed mostly of mercenaries (Germans and Hungarians), supported by a relatively small Polish force (although with some artillery).

Sigismund's campaign was poorly planned. He was unable to coordinate his troop movements with his supporters, particularly Fleming who was supposed to attack Charles from Finland. After initial successes (the taking of Kalmar and defeating Charles' troops at Stegeborg), Sigismund's forces were defeated on September 25, 1598, at the Battle of Stångebro, (also known as the battle of Linköping). Sigismund was captured and forced to hand over some of his followers such as the Chancellor of Sweden, Erik Larsson Sparre, (1550–1600). In May 1599, Charles' forces captured the last fortress held by Sigismund, Kalmar. On July 24, 1599, the Riksdag in Stockholm officially dethroned Sigismund. The new King of Sweden was Charles IX of Sweden, and the Polish–Swedish union was dissolved after barely seven years of existence. In March 1600, some of Sigismund's supporters were executed, including five senators in an event known as the Linköping Bloodbath.

== Polish invasion of Russia ==
=== Polish–Russian War (1609–1618) ===
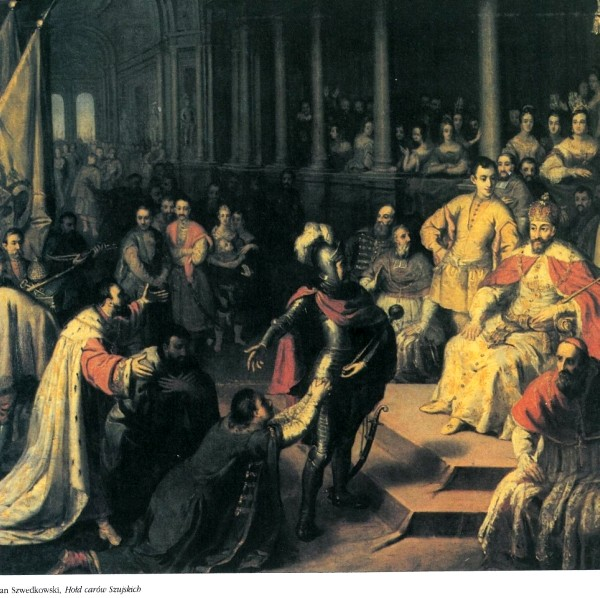
Shuysky Tribute, homage of the deposed tsar of Russia, Vasili IV Shuysky, to Sigismund III of Poland

The Dimitriads and the Polish–Russian War of 1609–1618 was a sequence of military conflicts and eastward invasions carried out by the Polish–Lithuanian Commonwealth and private armies and mercenaries led by the Commonwealth aristocracy, when the Tsardom of Russia was torn by a series of civil wars, a period referred to as the Time of Troubles. The sides and their goals changed several times during this conflict: the Polish–Lithuanian Commonwealth was not formally at war with Russia until 1609, and various Russian factions fought amongst themselves, allied with the Commonwealth and other countries or fighting against them. Sweden also participated in the conflict during the course of the Ingrian War (1610–1617), sometimes allying itself with Russia, and other times fighting against it. The aims of the various factions changed frequently as well as the scale of their goals, which ranged from minor border adjustments to imposing the Polish Kings or the Polish-backed impostors' claims to the Russian throne and even the creation of a new state by forming a union between the commonwealth and Russia.

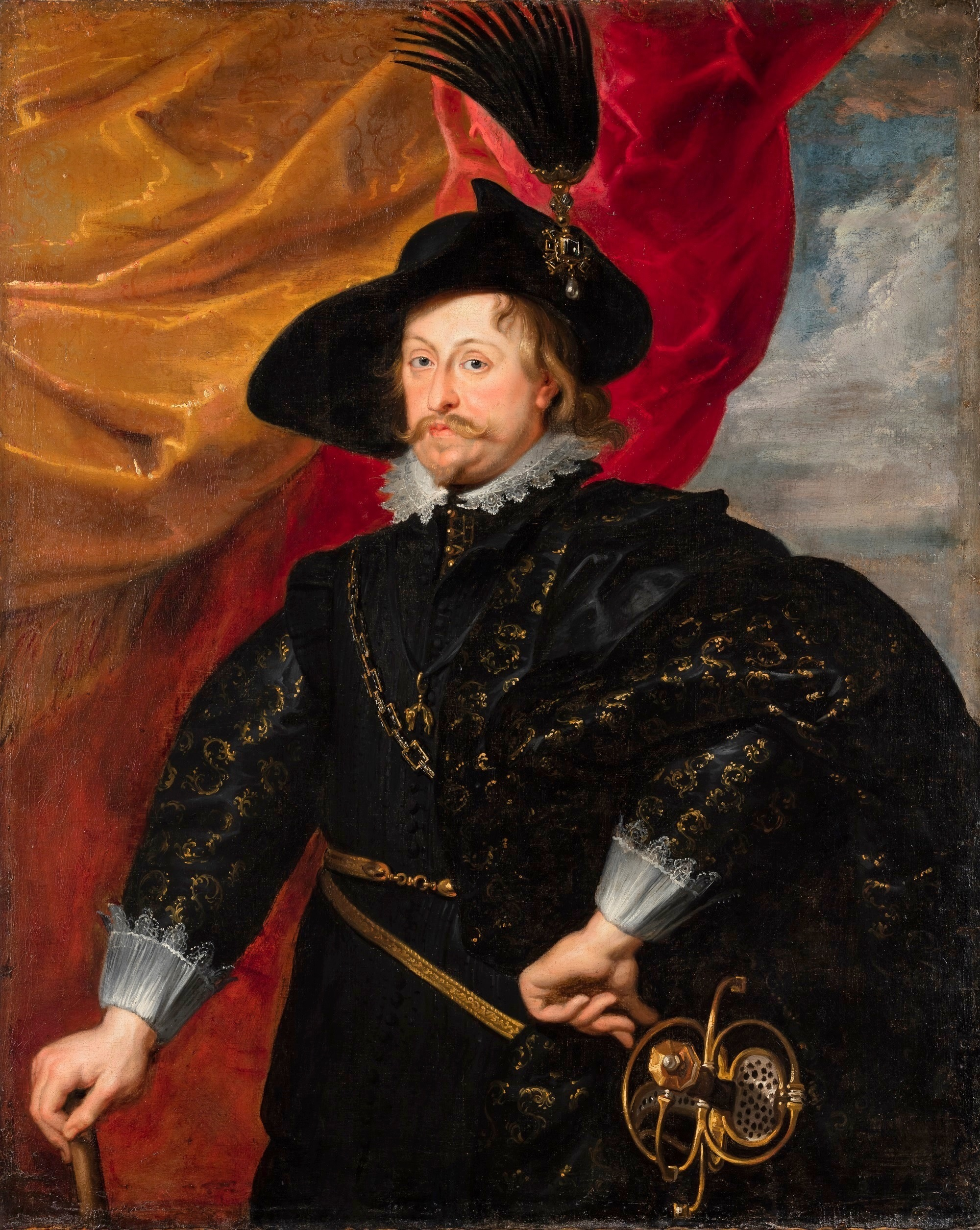
Władysław IV Vasa of Poland (1595-1648), portrait by Peter Paul Rubens. When the Polish army occupied Moscow in 1610, he was elected as the tsar of Russia but did not assume the throne

The war can be divided into four stages. In the first stage, certain Commonwealth szlachta (nobility), encouraged by some Russian boyars (nobles), but without the official consent of the Polish king Sigismund III Vasa, attempted to exploit Russia's weakness and intervene in its civil war by supporting the impostors for the tsardom, False Dmitriy I and later False Dmitriy II, against the crowned tsars, Boris Godunov and Vasili Shuiski. The first wave of the Polish intervention began in 1605 and ended in 1606 with the death of False Dmitry I. The second wave started in 1607 and lasted until 1609, when Tsar Vasili made a military alliance with Sweden. In response to this alliance, the Polish king Sigismund III decided to intervene officially and to declare war upon Russia, aiming to weaken Sweden's ally and to gain territorial concessions.

Hetman Stanisław Żółkiewski made a triumphal entry into Kraków near the Royal Palace, leading his prisoners: the Russian tsar Vasili IV Shuysky; Dmitry Shuysky and his wife, Yekaterina Grigoryevna, daughter of Grigory Malyuta Skuratov; Ivan Shuysky; Mikhail Shein; and Filaret, the non-canonical patriarch of Moscow and all Russia.

After early Commonwealth victories, such as in the Battle of Klushino, which culminated in Polish forces entering Moscow in 1610, Sigismund's son, Prince Władysław of Poland, was briefly elected tsar. However, soon afterwards, Sigismund decided to seize the Russian throne for himself. This alienated the pro-Polish supporters among the boyars, who could accept the moderate Władysław, but not the pro-Catholic and anti-Eastern Orthodox Sigismund. Subsequently, the pro-Polish Russian faction disappeared, and the war resumed in 1611, with the Poles being ousted from Moscow in 1612 but capturing the important city of Smolensk. However, due to internal troubles in both the Commonwealth and Russia, little military action occurred between 1612 and 1617, when Sigismund made one final and failed attempt to conquer Russia. The war finally ended in 1618 with the Truce of Deulino, which granted the Commonwealth certain territorial concessions, but not control over Russia, which thus emerged from the war with its independence unscathed.
