= Vasili IV of Russia =

Tsar of Russia from 1606 to 1610

Vasili IV
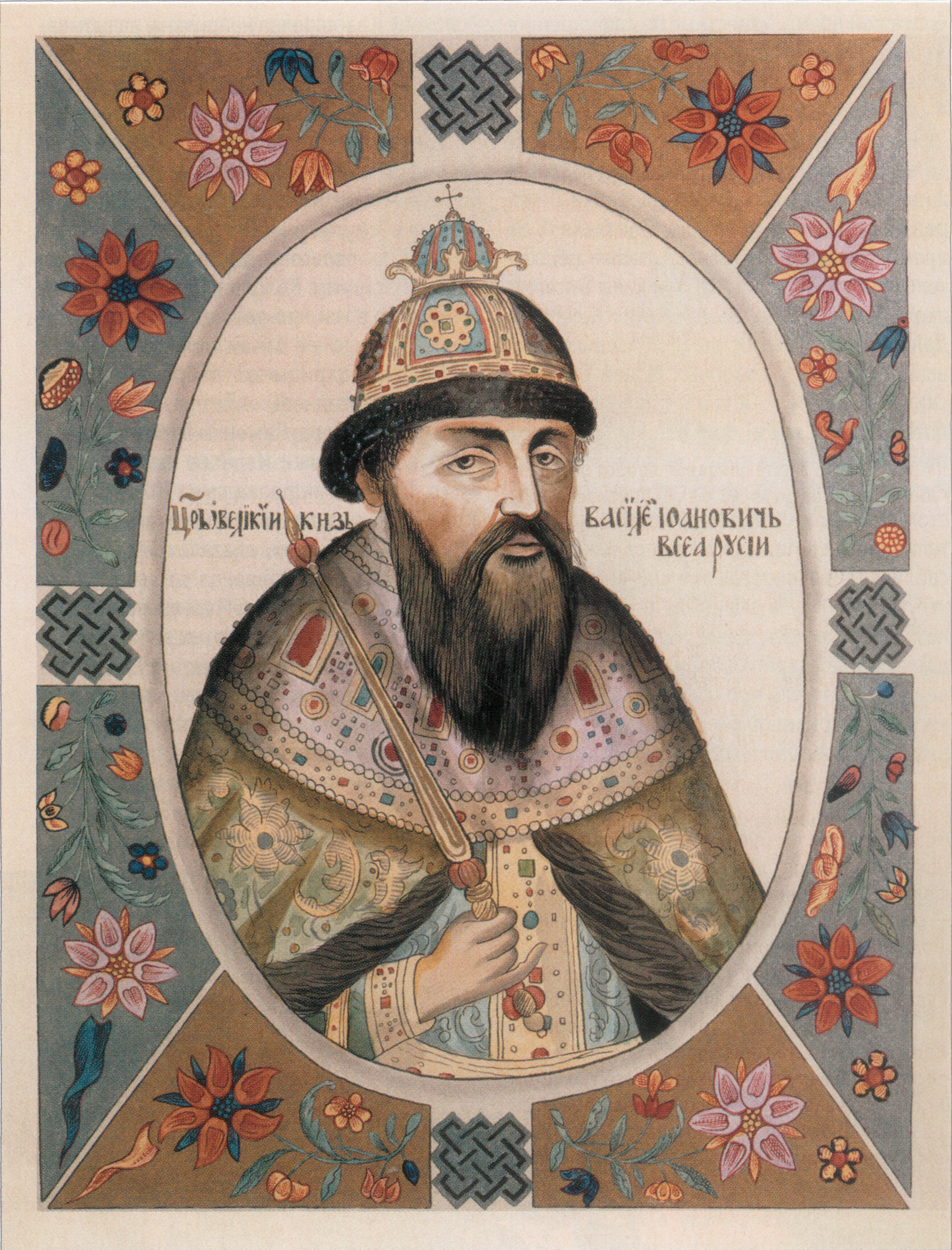
- 1887 copy of a 1672 miniature of Vasili IV

Tsar of all Russia
- Reign: 29 May [O.S. 19 May] 1606 – 29 July [O.S. 19 July] 1610
- Predecessor: False Dmitry I
- Successor: Vladislav (de jure, disputed); Fedor Mstislavsky (as the head of the Seven Boyars)
- Born: c. 1552; Russia
- Died: 12 September 1612 (aged 59); Gostynin, Polish–Lithuanian Commonwealth (imprisoned)
- Spouse: Elena Mikhailovna Repnina; Ekaterina (Maria) Buynosova-Rostovskaia
Names
- Vasily Ivanovich Shuyskiy
- House: Shuysky
- Father: Ivan Andreyevich Shuysky
- Mother: Marfa Feodorovna
- Religion: Russian Orthodox

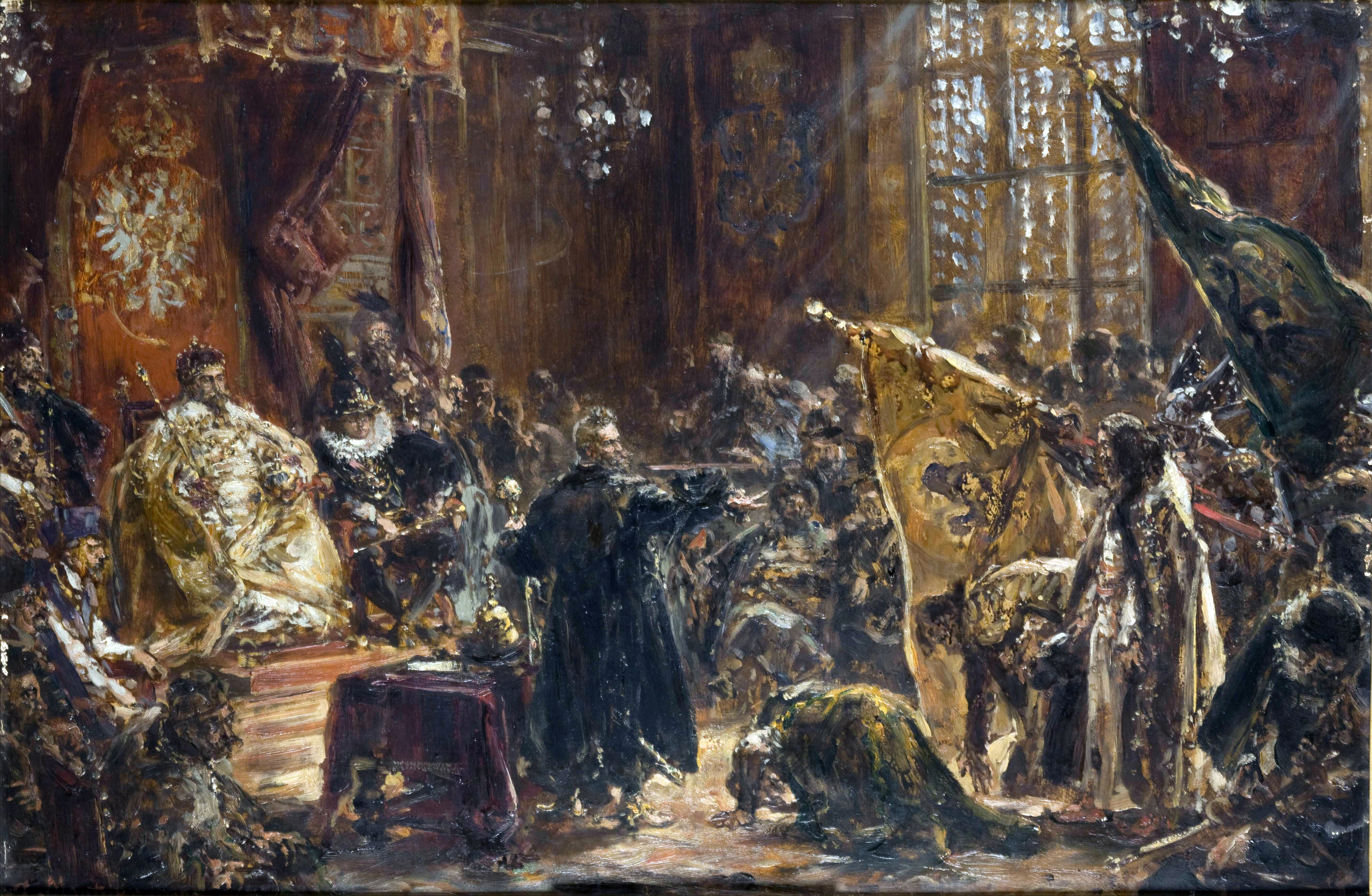
Vasili Shuisky at the Warsaw Sejm

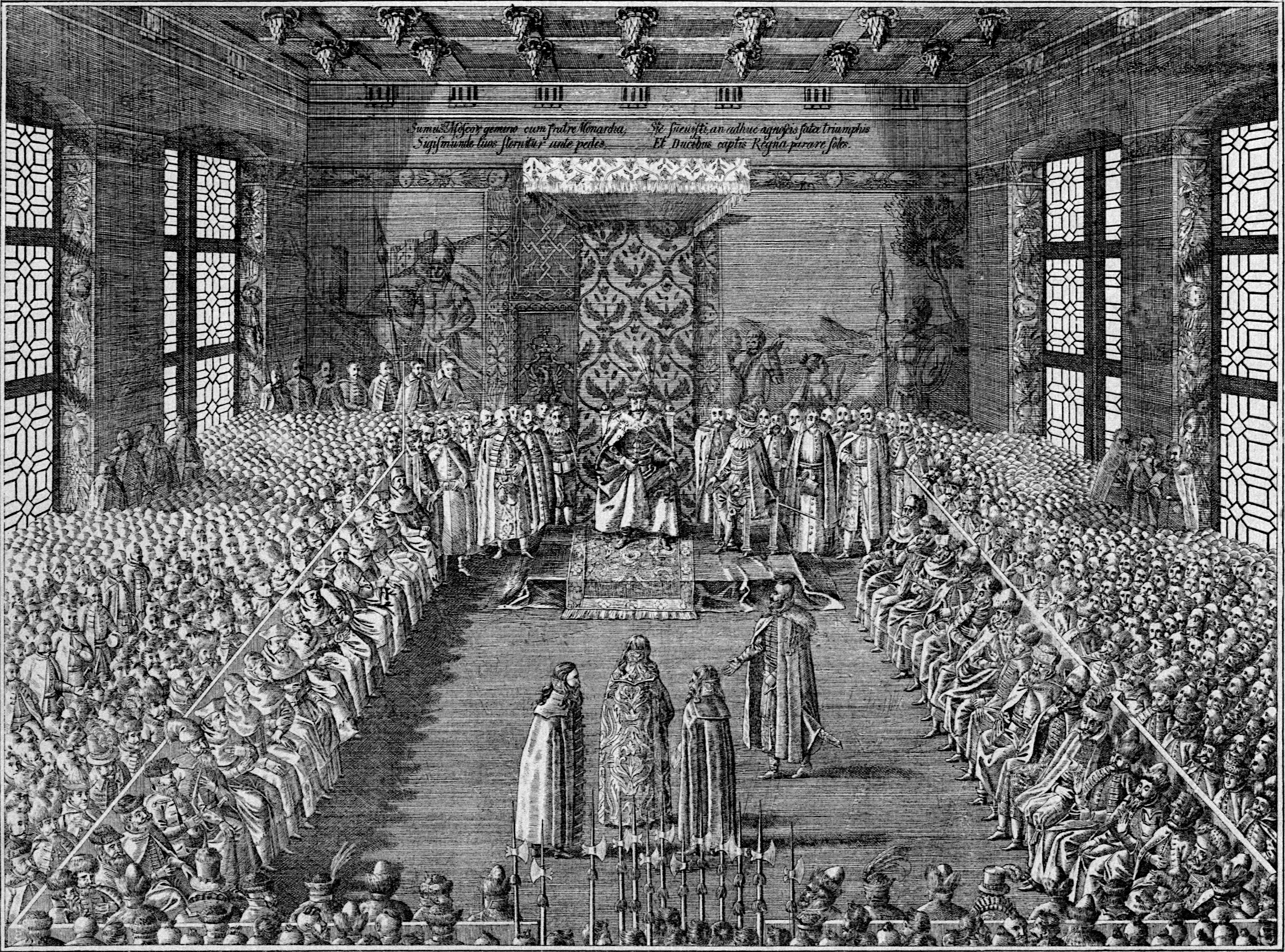
Vasili Shuisky with his brothers at the Warsaw Sejm on 29 October 1611 engraved by Tomasz Makowski after lost picture of Tommaso Dolabella

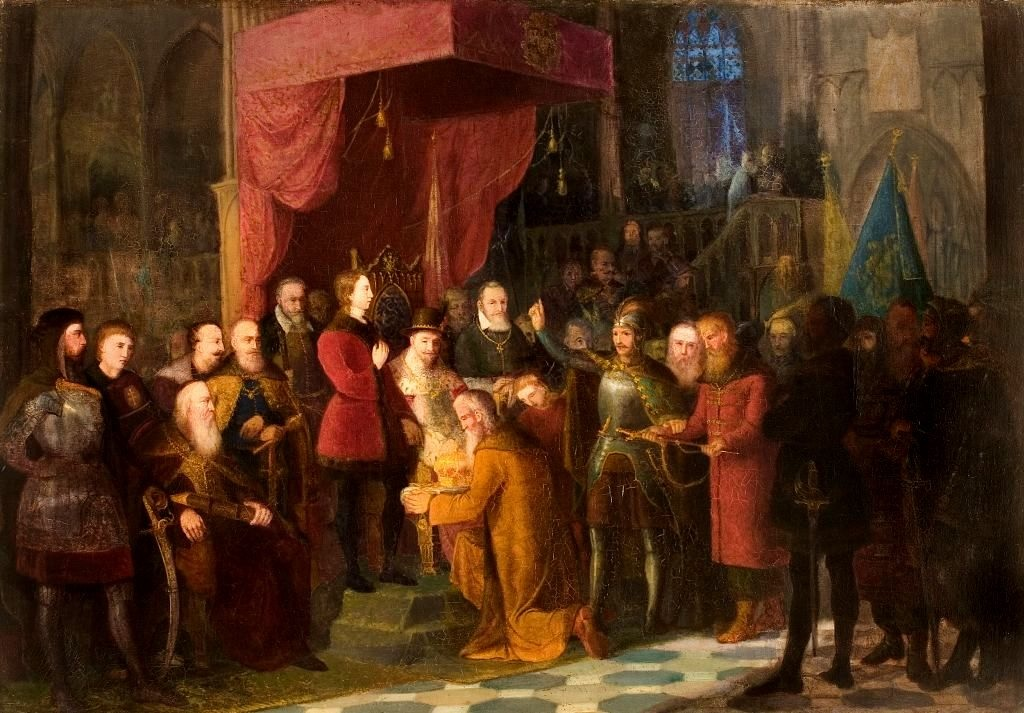
Vasili IV paying homage to Sigismund III of Poland in Warsaw, by Jan Matejko

Vasili IV Ivanovich Shuisky (Russian: Василий IV Иванович Шуйский, romanized: Vasiliy IV Ivanovich Shuyskiy, c. 1552 – 12 September 1612) was Tsar of all Russia from 1606 to 1610, after the murder of False Dmitri I. His rule coincided with the Time of Troubles. He was the only member of House of Shuisky to become tsar and the last member of the Rurikid dynasty (Yurievichi branch) to rule as tsar.

== Life ==
He was a son of Ivan Andreyevich Shuisky. Born Prince Vasili Ivanovich Shuisky, he descended from the Yurievichi sovereign princes of Nizhny Novgorod, and was allegedly a 20th-generation male-line descendant of the 9th-century Varangian prince Rurik. Vasili Ivanovich was one of the leading boyars of the Tsardom of Russia during the reigns of Feodor I (r. 1584–1598) and Boris Godunov (r. 1598–1605). In the court intrigues of the Time of Troubles (1598–1613), Vasily and his younger brother Dmitry Shuisky usually acted together and fought as one.

It was Shuisky who, in obedience to the secret orders of tsar-to-be Boris, went to Uglich to inquire into the cause of the death of the Tsarevich Dmitry Ivanovich (the youngest son of Ivan the Terrible (r. 1533–1584)), who had perished there in mysterious circumstances in May 1591. Shuisky reported that it was a case of suicide, though rumors abounded that the Tsarevich had been assassinated on the orders of the regent Boris Godunov. Some suspected that Dmitry escaped the assassination and that another boy was killed in his place – this story provided impetus for the repeated emergence of impostors such as False Dmitry I, False Dmitry II, and False Dmitry III. On the death of Boris, who had become tsar, and the accession of Boris's son Feodor II in 1605, Shuisky went back upon his own words in order to gain favour with the pretender False Dmitriy I, who was attempting to gain the throne by impersonating the dead Tsarevich Dmitry Ivanovich. Shuisky recognized the pretender as the "real" Dmitry, despite having earlier determined that the boy had committed suicide. Soon afterwards the young Tsar Feodor fell victim to an assassination.

Shuisky then turned against the false Dmitry and brought about his death (in May 1606) by stating that the real Dmitry had indeed been slain and that the reigning tsar Dmitriy (False Dmitriy I) was an impostor. After Dmitriy's death, Shuisky's adherents proclaimed him tsar, on 19 May 1606. He reigned until 19 July 1610, but was never generally recognized. Even in Moscow itself he had little or no authority, and he only avoided deposition by the dominant boyars because they had no one to replace him with.

The popularity of Vasili Shuisky's cousin, Prince Mikhail Skopin-Shuisky, who commanded an army aided by an allied Swedish force led by Jacob de la Gardie, allowed Shuisky, for a time, to remain on his unstable throne. In 1610 the Seven Boyars, notably his former adherents Princes Ivan Mikhailovich Vorotynsky and Fedor Ivanovich Mstislavsky, deposed him. He was forcibly made a monk and eventually transported together with his two brothers to Warsaw by the Polish hetman Stanisław Żółkiewski. He died a prisoner in the castle of Gostynin, near Warsaw, in 1612, followed soon after by his brother Dmitry. The Romanovs, elected as rulers of Russia in 1613, recognized Vasili posthumously as a legal tsar, and during their negotiations with the Polish authorities constantly demanded the right to rebury his body in Russia. Following the Treaty of Polyanovka in 1635, Vasili's remains were finally returned to Moscow and laid to rest in the Archangel Cathedral.

== Marriages and issue ==
Vasili Shuisky was married twice. His first wife, Elena Mikhailovna Repnina, died prior his election to tsardom, and he had no children from that marriage. After his coronation, Vasili married Princess Ekaterina Buynosova-Rostovskaya, whose name was changed to Maria, deemed more suitable for a tsarina consort. They had two daughters together, princesses Anna and Anastasia, but both died in infancy during their father's reign, and were buried in the Old Maiden's Convent in Kremlin. As both brothers of Vasili, princes Dmitri Shuisky and Ivan Shuisky the Button, died also childless, the Shuiskys' princely house became extinct after the death of the latter in 1638.

== In literature ==
The future Tsar Vasili IV serves as a character in Alexander Pushkin's blank verse drama Boris Godunov and Modest Mussorgsky's opera of the same name. In both depictions, the character is an adviser to Boris Godunov and a master of palace intrigue. Despite being fully aware that Tsar Boris ordered the assassination of the child Tsarevich Dmitriy, Vasili Shuisky remains outwardly loyal, only switching his support to the Pretender when the latter appears likely to win. Pushkin later described his intention to write further plays about the Time of Troubles.

About Vasili Shuisky, Pushkin wrote,

I intend to return to Shuisky also. In the historical account he shows a singular mixture of audacity, flexibility, and strength of character. Lackey of Godunov, he is one of the first boyars to go over to Dmitri's side. He is the first one who conspires, and note this, he is the one who risks himself; he is the one who vociferates, who accuses, who after being chief becomes a soldier in the front ranks. He is about to lose his head, Dmitri pardons him when he's already on the scaffold, he exiles him, and with the thoughtless generousity of this amiable adventurer, he recalls him to court, and covers him with gifts and honors. What does Shuisky do—he who has come so close to the hatchet and the block? He has nothing more important to do than conspire anew, to succeed, to have himself elected Tsar, to fall and during his fall to preserve more dignity and strength of spirit than he had ever had in his entire life.

== See also ==
- Bibliography of Russian history (1223–1613)
- Tsars of Russia family tree
- Shuysky Tribute

Vasili IV of Russia Shuysky Dynasty Cadet branch of the Yurievichi Born: 1552 Died: 12 September 1612
Regnal titles
| Preceded by Dmitriy II | Tsar of Russia; 1606–1610 | Succeeded by Vladislav I |
