= Shuysky Tribute =

1611 oath of allegiance by Mickail Shuisky of Russia to the Polish King Sigismund III

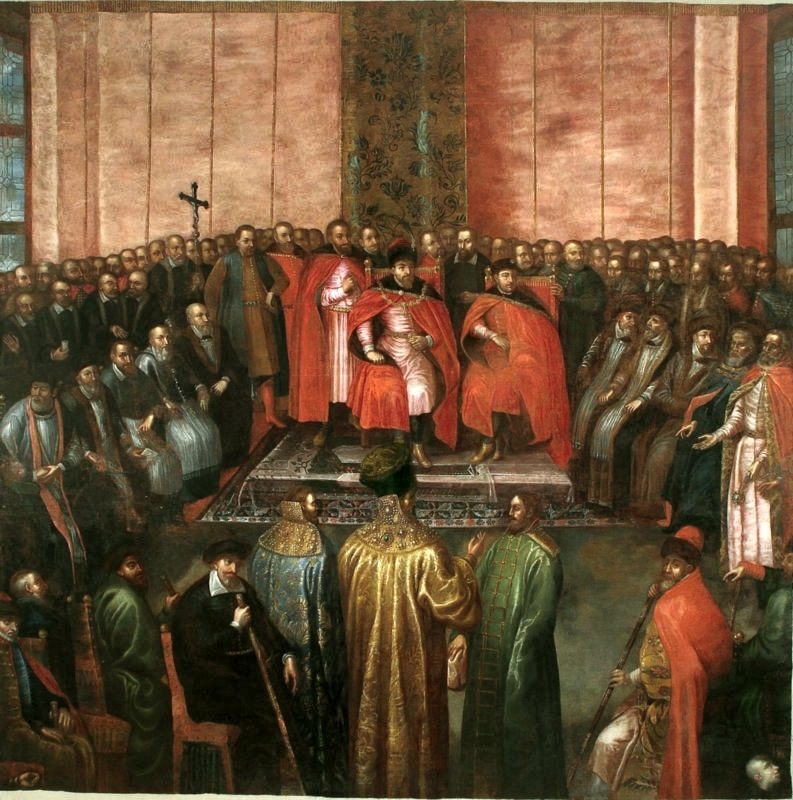
In 1611 at the parliament, Stanisław Żółkiewski shows King Zygmunt III and Prince Władysław, the imprisoned Czar Shuisky, as depicted by Tommaso Dolabella, from the collection in the Pidhirtsi Castle.

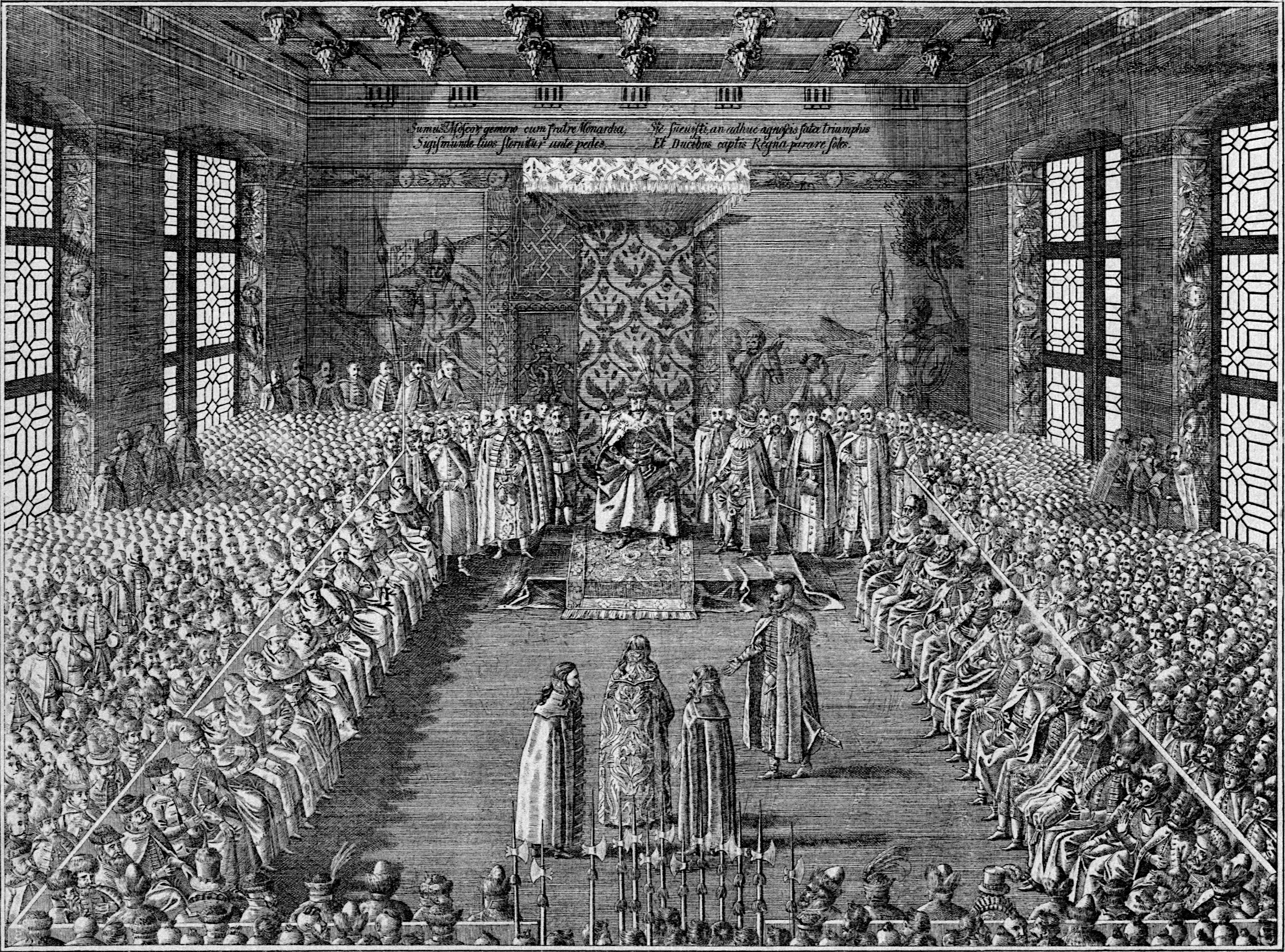
Stanislaw Żółkiewski shows King Zygmunt III and prince Władysław in 1611 at the parliament with the captured Shuisky Czars, by Tommaso Dolabella, from the collection in the Pidhirtsi Castle

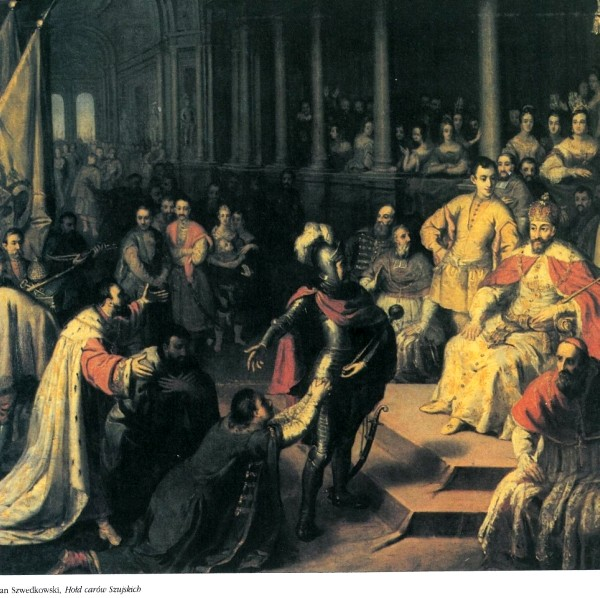
Tribute of Czars Shuysky, Jan Kanty Szwedkowski

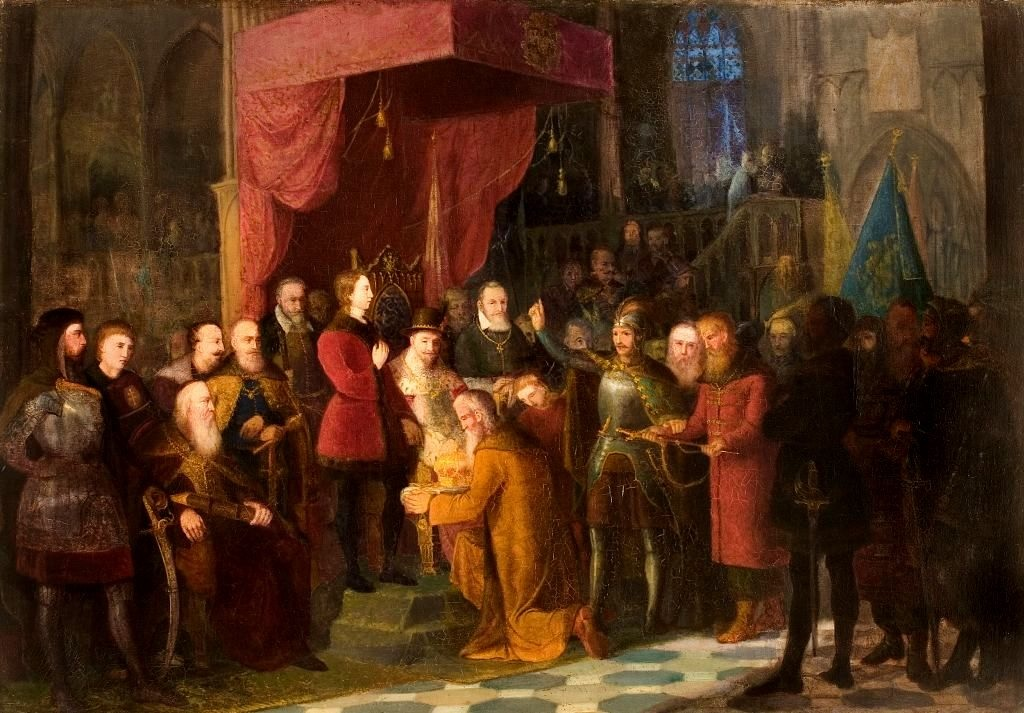
Czars Shuysky introduced by Hetman Stanislaw Zolkiewski of parliament in Warsaw before King Sigismund III, Jan Matejko, 1853

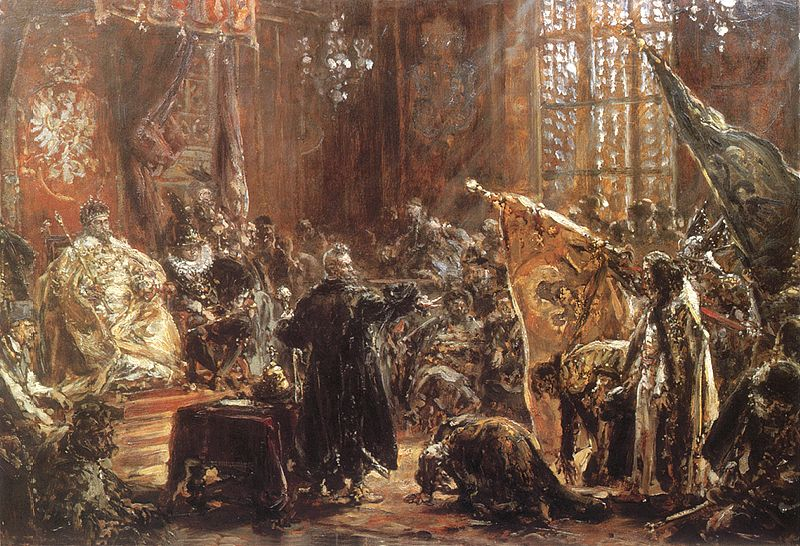
Shuisky Czars at the polish parliament in Warsaw, sketch for the painting Jan Matejko

Shuisky tribute was the act of homage of the deposed Mickail Shuisky of Russia and his retinue to the Polish King Sigismund III Vasa and teenage prince Władysław (the then-heir to the Russian throne) on October 29, 1611, in the Senate Hall of the Royal Castle in Warsaw.

Hetman of the Crown Stanisław Żółkiewski, who had captured Moscow the previous year, held a victory procession to the Royal Palace through the city of Warsaw, during which he led the prisoners: the former Russian tsar Vasily IV Shuysky, his two brothers Ivan and Dmitry, the wife of the latter, Grand Duchess Ekaterina Grigoryevna (a daughter of Ivan the Terrible's associate Malyuta Skuratov and sister of a former tsarina, the spouse of Tsar Boris Godunov), military commander Mikhail Shein, and Patriarch Filaret who would ascend to power in Russia later on as the father and de facto ruler behind the back of his son Michael I of Russia, the founder of the Romanov Dynasty.

== Background ==
The internal and external policies of Ivan the Terrible led to a lasting power crisis that also extinguished the direct line of the Rurikids early on. Sigismund III saw this as an opportunity to conclude a personal union with Moscow. He hoped that after uniting Polish and Russian forces he could successfully compete for the Swedish crown. The staunchly Catholic King of Poland was supported in his ambition by Pope Clement VIII, who hoped to increase his influence over the Russian Orthodox Church. After Sigismund III's negotiations with Moscow proved unsuccessful, the Poles invaded Russia in 1604 and took Moscow, introducing Sigismund III's protege, False Dmitry, to the throne.

In 1606 in Moscow an anti-Polish uprising broke out, headed by Vasily Shuysky. After the mob killed False Dmitry and massacred foreigners, Vasily Shuisky was elected tsar, and in 1608 signed a truce with the Polish king. However, fearing Poland and the lack of his subjects' support, he concluded a pact of alliance with Sweden. This event became the pretext for yet another Polish expedition to Russia.

On June 24, 1610, the Russian forces suffered their major defeat in the Battle of Klushino, mainly due to the mismanagement of Dmitry Shuysky. On June 27, the group of Seven Boyars deposed Tsar Vasily and made him a monk against his will to ensure his political death. In September 1610, the Seven Boyars, who now constituted the provisional government, handed Vasily and other members of the Russian royalty over to the Polish forces.

A year later, on October 29, 1611, Hetman Żółkiewski, in a solemn procession, marched his army into Warsaw bringing Vasily Shuysky and his brothers Dmitry and Ivan with him. In the presence of the nobility and the Senate they gave the oath of allegiance to King Sigismund III Vasa.

== Monuments and paintings ==
The place of Shuysky Tribute today (2011) does not carry any special inscription neither in the Royal Castle of Warsaw nor in the city of Warsaw. Trophies and other material objects brought over with Shuysky were consistently removed and destroyed in the name of Russian raison d'etat.

=== Paintings ===
Two large paintings by Tommaso Dolabella, of Tsar Vasili IV Shuysky paying homage to Sigismund III, and of the Polish capture of Smolensk, were looted by the Russian army in 1707 when the Royal Castle in Warsaw was captured by Tsar Peter I. According to another version of the images (ceilings from the floor of the Senate) they gave King August II insistent requests in 1716. Tsar Peter I still believed to be missing. One of the missing paintings by Tommaso Dolabella to pay homage to Sigismund III by Vasili IV is a known engraving of Tomasz Makowski and copies or other recognized tribute from Vasili IV the image coming from collections in the castle Pidhirtsi.

Shuyskys tribute tsars became the subject of the picture John Cantius Szwedkowsky and two paintings of Jan Matejko - youth of 1853 and the sketch to the image, which the artist could not paint.

=== Chapel of Moscow – the tomb of Vasili IV ===
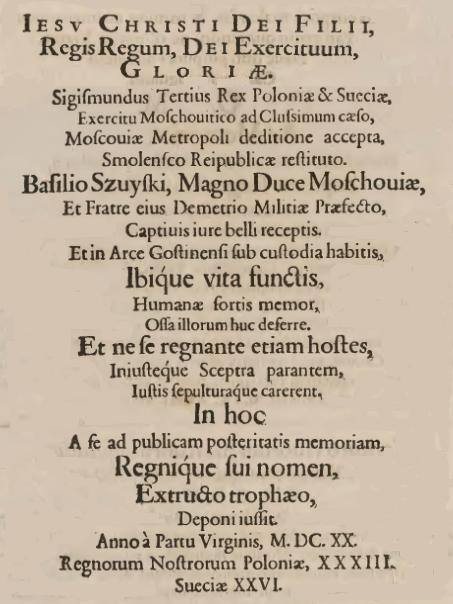
Plaque on the tomb of Vasili IV and his brother Dmitri

King Sigismund III Vasa built a tomb for the captive Shuysky brothers in 1620. The Chapel of Moscow in Warsaw that contained it ceased to exist around 1768. Above the entrance to the chapel was a plaque reading as follows:

| Latin text | English translation |
|---|---|
| Jesu Christi Dei Filii, Regis Regum, Dei Exercituum, Gloriæ. Sigismundus Tertius Rex Poloniæ & Sueciæ Exercitu Moschovitico ad Clussinum cæso, Moscoviæ Metropoli deditione accepta, Smolensco Republicæ restitutio. Basilio Szuyski, Magno Duce Moschoviæ, Et Fratre eius Demetrio Militiæ Præfecto, Captiuis iure belli receptis. Et in Arce Gostiniensi sub custodia habitis, Ibique vita functis, Humanæ fortis memor, Ossa illorum huc deferre. Et ne se regnante etiam hostes, Iniusteque Sceptra parantem, Iustis sepulturaque carerent. In hoc A se ad publicam posteritatis memoriam, Regnique sui nomen, Extructo trophæo, Deponi iussit. Anno à Partu Virginis, M. DC. XX. Regnorum Nostrum Poloniæ, XXXIII. Sueciæ XXVI. | To Jesus Christ the Son of God, King of Kings, the Lord of hosts, Glory. Sigismund the Third King of Poland and Sweden, having defeated the Muscovite army at Klushino, accepted the surrender of the capital of Muscovy and restored the Republic of Smolensk. Vasily Shuysky, Grand Duke of Moscow, and his brother Dmitri, army commander, having been taken prisoner according to the law of war, and having been kept under guard in the Castle Gostynihskie, and there lived his life, mindful of human fate, his bones transferred here, lest, while ruling himself, the one unjustly wielding the scepter should deprive the righteous enemies of burial. This monument he ordered to be erected for the public, in the form of a trophy, for posterity and the name of his kingdom. In the year from the birth of the Virgin 1620, of our reign in Poland 33, in Sweden 26. |

=== Plaque on Sigismund's column ===
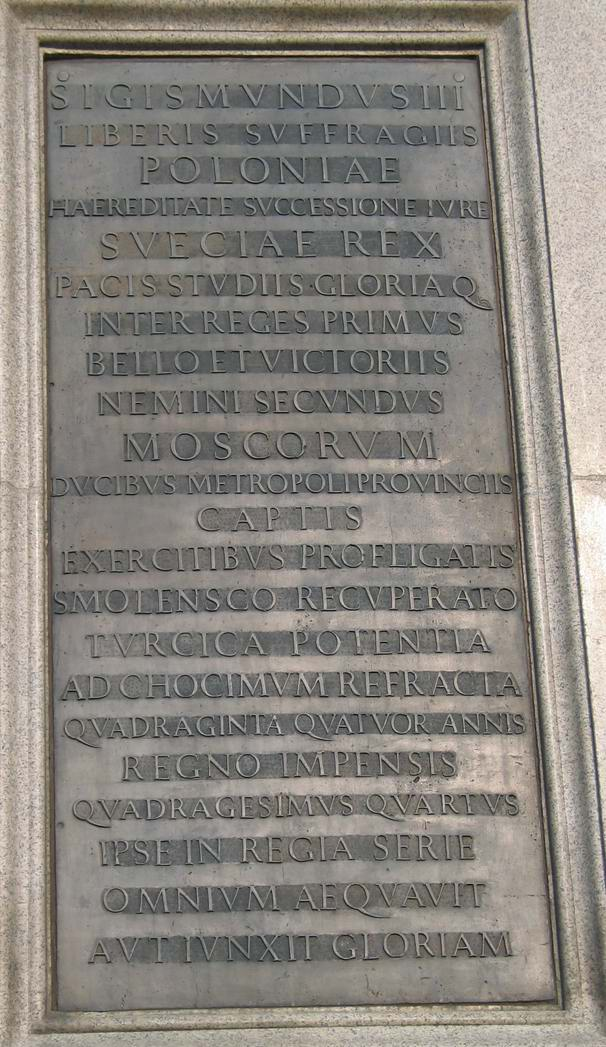
Western plaque on Sigismund's column

The only indirect commemoration of the success of King Sigismund III is a western plaque text in Latin located on Sigismund's column.

| Latin text | English translation |
|---|---|
| SIGISMVUNDUS III LIBERIS SVFFRAGIIS POLONIAE HAEREDITATE SVCCESSIONE IVRE SVECIAE REX PACIS STVDIIS GLORIAQ INTER REGES PRIMVS BELLO ET VICTORIIS NEMINI SECVNDVS MOSCORVM DVCIBVS METROPOLI PROVINCIIS CAPTIIS EXERCITIBVS PROFLIGATIS SMOLENSCO RECVPERATO TVRCIA POTENTIA AD CHIOCIMVM REFRACTA QVADRAGINTA QVATVOR ANNIS REGNO IMPRENSIS QVADRAGESIMVS QVARTVS IPSE IN REGIA SERIE OMNIVM AEQVAVIT AVT IVNXIT GLORIAM | King Sigismund III by virtue of a free election, the Polish king, by virtue of inheritance, succession and the law, the king of Sweden, in the love of peace and glory first among kings, in war and victories not inferior to anyone, he led captivity chiefs [of Moscow], the capital and the earth Moscow won, army routed regained Smolensk, broke Chocim power of Turkey, reigned for forty-four years in a number forty-fourth king, equaled the glory of everything and took her [praise] all |

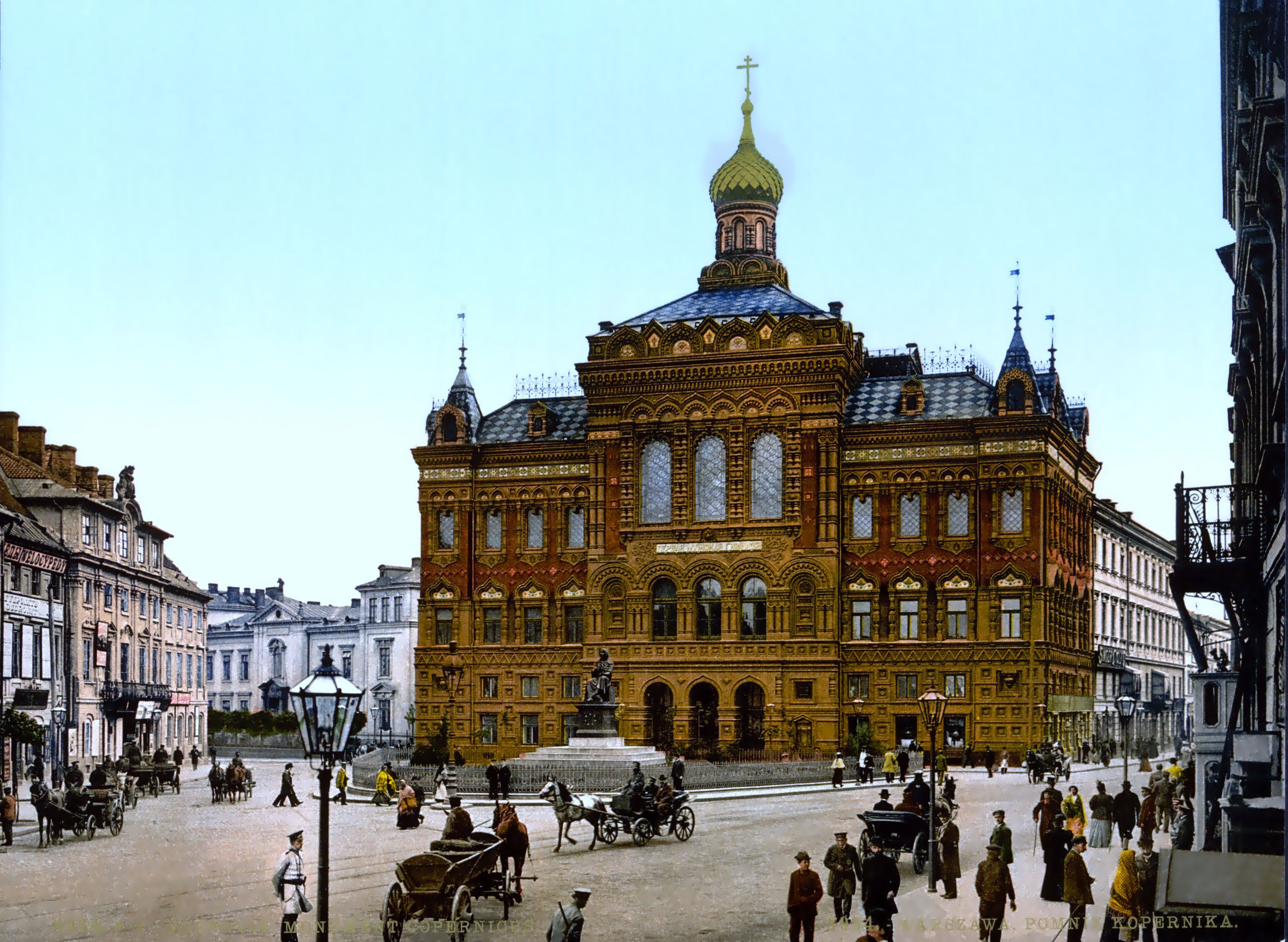
Staszic palace reconstruction in Byzantine-Ruthenian style, designed by Vladimir Pokrovsky after 1895.

== Request a pretext Russia's rulers terms of Polish kings ==
Iconography tribute Szujskich, descriptions of the event and the Chapel of Moscow were the pretexts of a number of demands made by the following representatives of the Romanov dynasty rulers of the Republic in the seventeenth and eighteenth centuries.

Tsar Vasily IV Shuysky remained in Polish captivity after his dethronement July 17, 1610, at the time the Czar of Moscow and all was Prince Ladislaus IV Vasa. Still, Chapel Moscow and other items documenting stay in the Republic tsar Wasyl IV Shuysky and his family were "salt in the eye," later rulers of the Romanov dynasty. In times of Tsar Michael I Romanov page Moscow started negotiations to recover the bodies of Tsar Vassily IV Shuysky and his family.

After the peace in Polanów the bodies of the Tsar, his brother, and Princess Yekaterina Russia were released in 1635. In 1647 the Tsar Alexei Romanov I received a request hand of Moscow, the Moscow to demolish the chapel, but the king Ladislaus IV refused, passing that it can return an array headstone. Subsequent requests related descriptions Polish triumph. Anyone who described the tribute to Tsar Shausky in the Parliament of the Republic could expect that Mr requested by the burning of Moscow and head writer works as redress insults tsarist majesty. In 1678 during the reign of King John III Sobieski he received a request Tsar Fedor Romanov for the issuance of two paintings by Tommaso Dolabella from the Royal Palace depicting a tribute to Tsar Vassily Shuysky with his brothers Dmitri and Ivan called Russian. Pugowka (pol. Button) before King Sigismund III Vasa, as abusive tsarist majesty. Requests it has and these images that are believed to still be missing, handed Tsar Peter I King August II the Strong.

In the period between the years 1764–1768, with the recommendation Russian envoy Nikolai Repnin excavated and preserved destroyed an array of Chapel of Moscow foundation of King Zygmunt III Vasa.

In the years 1892–1895, at the time of the Russian occupation, on the initiative of Alexander Apuchtina rebuilt Palace of Science and Technology in the Byzantine-Ruthenian style, designed by Russian architect Vladimir Pokrovsky and established in the building of the palace church of St. Tatiana of Rome in order to destroy the architecture Corazzi and that "... forever in the memory of Poles bury memories of previous Polish building, thought and effort of Science and Technology built ..." - the pretext was the alleged existence at this point of the Moscow Chapel with the tomb of Tsar Vassily Shuysky.

In 1954 in the communist era the eighteenth-century rotunda was dismantled. Street. Swietokrzyska 1 due to the recognition of her before 1939 for the remains of the Chapel of Moscow.

== Bibliography ==
- Oddanie tryumfalne Wasilia Szuyskiego Cara Moskiewskiego, i z bracią Jego królewskiey Mości na seymie w Warszawie, przez hetmana koronnego P. Stanisława Żółkiewskiego, który woyska wielke Moskiewskie pod Kluzinem poraziwszy, stolicę Moskiewską spaliwszy, Cara tego poimał.
- Z rękopisu biblioteki X.A.C.. "Pamiętnik lwowski". t. 1 nr 3 – 3/4 (I), s. 1–6, 1818.
- Julian Ursyn Niemcewicz: Dzieje panowania Zygmunta III. 1836.
- Janusz Byliński: Sejm z roku 1611. Wrocław: Zakład Narodowy im. Ossolińskich, 1970, s. 246. OCLC 575741424
- Antoni Prochaska: Hetman Stanisław Żółkiewski. Warszawa: 1927, s. 419. OCLC 11922255 (in Polish)
- Wacław Sobieski: Żółkiewski na Kremlu. Warszawa: Gebethner i Wolff, 1925, s. 217. OCLC 723520074 (in Polish)
- Andrzej Chojnowski, Halina Manikowska: Historia. Warszawa: 1995, s. 189–190, seria: Vademecum maturzysty. ISBN 8385394397
- Adam Węgłowski (2011-10-22), Hołd ruski
