= Tomasz Makowski =

Tomasz Makowski may refer to:

- Tomasz Makowski (artist) (1575-1630)
- Tomasz Makowski (librarian) (born 1970)
- Tomasz Makowski (footballer) (born 1999)
