= Mstislavsky =

Mstislavsky Mścisławski
- Russian princely family
- Pogoń Litewska coat of arms, used by Mstislavsky family
- Parent family: Gediminas
- Place of origin: Mstislavl (Mstislaw)
- Founder: Jaunutis
- Titles: Prince (Knyaz)
- Members: Ivan, Fedor

The House of Mstislavsky (Russian: Мстисла́вский, romanized: Mstislávskiy, IPA: [msʲtʲɪˈsɫafskʲɪj]; Polish: Mścisławski, IPA: [mɕt͡ɕiˈswaf.ski]) was a Russian princely family (knyazya) of Gediminid origin who prior to their move to Russia ruled the Principality of Mstislavl. In the following, the Mstislavsky family produced some notable military commanders such as Ivan Mstislavsky who fought in the Livonian War. His son, Fedor Mstislavsky was one of the Russian magnates during the Time of Troubles and the leader of the Seven Boyars who temporarily ruled the country.
