= Fedor Mstislavsky =

Russian noble and statesman (died 1622)

Fedor Ivanovich Mstislavsky
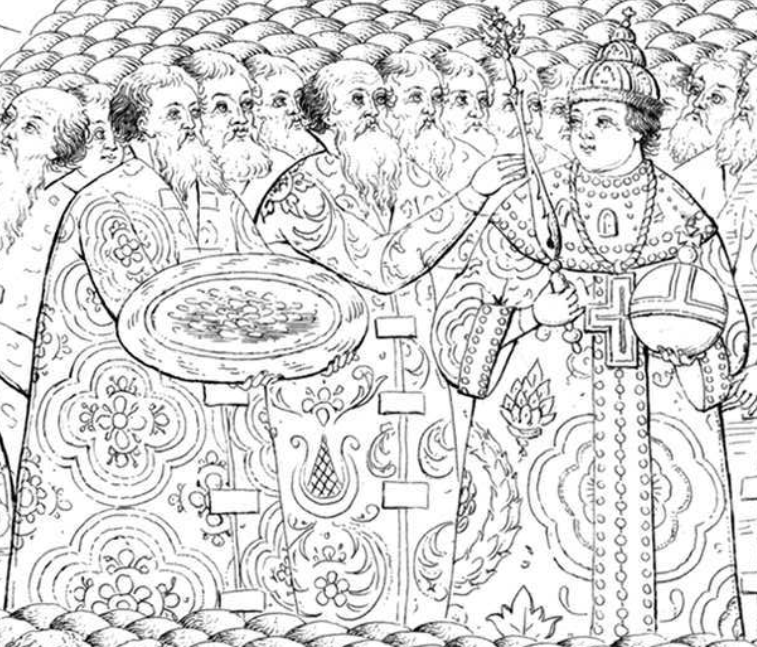
- Fedor Ivanovich Mstislavsky showers Tsar Michael with money at the latter's coronation

Leader of the Seven Boyars
- Tenure: July 17, 1610 – December 16, 1612
- Predecessor: Vasili IV (as Tsar of Russia)
- Successor: Dmitry Troubetskoy (as the leader of the Zemsky government)
- Died: 16 December 1622
- Noble family: Mstislavsky

Prince Fedor or Fyodor Ivanovich Mstislavsky (Russian: Фёдор Ива́нович Мстисла́вский, IPA: [ˈfʲɵdər ɪˈvanəvʲɪt͡ɕ msʲtʲɪˈsɫafskʲɪj]; d. 16 December 1622) was a Russian boyar and one of the leaders of the Boyar Duma. He was a leader of the Seven Boyars, who governed Russia for a brief period between 1610 and 1612, and the chairman of the Zemsky Sobor of 1613, which elected Michael Romanov as tsar of all Russia.

== Biography ==
He was a son of Ivan Fyodorovich Mstislavsky. Prince Fedor Mstislavsky became a public servant in 1575, during the reign of Ivan IV, and by the fall of next year, he had become a boyar and led a regiment in his father's army. In the fall of 1579, the prince was briefly appointed as the governor of Novgorod.

After the exile of his father in 1586, he was appointed a member of the Boyar Duma, a position that he would keep for over 36 years and at the same time, became the highest-paid person in Russia, with an income of 1.200 rubles a year. He was once considered a candidate for the throne after the death of Tsar Fedor in 1598.

He led the government forces against False Dmitry I. After the impostor seized power, he was able to retain his position and influence. In 1606, he switched sides again and participated in the conspiracy against False Dmitry.

After the overthrow of Vasili IV in 1610, the political influence of Mstislavsky increased. He led the Seven Boyars (1610–1612) and negotiated with the Poles. After the liberation of Moscow from the Poles, Mstislavsky participated in the election of Mikhail Romanov as the tsar of Russia.

Fedor Mstislavsky died on December 16, 1622. The Mstislavsky family ended because all the children of Fedor had died in infancy.
