= Tomasz Makowski (artist) =

Polish painter and typographer (c. 1575 – c. 1630)

Tomasz Makowski (c. 1575 – c. 1630) was a Polish–Lithuanian engraver.

== Biography ==
Makowski is credited with the earliest surviving engravings produced within the Polish-Lithuanian Commonwealth. Throughout his life, Makowski worked in Nyasvizh (a town in present-day Belarus) as an illustrator in the court of Prince Mikolaj Krzysztof Radziwill (1549–1616), a member of one of the most prominent families of the Grand Duchy of Lithuania. Here, he contributed illustrations to several books such as De Sanctis Angelis Libellus and Hippica: to Iest o Konniach Xiegi. Alongside his book illustrations, he also worked on single-sheet engravings.

One of Makowski's largest projects was to illustrate the treatise, Hippica: to Iest o Konniach Xiegi by Krzysztof Moniwid Dorohostajski (1562–1615). Hippica consists of four main "books" which contain a total of forty-four engraved illustrations, along with a lavish title-page—all probably done by Makowski. Each book focuses on a different aspect of equine life: the first book focuses on horse characteristics and breeding; the second focuses on foals and stables; the third focuses on riding equipment; and the fourth focuses on equine medicine. Hippica was the most richly illustrated publication of its time, and it remained so for several years. Forty of the engravings in Hippica contain bits (a metal bar used to control the horse), which was not unusual for the time. In fact, bits were a common feature of sixteenth-century equestrian literature, with many books centering on equestrian training. However, Makowski's engravings unprecedentedly combined these bits with horses and landscapes in the same image. Neither the horse, nor the landscape were relevant to the text, suggesting that their addition was an aesthetic decision, contributing to the book's lavish nature.

== Sources ==
- Adam Perzyński, 'Tomasz Makowski's Illustrations for Hippica (1603), Print Quarterly, vol. xlii, no.1 (March 2025), pp. 3–19. "repozytorium.uw.edu.pl/server/api/core/bitstreams/8198c8be-1f4a-4cd0-ade8-8626773e33ba/content". repozytorium.uw.edu.pl.
- Karol Estreicher, Bibliografia Polska [Polish bibliography], XV, Kraków, 1897, p. 292.
- J.Talbierska, Grafka XVII wieku w Polsce: Funkcje, Ośrodki, Artyści, Dzieła [seventeenth-century printmaking in Poland: functions, centres, artists, work], Warsaw, 2001, p. 123.
