= Seven Boyars =

Group of Russian nobles

The Seven Boyars (Russian: Семибоярщина, romanized: Semiboyarshchina, lit. 'Rule of the Seven Boyars', 'the Deeds of the Seven Boyars' or (potentially slightly disparagingly) 'the Seven-Boyar affair') were a group of Russian nobles who deposed Tsar Vasili Shuisky on 27 July [O.S. 17 July] 1610 and later that year, after Russia lost the Battle of Klushino during the Polish–Russian War, acquiesced to the Polish–Lithuanian occupation of Moscow.

The seven were Princes Fedor Mstislavsky (the leader of the group), Ivan Vorotynsky, Andrei Trubetskoy, Andrei Golitsyn, Boris Lykov-Obolensky, and Boyars Ivan Romanov and Fyodor Sheremetev. Due to the Polish advance into Russia, the uprising of Bolotnikov in 1606–07, and other unrest during the Time of Troubles from 1598 to 1613, Shuisky (r. 1606–1610) was never very popular, nor was he able to effectively rule outside of the capital itself. The seven deposed him and he was forcibly tonsured as a monk in the Chudov Monastery of the Kremlin. (Stanisław Żółkiewski later carried Shuisky off to Poland, where he died in prison at Gostynin near Warsaw in 1612.)

On 27 August [O.S. 17 August] 1610, the seven agreed to accept Władysław, the eldest son of King Sigismund III Vasa of Poland, as Tsar of Russia. The Poles entered the city on 1 October [O.S. 21 September]. While some consider the rule of the seven in Moscow to have lasted only from about July 1610 until the arrival of the Poles in October, others regard their rule to have lasted until the Poles were driven from Moscow by the popular movement headed by Kuzma Minin, and Princes Dmitry Pozharsky and Dmitry Troubetskoy in 1612. Their power to act after October 1610, however, was rather nominal.

== See also ==
- Seven Bankers
