= Tommaso Dolabella =

Italian painter (1570–1650)

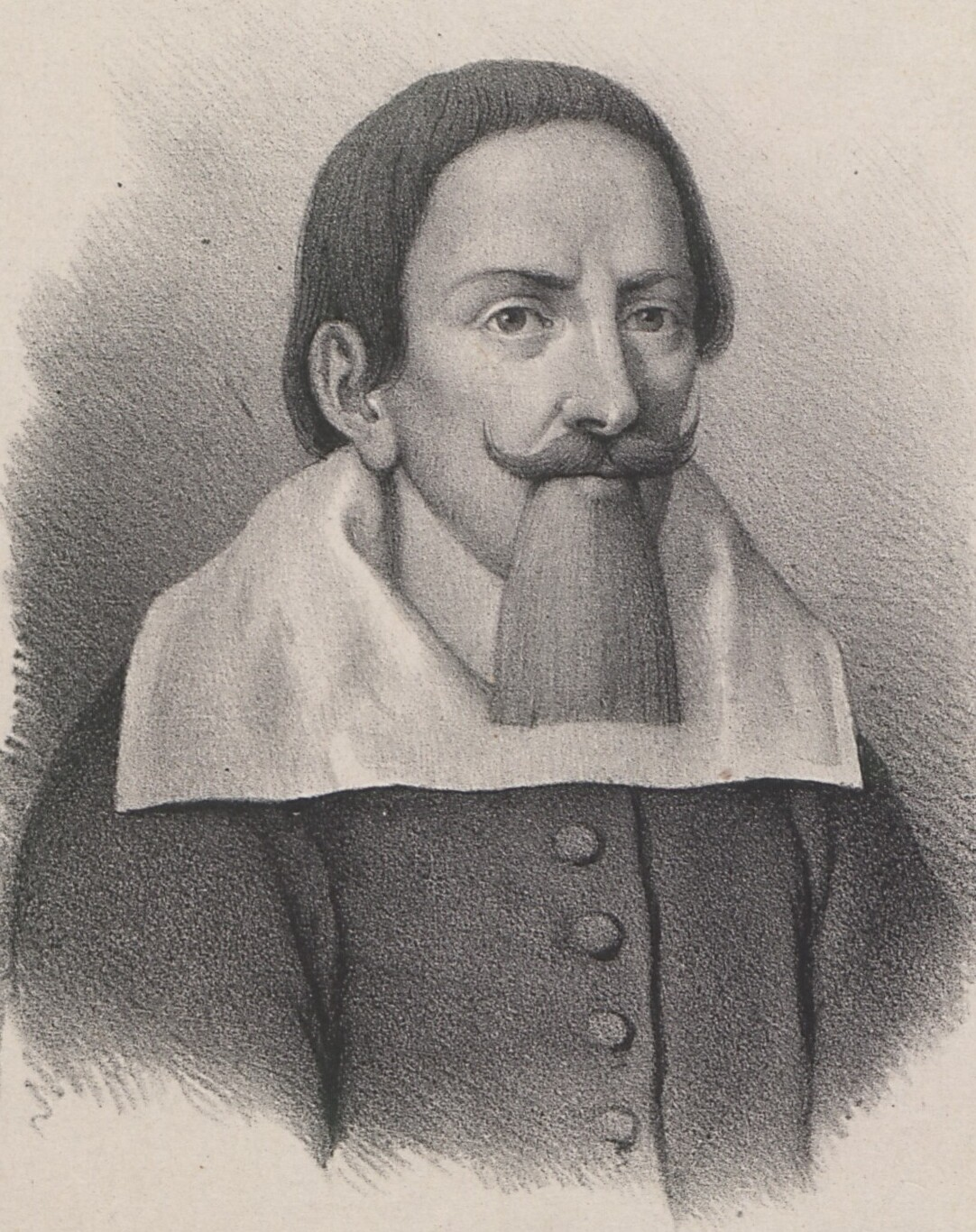
Tommaso Dolabella; Posthumous portrait by Jan Feliks Piwarski

Tommaso Dolabella (Polish: Tomasz Dolabella; 1570 – 17 January 1650) was a Baroque Italian painter from Venice, who settled in the Polish–Lithuanian Commonwealth at the royal court of King Sigismund III Vasa.

Active in the historical capital city of Kraków, where his huge canvas paintings were displayed in Gothic churches around the central districts, including the historical suburb of Kazimierz near the Vistula River. Only a few of them have survived, most notably in the local Dominican church and the Corpus Christi Basilica. He was later supported by Sigismund's son, Władysław IV Vasa. In Warsaw he opened a workshop for artists. Some of his paintings glorifying Poland over Russia, after Sigismund's successful military campaigns in Muscovy, were destroyed on the orders of Tsar Peter the Great. Most notably one of those paintings depicted Polish commander and Hetman, Stanisław Żółkiewski, leading a line of left over Russian prisoners after the Battle of Klushino, where the Polish army completely annihilated the enemy.

He died in Kraków.
