= List of Russian royal consorts =

Spouses of the Russian monarchs

The Russian consorts were the spouses of the Russian rulers. They used the titles Princess, Grand Princess, Tsarina or Empress.

== Princesses and grand princesses consort of Kiev ==
Name (House)	Father	Birth	Marriage	Became consort	Ceased to be consort	Death	Spouse
Unknown	-	-	-	-	-	-	Oleg the Wise
Olga	-	c.890	c.903	914	945	969	Igor I
Malusha	-	-	-	-	-	-	Sviatoslav I
a Greek nun	-	-	-	-	-	-	Yaropolk I
Allogia	-	-	-	-	-	-	Volodimer I
a Greek nun, widow of Yaropolk I	-	-	-	-	-	-	Volodimer I
Rogned' of Polotsk	Rogvolod	962	-	-	988	1002	Volodimer I
Adela	-	-	-	-	-	-	Volodimer I
Malfrida	-	-	-	-	1000	-	Volodimer I
Anna Porphyrogenita (Macedonian dynasty)	Romanos II; Byzantine Emperor	13 March 963	989		1011		Volodimer I
Unknown (Ottonians)	a granddaughter of emperor Otto the Great	-	-	-	-	-	Volodimer I
Unknown (Piasts)	Bolesław I the Brave; Duke of Poland	-	1013		1018		Sviatopolk I
Ingegerd Olofsdotter (Munsö)	Olof Skötkonung; King of Sweden	1001	1019		1050		Yaroslav I
Gertrude of Poland (Piasts)	Mieszko II of Poland; King of Poland	1025	1054		1073	1104	Iziaslav I
Cecilia (Note: Slavonic: Killikiya or Kelikia.)	-	-	1043–1047		-	-	Sviatoslav II
Oda of Stade (Udonids)	Lothair Udo I Margrave of Nordmark	c. 1040	c. 1065	1073	1076	1087	Sviatoslav II
Maria (?) (Macedonian dynasty?)	possibly Constantine IX Monomachos; Byzantine Emperor	-	-	-	-	1067	Vsevolod I
Anna Polovetskaya	Cuman khan	-	1068		1093	1111	Vsevolod I
- (Přemyslid dynasty?)	possibly Spytihněv II; Duke of Bohemia	-	-	-	-	-	Sviatopolk II
Olena	Tugorkhan of the Kypchaks	-	1094	-	-	-	Sviatopolk II
Gytha of Wessex (House of Godwin)	Harold Godwinson; King of England	c. 1053/1061	-	-	-	1098 or 1107	Volodimer II
Eufimia (Byzantine noblewoman)		-	-	-	-	1107	Volodimer II
Christina Ingesdotter (Stenkil)	Inge the Elder; King of Sweden	-	1090–1096	She was his consort before he became Grand Prince of Kiev		18 January 1122	Mstislav I
Ljubava Saviditsch	Dmitry Saviditsch, a nobleman of Novgorod	-	-	-	-	-	Mstislav I
Helena (Ossetian princess)	-	-	-	-	-	-	Yaropolk II
Maria Mstislavna of Kiev (Olgovichi of Chernigov)	Mstislav I Grand Prince of Kiev	-	1116	1139	-	1179	Vsevolod II
Agnes (Hohenstaufen)	Conrad III; King of Germany	c. 1117	c. 1130	1146; 1151	1149; 1151	1151	Iziaslav II
Princess Bagrationi (Bagrationi)	Demetrius I King of Georgia	-	1154			1210	Iziaslav II
Unknown	Aepa, son of Osen'; Cuman prince	-	1108	-	-	-	Yuri I
Helena (Komnenos?)	possibly Isaac Komnenos; Byzantine sebastokrator	-	-	-	-	-	Yuri I
Agnes of Poland (Piasts)	Bolesław III Wrymouth; Duke of Poland	1137	1151	1167	1170	1182	Mstislav II
Unknown (Vukanović)	Beloš Vukanović; Prince of Serbia	-	1150	-	-	-	Volodimer III
Verkhuslava of Kiev (Yurievichi of Suzdalia)	Vsevolod the Big Nest; Prince of Vladimir	1181	1189	1204	1206	1222	Rostislav II
Anna II of Kiev (Iziaslavichi of Turov)	Yuri of Turov	c. 1157	1172	intermittently since 1173	1205	1205	Rurik Rostislavich
Constance of Hungary (Árpáds)	Béla IV; King of Hungary	c. 1237	c. 1246/7	1271	1288/1302	1288/1302	Leo I

== Grand Princesses of Vladimir ==
=== Yurievichi (1157–1331) ===
Picture	Name	Father	Birth	Marriage	Became Consort	Ceased to be Consort	Death	Spouse
-	Ulita Stepanovna	-	-	1148	1157	1175		Andrey I
-	Unknown	-	-	1175	-	-	-	Yaropolk III
-	Maria Shvarnovna	Shvarn Zhiroslavich	10 August 1155	1172-4	20 June 1174	19 March 1205		Vsevolod III
-	Agatha Mikhailovich of Chernigov	Vsevolod IV of Kiev; Grand Prince of Kiev (Rurikids)	1194	1211	1212	February 7, 1238		Yury II
-	Fedosia Igorevna of Ryazan	Igor Glebovich, Prince of Ryazan (Rurikids)	-	1218	-	-	-	Yaroslav II
-	Alexandra Bryachislavna of Polotsk	Bryacheslav Vasilkovich, Prince of Polotsk and Vitebsk (Rurikids)	1222	1239	1252	14 November 1263	13th century	Alexander Nevsky
-	Xenia of Tarusa	Youri Mikhailovich, Prince of Tarusa possibly (Rurikids)	c. 1246	1265		1271	1312	Yaroslav III
-	Unknown	Dmitry Borisovich of Rostov (Rurikids)	-	-	-	-	-	Andrey III
	Anna of Kashin	Dmitry Borisovich of Rostov (Rurikids)	1280	8 November 1294	27 July 1304	22 November 1318	2 October 1368	Mikhail of Tver
-	Anastasia of Halych	Yuri I of Galicia (Rurikids)	1296	1320	1326	1327	1364/5	Aleksander of Tver

== Grand Princesses of Moscow ==
=== Daniilovichi (1283–1547) ===
Picture	Name	Father	Birth	Marriage	Became Consort	Ceased to be Consort	Death	Spouse
-	Maria	-	-	-	-	-	-	Daniel
-	?	Prince Konstantin Borisovich of Rostov (Rurikids)	-	-	1297	before 1316		Yury
-	Konchaka-Agafia	Togrilcha (Borjigids)	-	1316		1318		Yury
-	Helena	-	-	-	-	1 March 1331		Ivan I
-	Alexandra	-	-	1332		31 March 1340 husband's death	mid 1360s	Ivan I
-	Aigusta Anastasia of Lithuania	Gediminas, Grand Duke of Lithuania (Gediminids)	-	Winter of 1333	31 March 1340 husband's accession	11 March 1345		Simeon
-	Eupraxia Feodorovna of Smolensk	Feodor Sviatoslavich, Prince of Dorogobuzh and Viazma (Rurikids)	-	1345		1346 repudiated	-	Simeon
-	Maria Alexandrovna of Tver	Aleksandr Mikhailovich of Tver (Rurikids)	-	-		27 April 1353 husband's death	-	Simeon
-	Alexandra Vasilyevna Velyaminova	Vasily Velyaminov, Mayor of Moscow	-	1345	27 April 1353 husband's accession	13 November 1359 husband's death	26 December 1364	Ivan II
	Eudoxia Dmitriyevna of Suzdal	Dmitry III, Grand Duke of Vladimir-Suzdal (Rurikids)	-	18 January 1367		19 May 1389 husband's death	7 July 1407	Dmitry I
	Sophia of Lithuania	Vytautas, Grand Duke of Lithuania (Gediminids)	c. 1371	21 January 1391		27 February 1425 husband's death	13 July 1453	Vasily I
-	Maria Yaroslavna of Borovsk	Yaroslav Vladimirovich, Prince of Maloyaroslavets (Rurikids)	-	8 March 1433		27 March 1462 husband's death	4 July 1485	Vasily II
-	Maria Borisovna of Tver	Boris of Tver (Rurikids)	c. 1442	4 June 1452	27 March 1462 husband's accession	22 April 1467		Ivan III
	Zoe Palaiologina	Thomas Palaeologus, Despot of Morea (Palaeologos)	c. 1455	12 November 1472		7 April 1503		Ivan III
	Solomonia Yuryevna Saburova	Yury Konstantinovich Saburov (Godunov)	c. 1490	4 September 1505	6 November 1505 husband's accession	November 1525 marriaged annulled	18 December 1542	Vasily III
	Elena Vasilyevna Glinskaya	Prince Vasili Lvovich Glinsky (Glinski)	c. 1506/1507	21 January 1526		3 December 1533 husband's death	4 April [O.S. 13 April] 1538	Vasily III

== Tsarinas of Russia ==
=== Daniilovichi (1547–98) ===
Picture	Name	Father	Birth	Marriage	Became Consort	Ceased to be Consort	Death	Spouse
	Anastasia Romanovna Zakharyina-Yurieva	Roman Yurievich Zakharyin-Yuriev (Romanov)	1530	3/13 February 1547		7 August 1560		Ivan IV
	Maria Temryukovna born Kučenej	Temrjuk of Kabardia	1544	21 August 1561		1 September 1569		Ivan IV
	Marfa Vasilevna Sobakina	Vasiliy Sobakin	1552	28 October 1571		13 November 1571		Ivan IV
	Anna Alexeievna Koltovskaya	Alexei Koltovski	----	29 April 1572		1574 repudiated by her husband (sent to monastery)	5 April 1626	Ivan IV
	Anna Vasilchikova	----	----	January 1575 (the wedding wasn't authorized by the Church)		1576/77 repudiated by her husband (sent to monastery)		Ivan IV
	Maria Feodorovna Nagaya	Feodor Nagoy	----	September 1580 or 1581 (the wedding wasn't authorized by the Church)		18 March 1584 husband's death	1608 or 20 August 1612	Ivan IV
	Irina Feodorovna Godunova	Feodor Ivanovich Godunov (Godunov)	1557	1580	18 March 1584	16/17 January 1598 husband's death	27 October 1603	Feodor I

=== Time of Troubles (1598–1613) ===
Picture	Name	Father	Birth	Marriage	Became Consort	Coronation	Ceased to be Consort	Death	Spouse
	Maria Grigorievna Skuratova-Belskaya	Grigory Lukyanovich Skuratov-Belskiy (Skuratova-Belskaya)	----	1570/1571	7 January 1598 husband's accession	----	23 April [O.S. 13 April] 1605 husband's death	10 June 1605	Boris Godunov
	Marina Yuryevna Mniszech	Jerzy Mniszech (Mniszech)	c. 1588	8 May 1606		8 May 1606	17 May 1606 husband's desposition	24 December 1614	False Dmitry I False Dmitry II
	Maria Petrovna Buynosova-Rostovskaya born Ekaterina	Prince Peter Ivanovich Buynosov-Rostov (Buynosov-Rostov)	c. 1586	17 January 1608		----	19 July 1610 husband's desposition	2 January 1626	Vasily IV

=== House of Romanov (1613–1721) ===
Picture	Name	Father	Birth	Marriage	Became Consort	Ceased to be Consort	Death	Spouse
	Maria Vladimirovna Dolgorukova	Prince Vladimir Timofeyevich Dolgorukov (Dolgoruki)	1601	19 September 1624		17 January 1625		Michael I
	Eudoxia Lukyanovna Streshnyova	Lukyan Stepanovich Streshnyov (Streshnyov)	1608	5 February 1626		12 July 1645 husband's death	18 August 1645	Michael I
	Maria Ilyinichna Miloslavskaya	Ilya Danilovich Miloslavsky (Miloslavsky)	1625	26 January 1648		2/3 March 1669		Alexis
	Natalya Kirillovna Naryshkina	Kirill Poluektovich Naryshkin (Naryshkin)	1 September 1651	1 February 1671		29 January 1676 husband's death	4 February 1694	Alexis
	Agafiya Semyonovna Grushetskaya	Simeon Feodorovich Grushetsky (Grushetsky)	1663	28 July 1680		24 July 1681		Feodor III
	Marfa Matveyevna Apraksina	Matvei Vasilievich Apraksin (Apraksin)	1664	24 February 1682		7 May 1682 husband's death	11 January 1716	Feodor III
	Praskovya Fyodorovna Saltykova	Feodor Petrovich Saltykov (Saltykov)	12 October 1664	9 January 1684		8 February 1696 husband's death	13 October 1723	Ivan V
	Eudoxia Feodorovna Lopukhina	Feodor Abramovich Lopukhin (Lopukhin)	9 August 1669	6 February 1689		1698 divorce	7 September 1731	Peter I
	Catherine Alexeyevna born Marta Helena Skowrońska	Samuel Skowroński (Skavronsky)	15 April 1684 (New Style)	19 February 1712		22 October 1721 became empress	17 May 1727 (New Style)	Peter I

== Empresses of Russia ==
=== House of Romanov (1721–62) ===
Picture	Name	Father	Birth	Marriage	Became Consort	Coronation	Ceased to be Consort	Death	Spouse
	Catherine Alexeyevna born Marta Helena Skowrońska	Samuel Skowroński (Skavronsky)	15 April 1684 (New Style)	19 February 1712	22 October 1721; Empire proclaimed	7 May 1724 crowned as co-ruler	8 February 1725 husband's death & became Empress regnant	17 May 1727 (New Style)	Peter I

=== House of Holstein-Gottorp-Romanov (1762–1917) ===
Picture	Arms	Name	Father	Birth	Marriage	Became Consort	Coronation	Ceased to be Consort	Death	Spouse
		Catherine Alekseyevna born Sophie of Anhalt-Zerbst	Christian August, Prince of Anhalt-Zerbst (Ascania)	2 May 1729 (New Style)	21 August 1745	5 January 1762 husband's accession	22 September 1762 crowned as Empress Regnant	9 July 1762 husband's abdication & became Empress Regnant	17 November 1796	Peter III
		Maria Feodorovna born Sophie Dorothea of Württemberg	Friedrich II Eugen, Duke of Württemberg (Württemberg)	25 October 1759	26 September 1776	6 November 1796 husband's accession	5 April 1797	23 March 1801 husband's assassination	5 November 1828	Paul I
		Elizabeth Alexeievna born Louise of Baden	Charles Louis, Hereditary Prince of Baden (Zähringen)	24 January 1779	28 September 1793	24 March 1801 husband's accession	15 September 1801	1 December 1825 husband's death	16 May 1826	Alexander I
		Alexandra Feodorovna born Charlotte of Prussia	Frederick William III of Prussia (Hohenzollern)	13 July 1798	13 July 1817	1 December 1825 husband's accession	3 September 1826	2 March 1855 husband's death	1 November 1860	Nicholas I
		Maria Alexandrovna born Marie of Hesse and by Rhine	Louis II, Grand Duke of Hesse (Hesse-Darmstadt)	8 August 1824	16 April 1841	2 March 1855 husband's accession	7 September 1856	8 June 1880		Alexander II
		Maria Feodorovna born Dagmar of Schleswig-Holstein-Sonderburg-Glücksburg (Note: Created princess of Denmark at the age of 5, due to the election of her father as heir presumptive to the Danish throne. Thus, she was later known as Princess Dagmar of Denmark before her marriage.)	Christian IX of Denmark (Schleswig-Holstein-Sonderburg-Glücksburg)	26 November 1847	9 November 1866	13 March 1881 husband's accession	15 May 1883	1 November 1894 husband's death	13 October 1928	Alexander III
	Lesser arms of Empress Alexandra Feodorovna	Alexandra Feodorovna born Alix of Hesse and by Rhine	Louis IV, Grand Duke of Hesse (Hesse-Darmstadt)	6 June 1872	26 November 1894		16 May 1896	15 March 1917 husband's abdication	17 July 1918	Nicholas II

== Sources ==
- Hughes, Lindsey (2004). "Catherine I of Russia, Consort to Peter the Great". In Campbell Orr, Clarissa (ed.). Queenship in Europe 1660-1815: The Role of the Consort. Cambridge University Press. pp. 131–154. ISBN 0-521-81422-7.
- Martin, Janet (2007). Medieval Russia: 980–1584 (E-book) (Second ed.). Cambridge: Cambridge University Press. ISBN 978-0-511-36800-4.
