= Natalya Naryshkina =

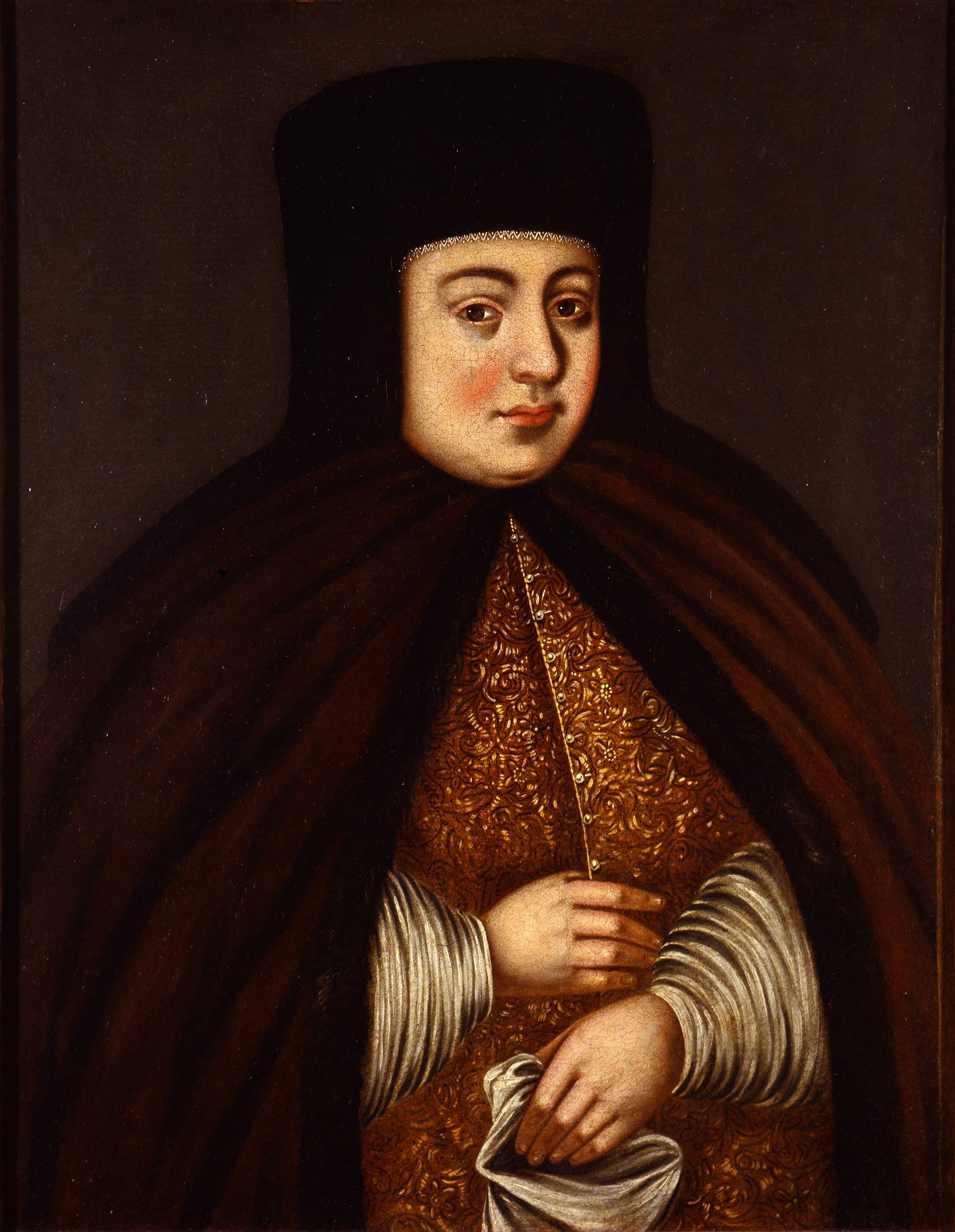
- Late 17th century portrait

Tsaritsa consort of All Russia
- Tenure: 1 February 1671 – 29 January 1676
- Predecessor: Maria Miloslavskaya
- Successor: Agafya Grushetskaya
- Born: 1 September 1651; Moscow, Tsardom of Russia
- Died: 4 February 1694 (aged 42); Moscow, Tsardom of Russia
- Burial: Ascension Convent; Archangel Cathedral (1929)
- Spouse: Alexis I of Russia (m. 1671; died 1676)
- Issue: Peter the Great; Tsarevna Natalya Alexeevna; Tsarevna Fyodora Alexeevna
Names
- Natalya Kirillovna Naryshkina
- House: Naryshkin
- Father: Kirill Poluektovich Naryshkin
- Mother: Anna Leontyevna Leontyeva
- Religion: Eastern Orthodox

Natalya Kirillovna Naryshkina (Russian: Ната́лья Кири́лловна Нары́шкина; 1 September 1651 – 4 February 1694) was Tsaritsa of Russia from 1671 to 1676 as the second wife of Tsar Alexis I of Russia, and twice regent of Russia as the mother of Tsar Peter the Great. She first became regent during the minority of her son Peter on 7 May 1682, but was swiftly deposed as regent by her step-daughter Sophia Alekseyevna on 15 May 1682. After Sophia was herself deposed in August 1689, Natalya Naryshkina was reinstated as regent. Her second regency lasted until her death in 1694.

== Life ==
Coming from a Russian noble family of Tatar descent, daughter of Kirill Poluektovich Naryshkin (1623–1691), and wife Anna Leontyevna Leontyeva (d. 1706, daughter of Leonty Dimitriyevich Leontyev and spouse Praskovya Ivanovna Rayevskaya who died in 1641), she was brought up in the house of the great Western-leaning boyar Artamon Matveyev. She was given a freer and more Western-influenced upbringing than most Russian women of the time.

=== Tsaritsa ===
In March 1669, Tsar Alexis Mikhailovich's first wife, Tsarina Maria Miloslavskaya, died during the birth of what would have been her fourteenth child. Despite their number, few of Alexis and Maria's children were healthy. Within six months of her death there were only two surviving sons, Feodor and Ivan, both of whom were weak or disabled. Alexis, supported by the Russian public, although not by the family of Maria, decided to remarry in the hope of producing more potential heirs. The tsar arranged an inspection of women he considered eligible in early 1670, Natalya who was 22 years younger than the Tsar and same age as the Tsar's eldest daughters was added to this inspection following an encounter with the tsar at the home of her adoptive father, Artamon Matveyev. Alexis was impressed by Natalya's beauty, and selected her to be his bride without needing to go ahead with a planned second inspection. Maria's family made an attempt to halt the marriage by alleging that Matveyev had used magic herbs on Alexis to deceive him regarding Natalya's beauty. These claims were investigated but eventually dismissed, and the couple married on 1 February 1671.

Alexis and Natalya had a happy marriage, spending much of their time together in various palaces and villas around Moscow. The couple's first child, the future emperor Peter the Great, was born in May 1672, followed by daughters Natalya and Theodora. The custom at that time was for the consort of the Tsar to maintain a low-key lifestyle, deferring in all matters to her husband and carrying out work in the household. Natalya, having been raised in a liberal western-inspired household, resented this and succeeded in gradually attaining more freedoms throughout her time as Tsaritsa, such as being allowed to ride in an open carriage and appearing in church without a veil. She loved dancing and visited diplomatic events, also she became the first woman to visit a theatre play.

She became widowed in 1676; a son from the Tsar's previous marriage ascended the throne as Feodor III. Feodor and his brother Ivan treated their stepmother with affection, always referring to her as "Mama".

=== First Regency of Natalya ===
When Feodor died in 1682, her 10-year-old son became tsar. She became regent, with her foster father Artamon Matveyev who was called back from exile, as advisor.

During the revolt of the Streltsy on 15 May 1682, two of her brothers and Matveyev were killed and her biological father Kyril Naryshkin was forced to become a monk in a monastery.

Feodor's elder sister, Sofia Alekseyevna, replaced her as regent.

=== Regency of Sophia ===
With Sophia as regent for Natalya's son and her half-brother, Peter, who was co-tsar with Ivan, Natalya lived in relative poverty, receiving financial support from the Patriarch or others in the Orthodox Church. Natalya spent her time mainly in Alexis's summer palace in Preobrazhenskoe, about 5 km from Moscow, together with Peter.

=== Second Regency of Natalya ===
In August 1689, Peter overthrew Sophia, and he and his half-brother Ivan continued to be co-tsars. Natalya was reinstated as regent and leader of the regency of Peter in the court. Her brother, Lev Naryshkin, was appointed minister of foreign affairs and a de facto prime minister.

Boris Kurakin said about the second regency government of Natalya Naryshkina:

"This Princess was of good temperament and virtious, but neither dutiful nor skillful in business nor was she of a easy mind. Because of this reason she left the rule of state in the hands of her brother, the boyar Lev Naryshkin, and other ministers.... This regency of queen Natalya Kirillovna was very dishonest, and the people was discontent and insulted. During this time there begun an injust rule from the judges, and big bribes and theft from the state treasury, who continues multiplied to this day, and it is difficult to eradicate this plague".

When the Patriarch Joachim died in 1690, Peter wanted to appoint Marcellus, Bishop of Pskov, who had travelled overseas and spoke several languages, as the new patriarch. However, Natalya led the conservative faction in the court to nominate the conservative Adrian, Bishop of Kazan, to head the Russian Orthodox Church. Peter always treated his mother with great respect and deferred to her, which is evident from their preserved letters. He did not interfere in state affairs much as long as his mother was still alive.

Natalya Naryshkina died of heart failure in 1694. After her death, Peter finally took full control of the government.

== See also ==
- Naryshkin family
- Naryshkin baroque
- Victoria of Baden (descendant of Natalya)

== Notes ==
Natalya Naryshkina Naryshkin Born: 1 September 1651 Died: 4 February 1694
Russian royalty
Vacant Title last held by Maria Miloslavskaya	Tsaritsa consort of Russia; 1671–1676	Vacant Title next held by Agafiya Grushetskaya
