= Gruszecki =

Polish-Russian noble family

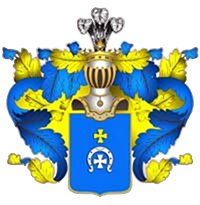
The Gruszecki Coat of Arms

Gruszecki (Lithuanian: Gruževskiai; Russian: Грушецкий, sometimes anglicized as Grushetsky) is the name of a Polish, Lithuanian, Ukrainian and Russian noble family.

== History ==
The name originates from the knight Maciej, Chorąży of the King of Poland and Lithuanian Grand Duke, Jogaila. The king had granted him the village of Gruszka Duża in eastern Poland in 1411. The Gruszecki family name was derived from the village.

Pawel (Povilas) Gruszecki had owned estates in the Łomża area in the mid-16th century. Five of his eight sons - John, Nicholas, Jacob, Andrius and Domijonas - moved to the Grand Duchy of Lithuania around 1560. Except for Jacob, who settled in Navahrudak, brothers settled and acquired estates in Dirvėnai parish, Samogitia. They became Reformed Protestants, and until the beginning of the 20th century they materially supported and defended the Protestants against persecution. Maintained relations with the Radvilas. The most famous were the descendants of John, and their most important possession was Kelmė.

== Notable members of the family ==
- Maciej Gruszecki - Chorąży of the King of Poland and Grand Duke of Lithuania Jogaila.
- Samuel Gruszecki – secretary of the King of Poland and Grand Duke of Lithuania Sigismund III Vasa, ambassador to Spain.
- Bronisław Samuel Gruszecki, sobriquet Szumilist – Wojski and Łowczy of Chernihiv, built a castle in Holoskovychi.
- Karol Gruszecki, professional basketball player

=== In Russia ===
- Agafya Grushetskaya (1663 – 1681) – Tsaritsa of Russia, the first spouse of Tsar Feodor III of Russia.
- Alexander Fedorovich Grushetskiy (born October 17, 1854 – 1911) – major-general, Governor-General of Tambov.

== Sources ==
- "Грушецкие" . Brockhaus and Efron Encyclopedic Dictionary (in Russian). 1906.
