= Agafya Grushetskaya =

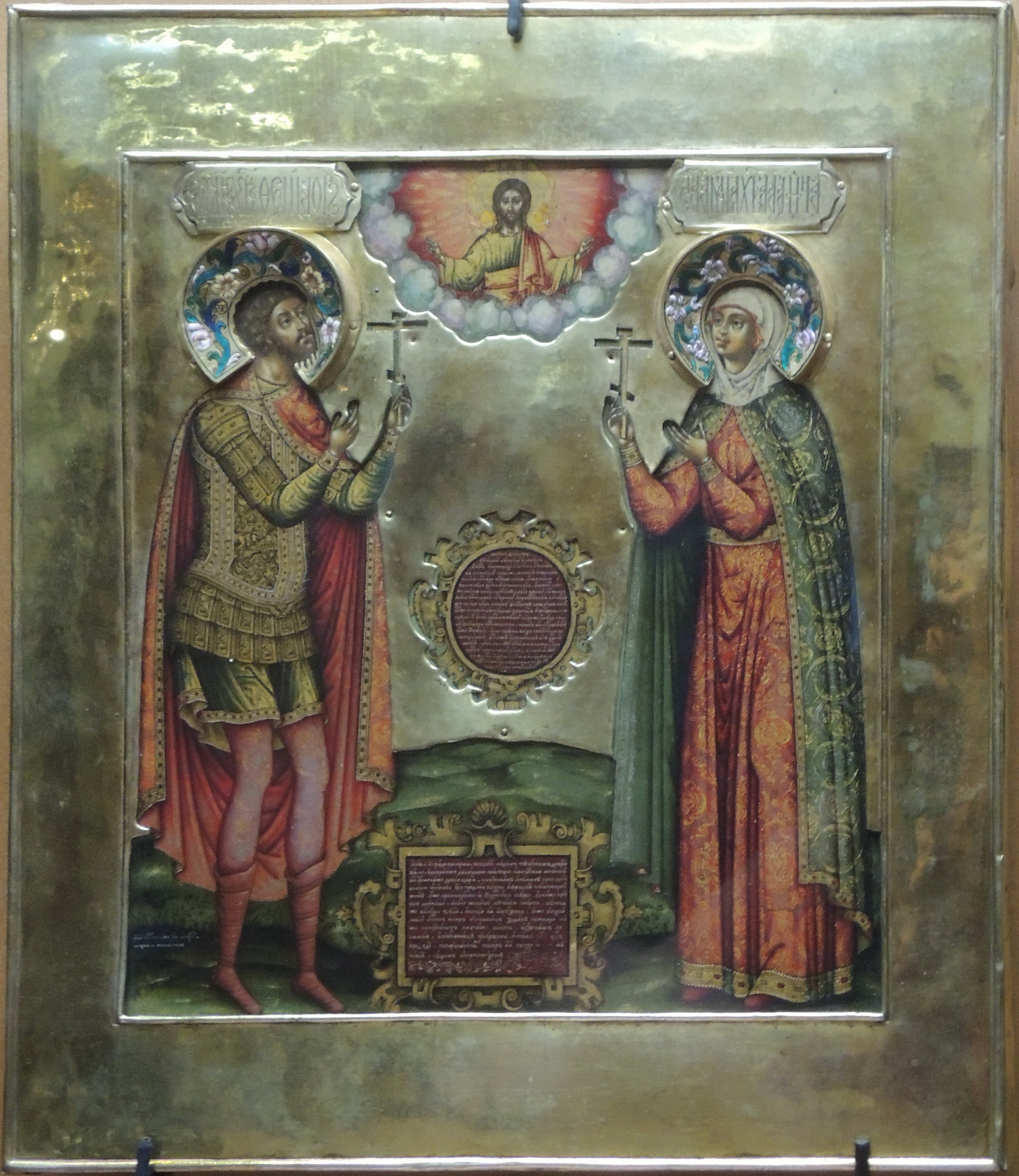

Tsaritsa consort of Russia
- Tenure: 18 July 1680 – 14 July 1681
- Predecessor: Natalya Naryshkina
- Successor: Marfa Apraksina
- Born: 1663
- Died: 14 July 1681 (aged 17–18)
- Spouse: Feodor III of Russia (m. 1680)
Names
- Agafya Semyonovna Grushetskaya; Polish: Agata Siemionowna Gruszecka; Russian: Агафья Семёновна Грушецкая
- House: Gruszecki
- Father: Semyon Fyodorovich Grushetsky
- Mother: Maria Ivanovna Zaborovska

Agafya Semyonovna Grushetskaya or Gruszecki (originally in Polish: Agata Siemionowna Gruszecka; Russian: Агафья Семёновна Грушецкая; 1663 – 14 July 1681) was Tsaritsa of Russia as the first spouse of Tsar Feodor III of Russia. She hailed from the Polish noble family Gruszecki.

== Biography ==
She was a daughter of (voivode, and boyar) Semyon Fyodorovich Grushetsky (Gruszecki) and his spouse, Maria Ivanovna Zaborovska. She could play the harpsichord, speak and write Polish, French, and Latin, and was well informed about the Western European life style; overall, she was a well-educated person. She was described as beautiful as "an angel of heaven", with an easy going character.

From 1677 she lived with her uncle, Semyon Zaborovsky, who did not wish her to marry. In 1680, Feodor, the Russian tsar at the time, saw her during a religious procession: when she fainted after the sight of a witch in a religious theater play, he rushed forward to support her, and fell in love with her. Aware that her uncle did not wish her to marry, a traditional summon was proclaimed to all unmarried noble women to gather for Feodor to choose from, and he chose her.

On 18 July 1680, she married Feodor. Agafya shared the radical views of her spouse. She opposed the influence of the Miloslavsky party, led by her husband's mother and sister, and supported Likhachev. Her husband's relative Ivan Iljitj Miloslavskii exposed her to slander, which caused a conflict, and was punished by Feodor. Her sisters were married to princes and her cousins were raised in rank by Feodor. Agafya has been described as an angelic tsarina, merciful and loyal to Feodor and the public's welfare. She was the first to advocate beard-shaving and the adoption of Western clothes at the Russian court. She herself was the first tsarina to expose her hair and to wear a Western (Polish) dress.

On 11 July 1681, the Tsarina gave birth to her son, Tsarevich Ilya Fyodorovich, the expected heir to the throne. Agafya died as a consequence of the childbirth three days later, on 14 July; and six days later, on 21 July, the nine-days-old Tsarevich also died. She was reportedly deeply mourned by Feodor.

Russian royalty
Vacant Title last held by Natalia Naryshkina	Tsaritsa consort of Russia; 1680–1681	Vacant Title next held by Marfa Apraxina
