= Kirill Naryshkin =

Kirill Poluektovich Naryshkin
- Born: 1623
- Died: 30 April 1691
- Noble family: Naryshkin family
- Spouse: Anna Lvovna Leontieva
- Father: Poluekt Ivanovich Naryshkin

Kirill Poluektovich Naryshkin (Russian: Кирилл Полуэктович Нарышкин) (1623 – April 30, 1691) was the maternal grandfather of Peter the Great.

Kirill Naryshkin’s name was first mentioned in 1646, when he and Prince Nikita Ivanovich Odoyevsky were dispatched to guard the southern borders of Muscovy against possible attacks by the Crimean Tatars. In 1654, Kirill Naryshkin participated in Alexei Mikhailovich’s military campaign against Poland and Lithuania. In 1656, he joined Prince Yuri Baryatinsky in his Orsha campaign. In 1658, Kirill Naryshkin served as head of a Streltsy unit in Smolensk. In 1660, he was sent to the Terek region as a commander to repel the attacks of the rebellious Nogais. In 1662, Kirill Naryshkin was sent to Kazan to serve as a second voyevoda of Prince M.P. Shuleshov.

The tsar’s marriage to Naryshkin’s daughter Natalia Kirillovna in 1671 greatly affected the lives of the Naryshkins. Summoned to Moscow, Kirill Naryshkin attended the wedding of his daughter and then received numerous gifts and awards. That same year, he was conferred the title of a dumniy dvoryanin (3rd rank in Boyar Duma after boyars and okolnichys), only to become an okolnichy a year later (together with Artamon Matveev) on the day tsarevich Peter was born. Around the same time, Kirill Naryshkin was granted large estates and a very substantial salary.

Again in 1671, Naryshkin (under the command of Yuri Alexeyevich Dolgorukov) participated in the pacifying of the Nizhny Novgorod region after the Razin rebellion. After his raise to the rank of a boyar on November 27, 1672, Kirill Naryshkin never really played any significant role at the royal court or in political life of the Tsardom of Russia, only occasionally overseeing Moscow during the tsar’s pilgrimages to different monasteries or trips to the surrounding countryside. Naryshkin, however, held the post of a chief magistrate at the Grand Palace Prikaz (Приказ большого дворца).

During the reign of Feodor III of Russia, Kirill Naryshkin seems to have stopped taking part in the life of the royal court (possibly, due to the intrigues of the Miloslavskys), because we do not see him among guests at formal dinners or receptions of foreign ambassadors. He attended, however, the Sobor of 1682, convocated for the purpose of abolishing the mestnichestvo, and was among the ones who signed its final resolution (соборное деяние). During the Streltsy Uprising of 1682, Kirill Naryshkin had to suffer through several personal tragedies. His sons were killed during the rebellion and then he himself was forced by the Streltsy to take monastic vows under the name of Kiprian (Cyprian) and banished to Kirillo-Belozersky Monastery.

Upon the enthronement of his grandson Peter I, Kirill Naryshkin could have returned to the royal court, but chose to remain within the monastery walls due to his venerable age. He died at the monastery on April 30, 1691. His wife – Anna Leontyevna Naryshkina – died on July 2, 1706, and was interred at Vysokopetrovsky Monastery.
