= Marfa Apraksina =

Tsarina of Russia (1664–1716)

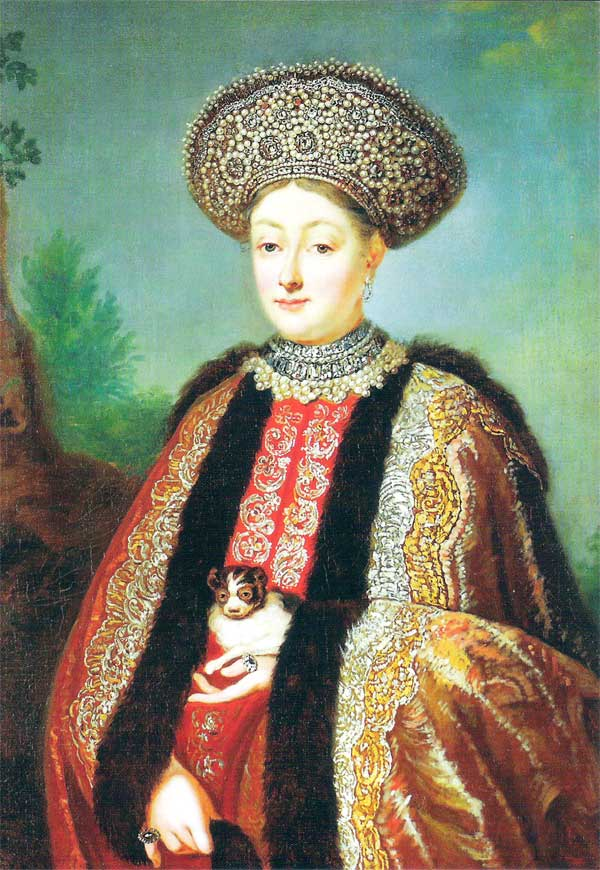
- Portrait of Marfa Apraksina, by an unknown painter.

Tsarina of Russia
- Tenure: 14 February 1682 – 7 May 1682
- Predecessor: Agafya Grushetskaya
- Successor: Praskovia Saltykova
- Born: 1664
- Died: 1716 (aged 51–52)
- Burial: 7 January 1716; Peter and Paul Cathedral
- Spouse: Feodor III of Russia (m. 1682; died 1682)
Names
- Marfa Matveyevna Apraksina; Russian: Марфа Матвеевна Апраксина
- House: Romanov
- Father: Matvey Vasilyevich Apraksin
- Mother: Domna Bogdanovna Lovchikova

Marfa Matveyevna Apraksina (Russian: Ма́рфа Матве́евна Апра́ксина; 1664–1716) was a Tsarina of Russia and the second spouse of Tsar Feodor III of Russia.

== Life ==
She was the daughter of the pantler Matvey Vasilyevich Apraksin and Domna Bogdanovna Apraksina, née Lovchikova. Marfa Matveyevna had three brothers, Peter, Fyodor and Andrey, who all became leading statesmen.

Her marriage to the widowed Tsar was arranged by his friend, Ivan Yazykov, who hoped to strengthen his position at court. Marfa Matveyevna was approved as a bride by Metropolitan Hilarion, himself close to the Apraksin family. She received the status of royal bride in December 1681. The wedding of seventeen-year-old Marfa Matveyevna to the twenty-year-old Tsar took place on 15 February 1682 (O.S.; 25 February N.S.).

Marfa Matveyevna was tsarina for only 71 days, from her wedding day to 27 April 1682 (O.S.; 7 May), when the Tsar died of scurvy. Marfa Matveyevna, being childless, still a virgin according to some assumptions, remained in mourning for more than thirty years. She first lived in Moscow, then in Saint Petersburg in her own palace, at the corner of Admiralty Square and Nevskaya Prospect, near the mansion of her brother, Admiral General Fyodor Matveyevich Apraksin. Today, the Winter Palace is located there.

By her skillful behavior, she created a strong position for herself at court. She retained the trust and respect of her husband's younger brother, Peter the Great, and the whole royal family, and received an allowance from the treasury until the end of her life, without participating in political intrigues.

In December 1715, Marfa Matveyevna visited the sick Tsar, but suddenly became ill herself. On 25, 28 and 30 December, the Tsar visited her, and she died on 31 December. According to Friedrich Christian Weber, the cause of the queen's death was poisoning from pickled mushrooms. The Tsar personally attended the autopsy, as, according to Pyotr Dolgorukov, he 'wanted to know the truth about [her] short marriage'. Peter 'did not stop before examining the corpse: only having convinced himself of the virginity of his deceased sister-in-law with his own eyes, he handed over to [her brother] the enormous riches bequeathed to [him] for life'.

The Tsarina's funeral took place on 7 January 1716 in the Peter and Paul Cathedral in Saint Petersburg, as the fourth burial there. Marfa Matveyevna was a devout woman, observing the old rituals. She was the last member of the Romanov family whose funeral and burial were according to the ancient traditions, prohibited by Peter afterwards in the whole country.

== Sources ==
- "Марфа Матвеевна" . Brockhaus and Efron Encyclopedic Dictionary (in Russian). 1906.
- Grigoryan VG Romanov. Biographical Directory. - Moscow: AST, 2007.

Russian royalty
Vacant Title last held by Agafya Grushetskaya	Tsaritsa consort of Russia; 1682	Vacant Title next held by Praskovia Saltykova
