= Coronation of the Russian monarch =

Formal investiture and crowning ceremony

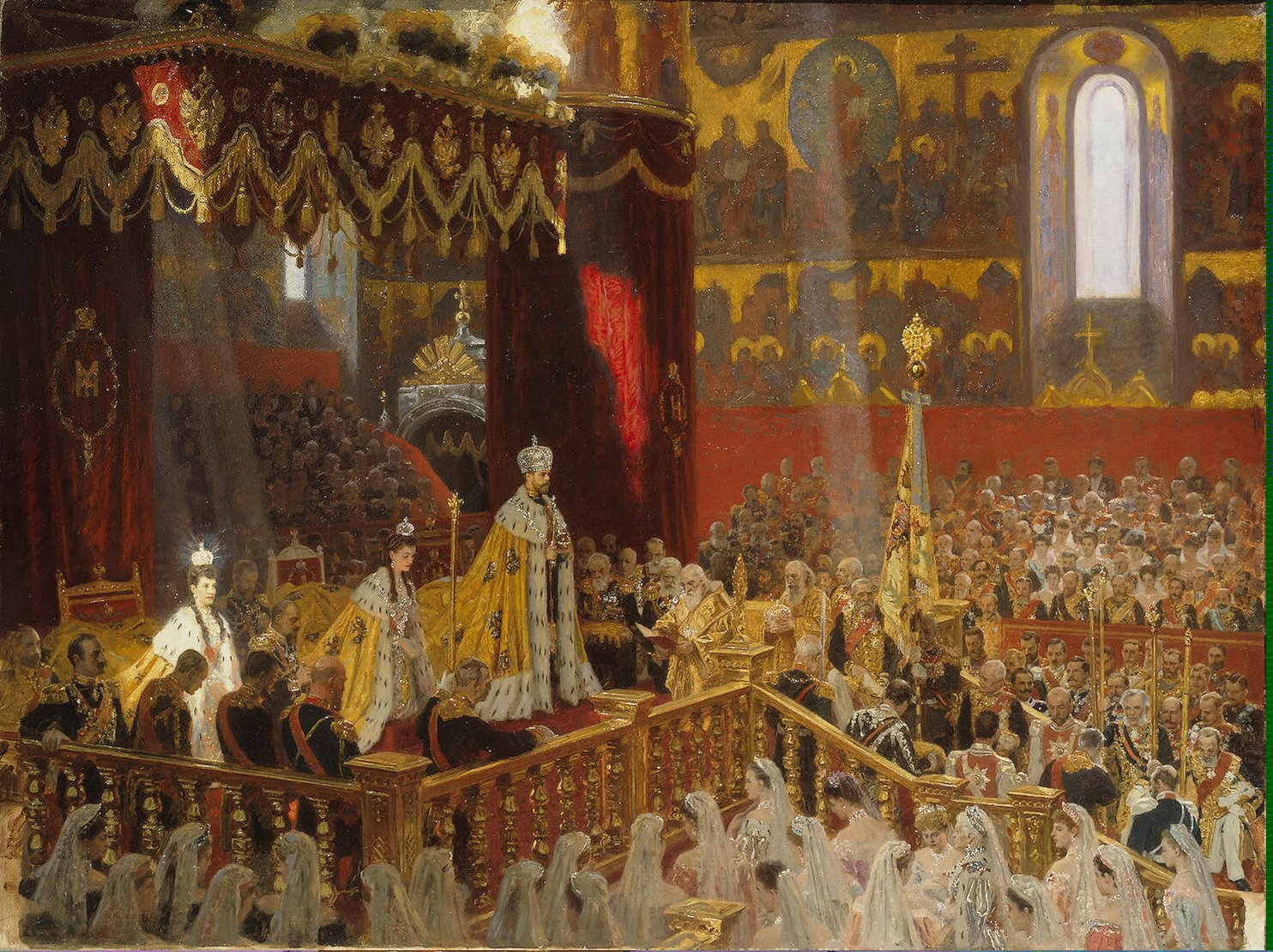
Coronation of Tsar Nicholas II and Empress Alexandra Feodorovna in 1896. Nicholas' mother, Dowager Empress Maria Feodorovna can also be seen seated on the dais at left.

The coronation of the emperor of Russia (generally referred to as the Tsar) from 1547 to 1917, was a highly developed religious ceremony in which he was crowned and invested with regalia, then anointed with chrism and formally blessed by the church to commence his reign. Although rulers of Muscovy had been crowned prior to the reign of Ivan III, their coronation rituals assumed overt Byzantine overtones as the result of the influence of Ivan's wife Sophia Paleologue, and the imperial ambitions of his grandson, Ivan the Terrible. The modern coronation, introducing "Western European-style" elements, replaced the previous "crowning" ceremony and was first used for Catherine I in 1724. Since tsarist Russia claimed to be the "Third Rome" and the replacement of Byzantium as the true Christian state, the Russian rite was designed to link its rulers and prerogatives to those of the so-called "Second Rome" (Constantinople).

While months or even years could pass between the initial accession of the sovereign and the performance of this ritual, church policy held that the monarch must be anointed and crowned according to the Orthodox rite to have a successful tenure. As the church and state were essentially one in Imperial Russia, this service invested the Tsars with political legitimacy; however, this was not its only intent. It was equally perceived as conferring a genuine spiritual benefit that mystically wedded sovereign to subjects, bestowing divine authority upon the new ruler. As such, it was similar in purpose to other European coronation ceremonies from the medieval era.

Even when the imperial capital was located at St. Petersburg (1713–1728, 1732–1917), Russian coronations were always held in Moscow at the Cathedral of the Dormition in the Kremlin. The last coronation service in Russia was held on 26 May 1896 for Nicholas II and his wife Alexandra Feodorovna, who would be the final Tsar and Tsaritsa of Russia. The Russian Imperial regalia survived the subsequent Russian Revolution and the Communist period, and are currently on exhibit in a museum at the Kremlin Armoury.

Starting with the reign of Ivan IV, the ruler of Russia was known as "Tsar" rather than "Grand Prince"; "Tsar" being a Slavonic equivalent to the Latin term "Caesar". This continued until 1721, during the reign of Peter I, when the title was formally changed to Imperator (Emperor). Peter's decision reflected the difficulties other European monarchs had in deciding whether to recognize the Russian ruler as an emperor or a mere king, and reflected his insistence on being seen as the former. However, the term "Tsar" remained the popular title for the Russian ruler despite the formal change of style, thus this article utilizes that term, rather than "Emperor".

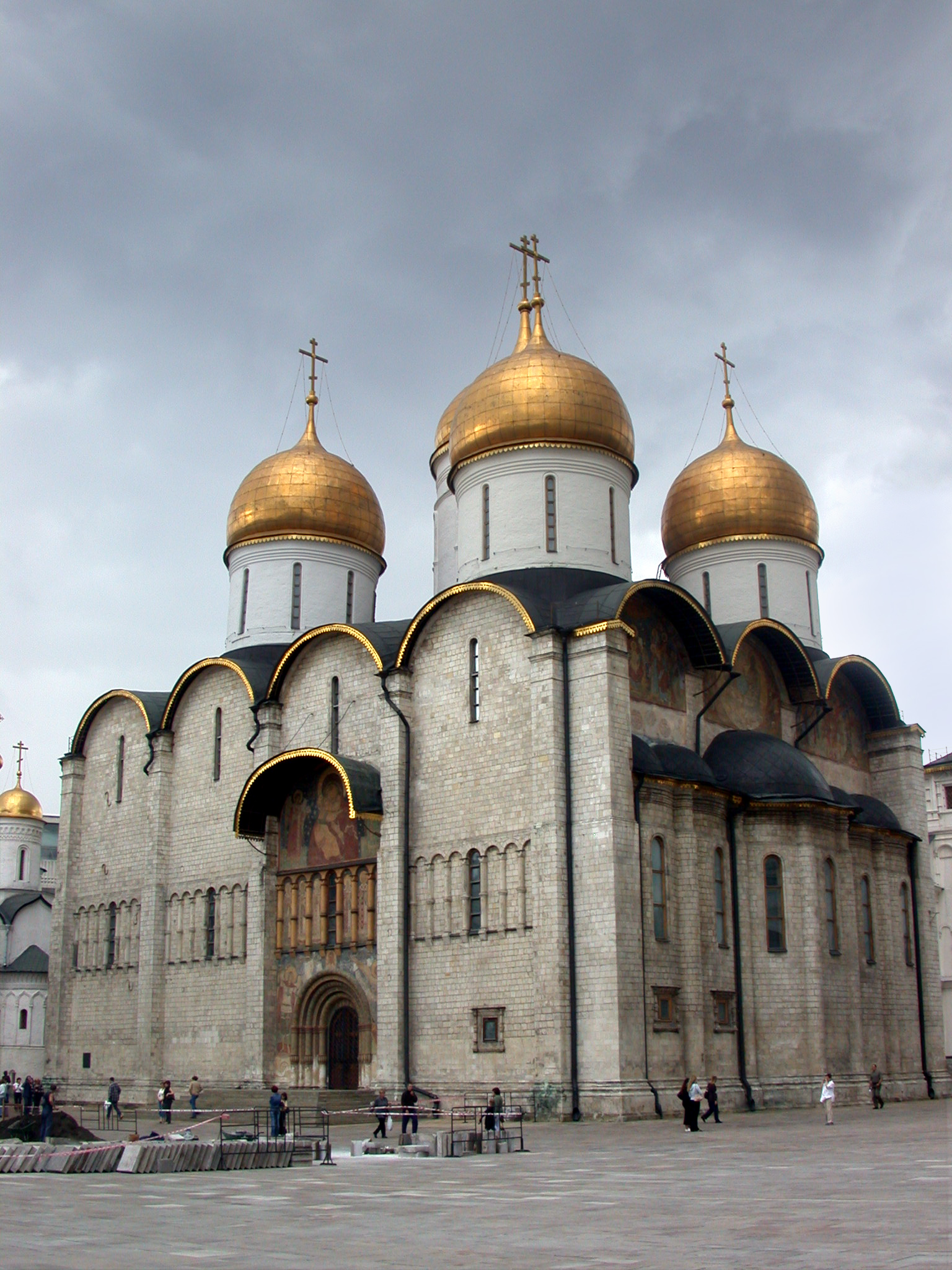
The Cathedral of the Dormition, where Russian coronations were held.

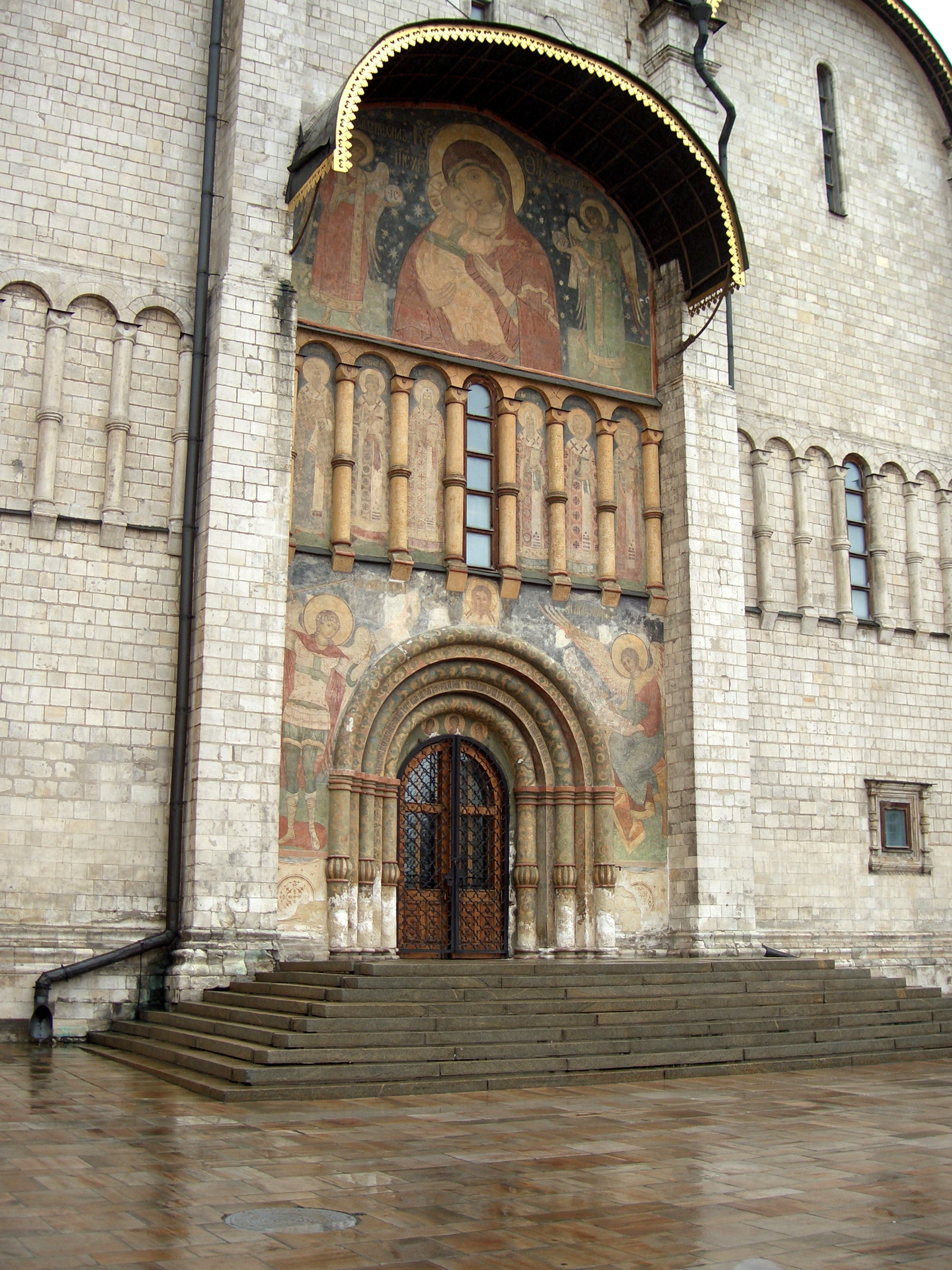
Entry doors to Dormition Cathedral, Moscow Kremlin.

== Symbolism ==
In medieval Europe, the anointed Christian ruler was viewed as a mixta persona, part priest and part layman, but never wholly either. The Russian Orthodox Church considered the Tsar to be "wedded" to his subjects in the Orthodox coronation service.

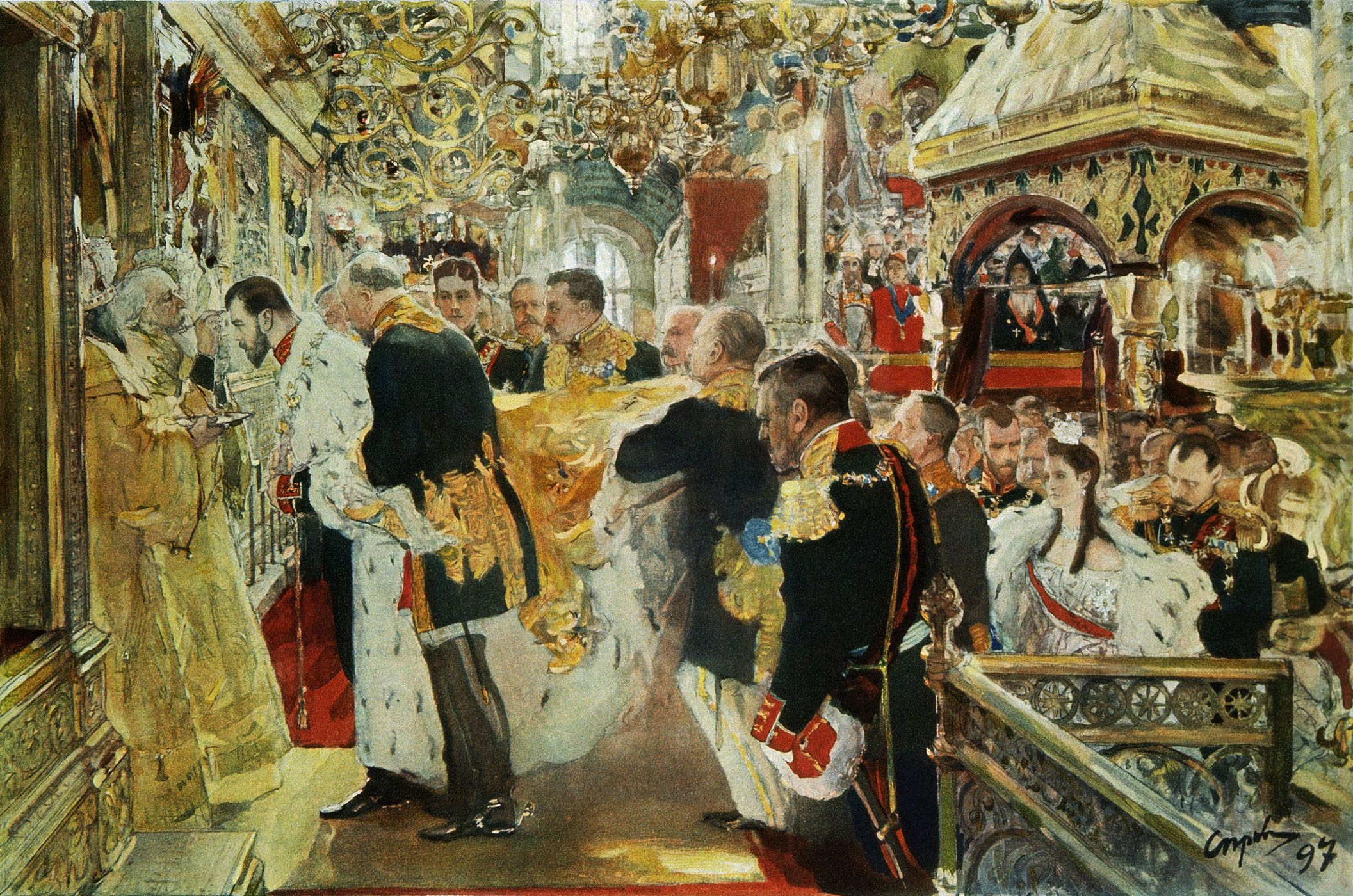
Anointing of Tsar Nicholas II of Russia during his coronation in 1896

The Orthodox concept on this subject was explained by Russian bishop Nektarios (Kontzevich), a prelate of the Russian Orthodox Church Abroad:

The Tsar was and is anointed by God. This mystery is performed by the Church during the coronation, and the Anointed of God enters the Royal Doors into the altar, goes to the altar table and receives the Holy Mysteries as does the priest, with the Body and Blood taken separately. Thus the Holy Church emphasises the great spiritual significance of the podvig (struggle) of ruling as a monarch, equalling this to the holy sacrament of the priesthood ... He (the Tsar) is the sacramental image, the carrier of the special power of the Grace of the Holy Spirit."

Since no Orthodox layperson, regardless of societal or political rank, was ever permitted to pass through the Royal Doors or partake of communion in both kinds separately, the permission given to the Tsar to do both during his coronation ritual was intended to demonstrate both the solemn nature of the ritual, and the spiritual duties and authority devolving upon the new monarch. Sacred and secular, church and state, God and government were all welded together by the coronation service in the person of the anointed Tsar—or so many Russians believed.

Since the newly ascended sovereign was permitted all the privileges of rule immediately upon his accession, coronations were not necessarily held right away. Instead, one or more years might be permitted to elapse between the initial accession of a Tsar and the ceremony itself. This allowed the court to finish its mourning for the new sovereign's predecessor, and permitted completion of the immense arrangements involved in staging the ritual.

== Imperial regalia ==
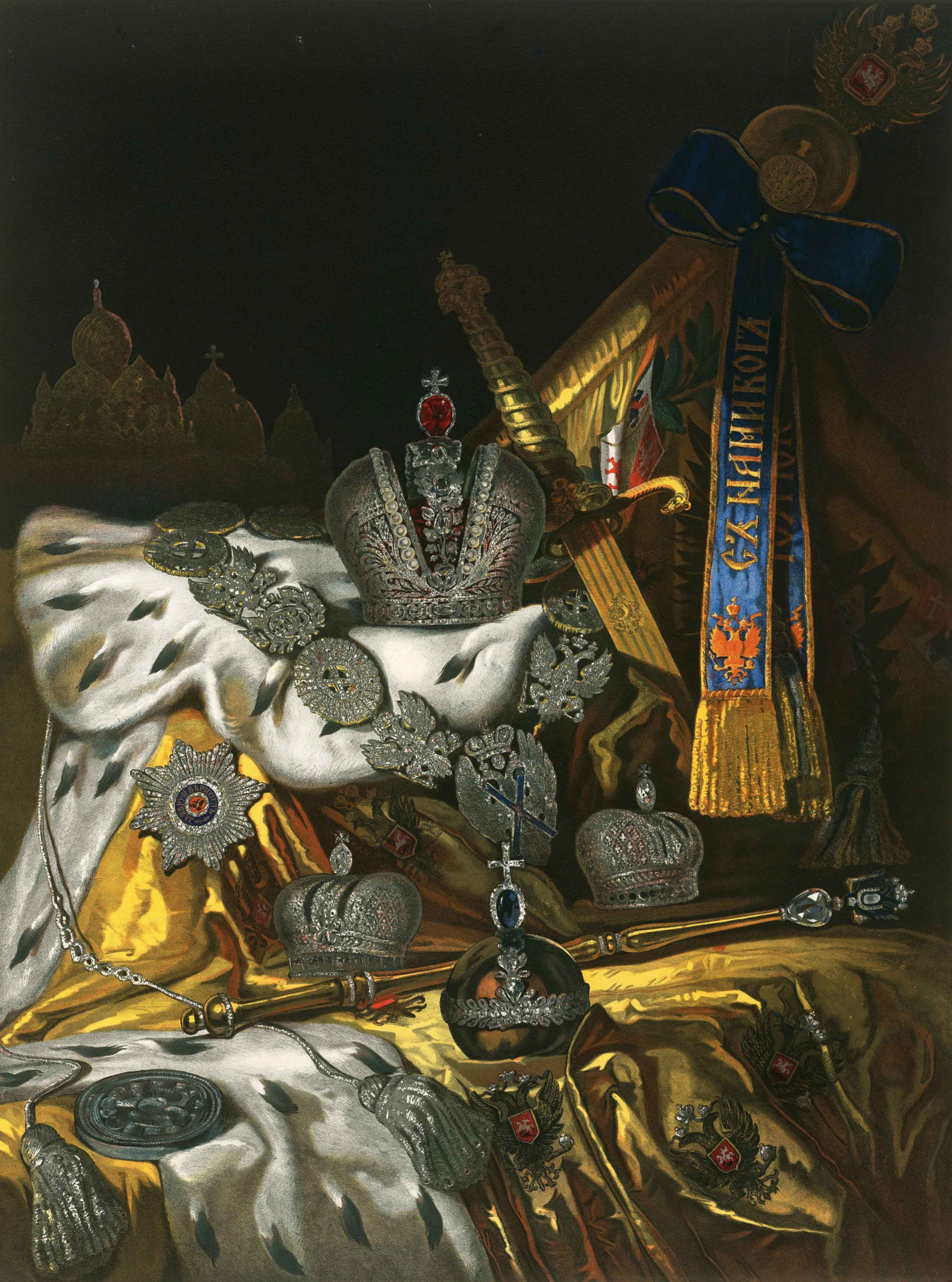
Russian Regalia

As in most European monarchies, the Tsars of Russia retained a sizable collection of Imperial regalia, some of which was used in their coronation ceremonies. The most important items included:

=== The sovereign's crown ===
Russian rulers from Dmitri Donskoi to Peter the Great utilized the Cap of Monomakh, a fourteenth-century gold filigree cap with sable trimming, adorned with pearls and other gemstones. Although Russian legend held that it had been given to Vladimir Monomakh by the Byzantine emperor Constantine IX, more modern scholarship assigns an Asian origin to this diadem.

With the accession of Peter the Great as Emperor of Russia in 1721, he undertook a programme of "westernizing" various aspects of Russian society. In line with this, the regalia also became influenced by Western-style. He replaced Monomakh's diadem with one modelled on the private crowns of the Holy Roman emperors, of which the Imperial Crown of Austria is one example. Peter's wife, who succeeded him as Catherine I, was the first to wear this type of diadem. For the coronation of Catherine the Great (Catherine II) in 1762, court jewelers Ekhart and Jérémie Pauzié decided to create a new crown, known as the Great Imperial Crown, which used the style of a mitre divided into two half-spheres with a central arch between them topped by diamonds and a 398.72-carat red spinel from China. The crown was produced in a record two months and weighted only 2.3 kg. This crown was used in all coronations from Paul I to Nicholas II—although the latter tried (but failed) to replace it with Monomakh's Crown for his ceremony. It survived the subsequent revolution, and is considered to be one of the main treasures of the Romanov dynasty, now on display in the Kremlin Armoury Museum in Moscow.

=== The consort's crown ===
A smaller crown, virtually identical in appearance and workmanship to the Great Imperial Crown, was manufactured for the crowning of the Tsar's consort. It was encrusted with diamonds, and first used for Tsaritsa Maria Feodorovna, wife of Paul I, being last used at the coronation of Nicholas II by Dowager Empress Maria Feodorovna. An identical new consort crown was made for Alexandra Feodorovna. The reason for this was that an already-crowned dowager empress outranked a new empress consort at the Russian court. The consort crown was often referred to as the "Smaller Imperial Crown", to differentiate it from the Tsar's Great Imperial Crown.

=== Sceptre and orb ===
The Imperial sceptre was manufactured during the reign of Catherine the Great, and comprised "a burnished shaft of three sections containing eight rings of brilliant-cut diamonds", topped by the Orlov Diamond which was itself surmounted by a double-headed eagle with the coat of arms of Russia at its center.

The orb was manufactured in 1762 for Catherine II's coronation, and consisted of a polished hollow ball made from red gold encircled by two rows of diamonds and surmounted by a large sapphire topped by a cross.

=== The banner of state ===
Each Tsar had a Banner of State manufactured for his coronation and reign. This banner was blessed on the eve of the coronation, in the Kremlin Armoury, and was present at his crowning the next day, as well as at significant events during his reign thereafter.

== The coronation ==
=== Entry into Moscow ===
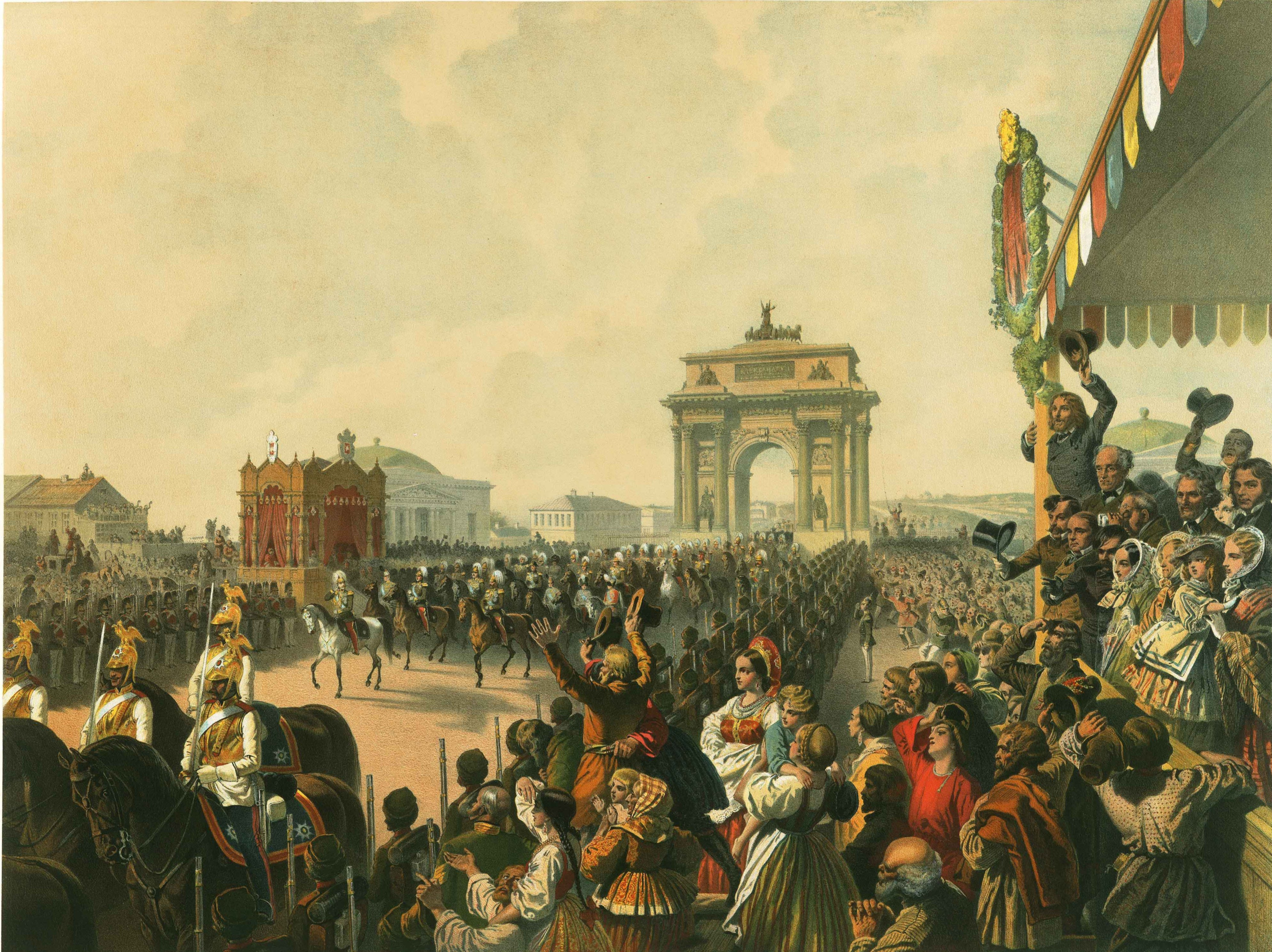
Entry of Tsar Alexander II and his entourage into Moscow for his coronation, 1856

Russian coronations took place in Moscow, the country's ancient capital. The new ruler made a great processional entrance on horseback into the city, accompanied by multiple cavalry squadrons, his consort (in an accompanying carriage) and the pealing of literally thousands of church bells. The new Tsar stopped at the Chapel of Our Lady of Iveron, home of the Icon of the Blessed Virgin of Iveron, one of the most revered icons in Moscow. It was a tradition with Russian Tsars that every entry to the Kremlin be marked by the veneration of this image.

Following his entry into the city the new Tsar and his entourage took time to rest and prepare for the following day's ceremony, while heralds in medieval clothing read out special proclamations to "the good people of Our first capital". Receptions were held for foreign diplomats, the Banner of State was consecrated, and the imperial regalia were brought from the Kremlin Armoury to the throne hall for the procession to the cathedral. In conjunction with the Tsar's entry into Moscow, fines were remitted, prisoners pardoned, and a three-day holiday was proclaimed.

=== Coronation procession ===
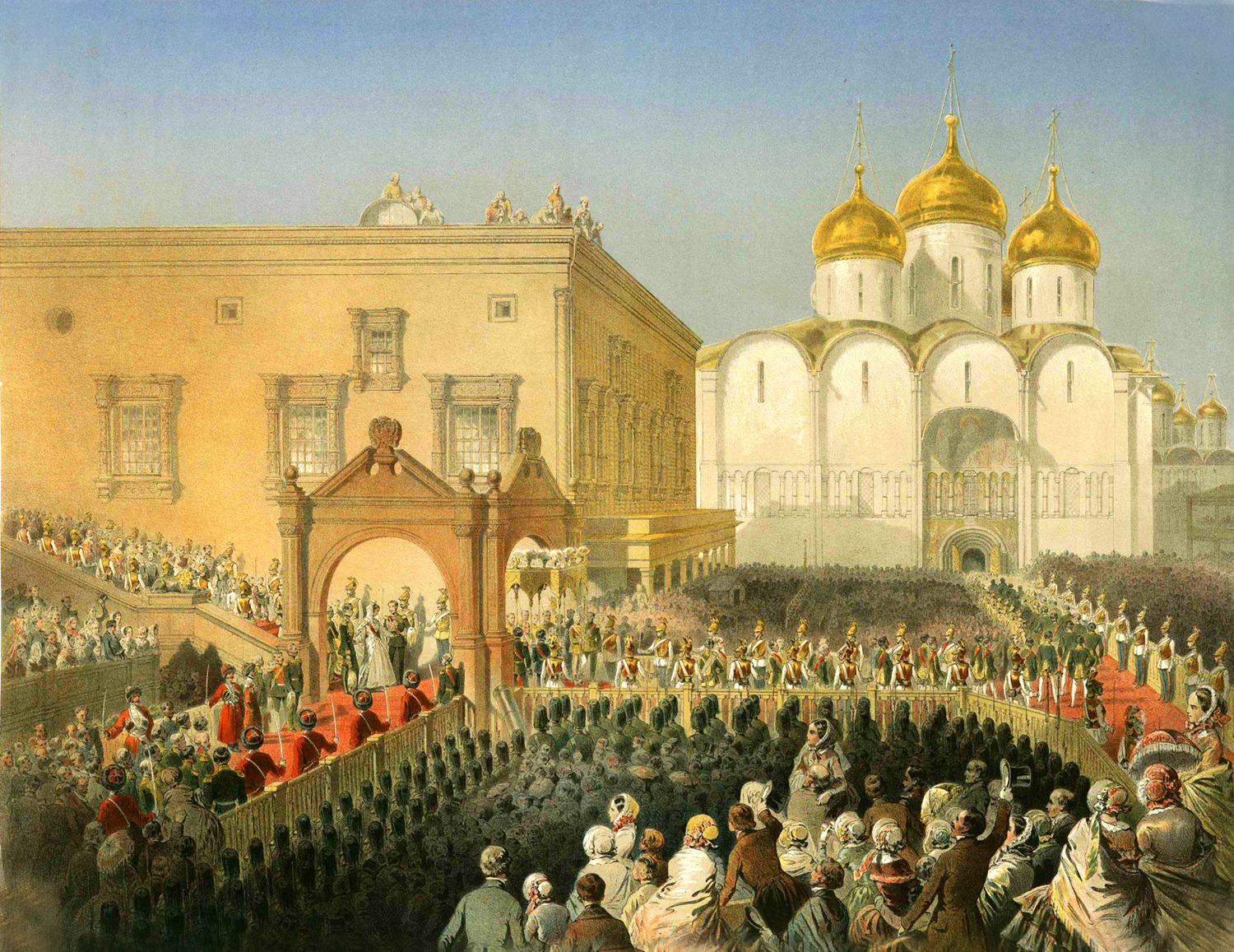
Procession of Tsar Alexander II into Dormition Cathedral from the Red Porch during his coronation in 1856.

The Tsar was met on the morning of his coronation at the Kremlin Palace's Red Porch, where he took his place beneath a large canopy held by thirty-two Russian generals, with other officers providing additional support. Accompanied by his wife (under a separate canopy) and the regalia, he proceeded slowly toward the Cathedral of the Dormition, where his anointing and crowning would take place. Among the items of regalia in the parade were the Chain of the Order of St. Andrew the First-Called for the Tsaritsa, the Sword of State, the Banner of State, the State Seal, the Purple Robe for the Tsar, the Orb, the Sceptre, the Small Imperial Crown and the Great Imperial Crown, all arranged in a strict order. Aides-de-camp to the Tsar, generals of the Suite and the Horse Guards troop lined up along the route, from the Red Porch to the cathedral. The Hof-Marshal, the Hof-Marshal in Chief and the Supreme Marshal, each with a mace in his hand, silently joined the procession, which also boasted the Ministers of the War Office and Imperial Court, the Commander of the Imperial Residence, the Adjutant General of the Day, the orderly Major General of the Suite and the Commander of the Horse Guards regiment, among others.

The Tsar and his wife were met at the cathedral door by the Orthodox prelates, chief among them either the Patriarch of Russia or (during times when there was no Patriarch) the Metropolitan Bishop of Moscow. The presiding bishop offered the Cross to the monarchs for kissing, while another hierarch sprinkled them with holy water. Once they had entered the cathedral, they venerated the icons there three times, then took their places on the cathedral dais, where two large thrones had been set up. One of these was the throne of Tsar Michael I, first Tsar of the Romanov dynasty, who ascended the throne in 1613; the other was that of Ivan III, who created the title of "Tsar of all the Russias" in the fifteenth century. Protocol prohibited any crowned sovereign from witnessing the coronation. However, in 1896, exceptions were made for Tsar Nicholas II's mother, Maria Feodorovna, and Nicholas' aunt-by-marriage, Queen Olga of Greece, a Romanov grand duchess by birth and consort of Nicholas' maternal uncle, King George I.

=== The ceremony begins ===
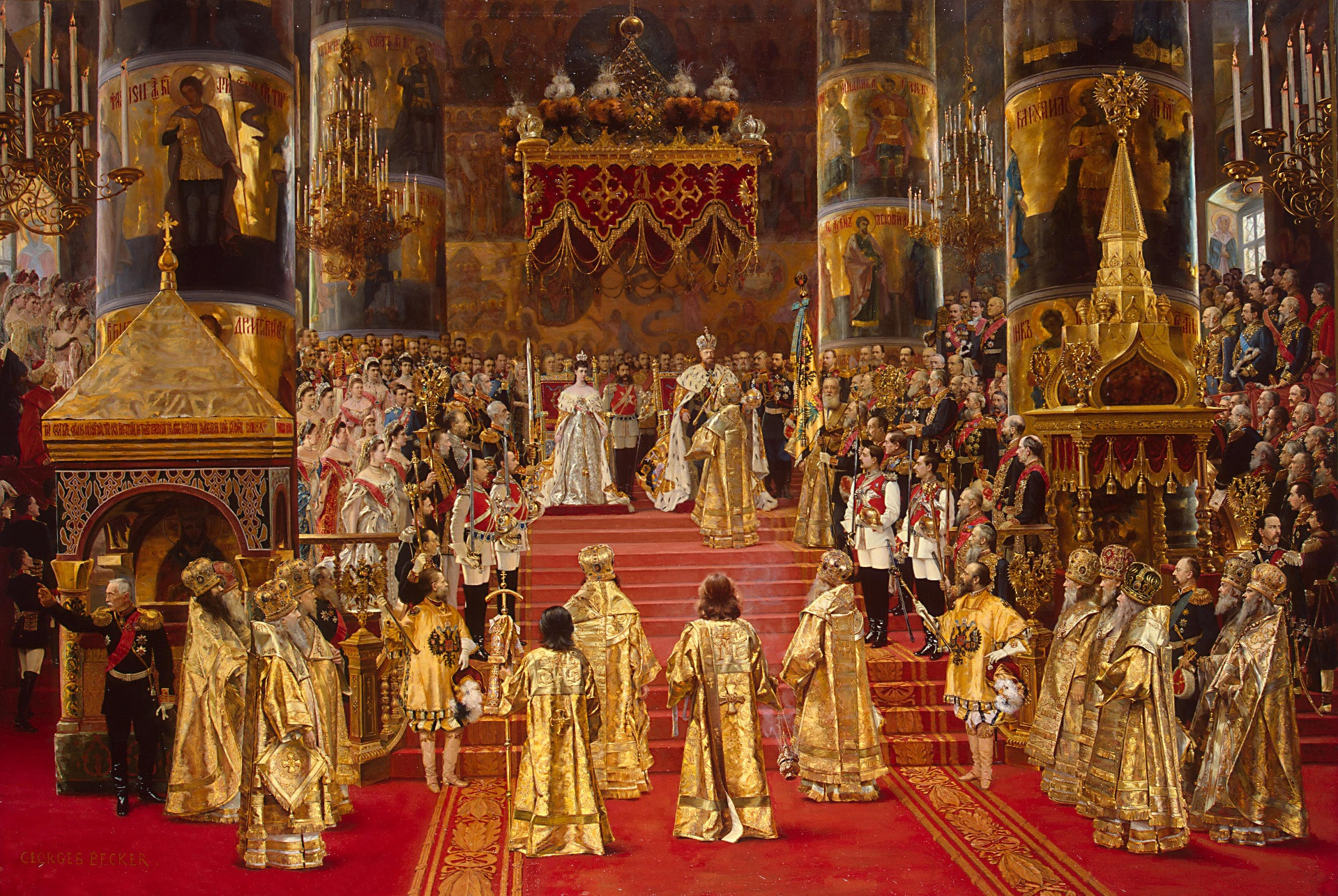
Alexander III receiving the sceptre during his coronation in 1883

The ceremony itself commenced with the singing of Psalm 101, as the Tsar was invited to recite the Niceno-Constantinopolitan Creed according to the Eastern Orthodox usage, without the Filioque clause. Then the Tsar was given a book containing a prayer for him to read, following which the prelate pronounced a blessing upon him. Further hymns were sung, and three scripture lessons were read: Isaiah 49:13–19, Romans 13:1–7 and Matthew 22:15–22.

The Tsar now removed the chain of the Order of St. Andrew, and was robed in Purple by the Metropolitans of St. Petersburg and Kiev. Bowing his head, he now had hands laid upon him by the chief celebrant, who read two prayers over him. These two prayers originated in, and were identical with, those found in the Byzantine coronation ritual. In the first of these prayers the presiding Metropolitan prayed:

O Lord our God, King of kings and Lord of lords, who through Samuel the prophet didst choose Thy servant David and didst anoint him to be king over Thy people Israel; hear now the supplication of us though unworthy, and look forth from Thy holy dwelling place and vouchsafe to anoint with the oil of gladness Thy faithful servant N., whom Thou hast been pleased to establish as king over Thy holy people which Thou hast made Thine own by the precious blood of Thine Only-begotten Son. Clothe him with power from on high; set on his head a crown of precious stones; bestow on him length of days, set in his right hand a scepter of salvation; establish him upon the throne of righteousness; defend him with the panoply of thy Holy Spirit; strengthen his arm; subject to him all the barbarous nations; sow in his heart the fear of Thee and feeling for his subjects; preserve him in the blameless faith; make him manifest as the sure guardian of the doctrines of Thy Holy Catholic Church; that he may judge Thy people in righteousness and Thy poor in judgment, and save the sons of those in want and may be an heir of Thy heavenly kingdom. [Aloud] For Thine is the might and Thine is the kingdom and the power, of the Father, and of the Son, and of the Holy Spirit, now and ever, and unto the ages of ages. Amen.

After the greeting of "Peace be with you" by the Metropolitan came the deacon's command: "Bow your heads unto the Lord". The Metropolitan now read the second prayer, as all inclined their heads:

To Thee alone, King of mankind, has he to whom Thou hast entrusted the earthly kingdom bowed his neck with us. And we pray Thee, Lord of all, keep him under Thine own shadow; strengthen his kingdom; grant that he may do continually those things which are pleasing to Thee; make to arise in his days righteousness and abundance of peace; that in his tranquility we may lead a tranquil and quiet life in all godliness and gravity. For Thou art the King of peace and the Saviour of our souls and bodies and to Thee we ascribe glory: to the Father and to the Son, and to the Holy Spirit, now and ever, and unto the ages of ages. Amen.

=== Crowning of the Tsar ===
Drawing of the Imperial Crown of Russia

Following this the new ruler directed the Metropolitan to hand him the Imperial Crown. The Tsar took the crown from the Metropolitan's hands and placed it upon his own head, as the prelate invoked the name of the Holy Trinity. This was in keeping with the custom inherited from the Byzantine Emperors, and was intended to indicate that the imperial power, which the Tsars viewed as the direct continuation of the Christian Roman Empire (Byzantium), came directly from God. The prayer of the Metropolitan or Patriarch, similar to that of the Patriarch of Constantinople for the Byzantine Emperor, confirmed the imperial supremacy:

Most God-fearing, absolute, and mighty Lord, Tsar of all the Russias, this visible and tangible adornment of thy head is an eloquent symbol that thou, as the head of the whole Russian people, art invisibly crowned by the King of kings, Christ, with a most ample blessing, seeing that He bestows upon thee entire authority over His people.

Next the Tsar received his sceptre and orb, given to him by the Metropolitan, who again invoked the Christian Trinity and then recited these words:

God-crowned, God-given, God-adorned, most pious Autocrat and great Sovereign, Emperor of All the Russias. Receive the sceptre and the orb, which are the visible signs of the autocratic power given thee from the Most High over thy people, that thou mayest rule them and order for them the welfare they desire.

=== Crowning of the Tsaritsa-consort ===
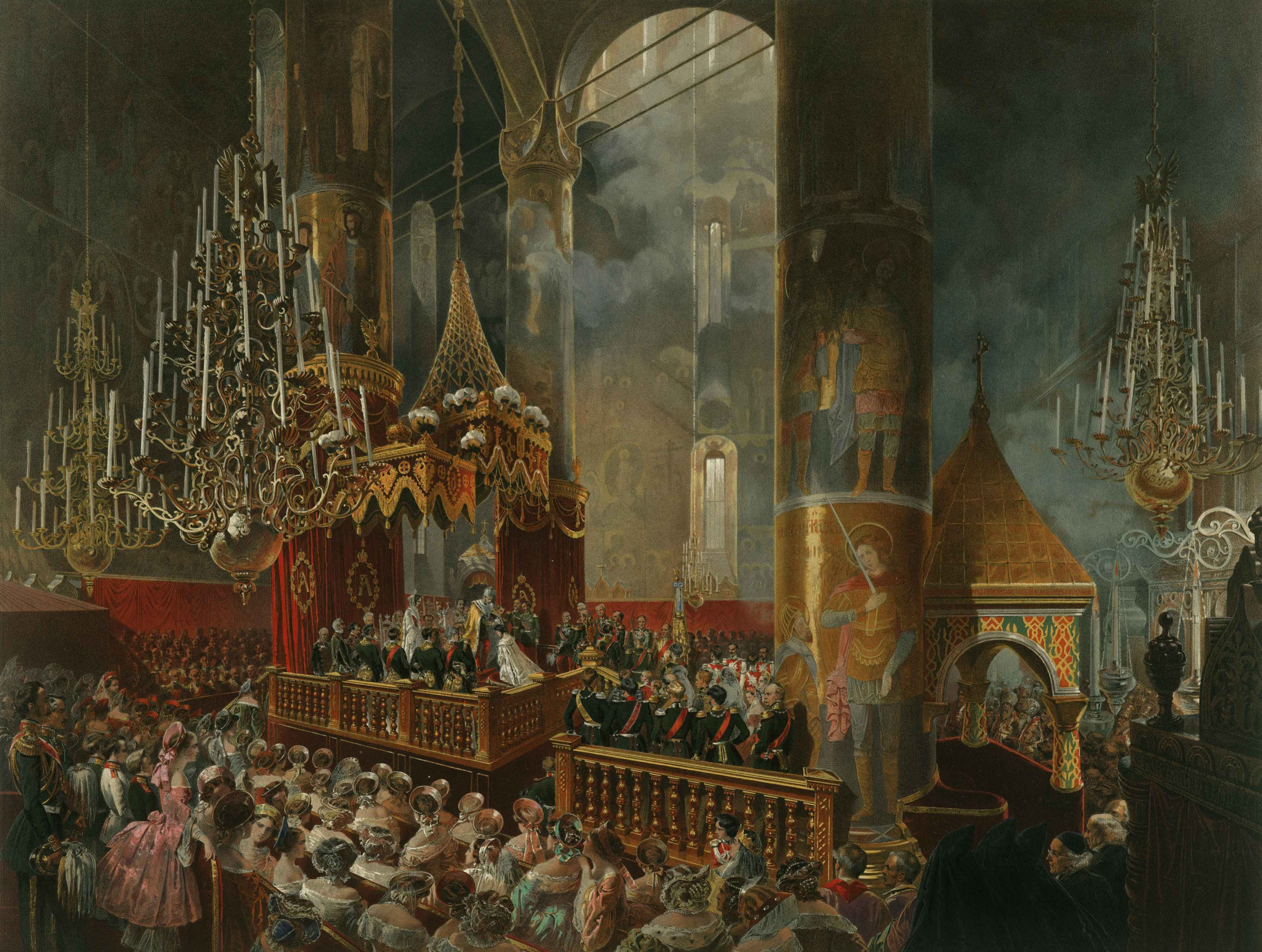
Crowning of Tsaritsa Maria Alexandrovna.

Once the Tsar had received the crown, sceptre and orb, he seated himself upon his throne holding the orb in his left hand, and the sceptre in his right. Summoning an aide, he divested himself of the sceptre and orb as his wife knelt upon a crimson cushion before him. Taking off his crown, the Tsar placed it briefly upon her head before returning it to his own. The Tsar next placed the Tsaritsa's crown upon his consort's head and the chain of the Order of St. Andrew around her neck, accompanied by a purple mantle, signifying her sharing in his dignity and responsibility for the nation's welfare.

According to Baroness Sophie Buxhoeveden, lady-in-waiting and friend of the last Tsaritsa, Alexandra Feodorovna, the Tsaritsa saw her role in her husband's coronation as "a kind of mystic marriage to Russia. She became one with Russia, sealed forever a Russian in heart and soul, and so she remained from that day and all her life. The long Divine Liturgy, the robing of the Emperor, his investiture with the Imperial insignia, she saw as in a dream." According to Buxhoeveden, Alexandra never tired at all throughout the five-hour ritual, insisting that everything was "beautiful".

Prior to Maria Fedorovna's crowning in 1797, only two other Russian consorts had ever been crowned: Marina Mniszech, wife of Tsar Dmitri I the False, who was crowned in 1606; and Catherine, wife of Peter I, who reigned over Russia in her own right following Peter's death. The Russian Orthodox Church had generally opposed the crowning of women prior to Peter's reign, and his decision to introduce this innovation reflected his desire to break with previous tradition and bring Russia more into line with other Western monarchies. The church incorporated these developments into its coronation ritual, retaining them through the final ceremony in 1896. At the coronation of Alexander II, Empress Marie Alexandrovna's crown slipped from her head, which was taken as a bad-omen.

=== The "many years" and the anointing ===
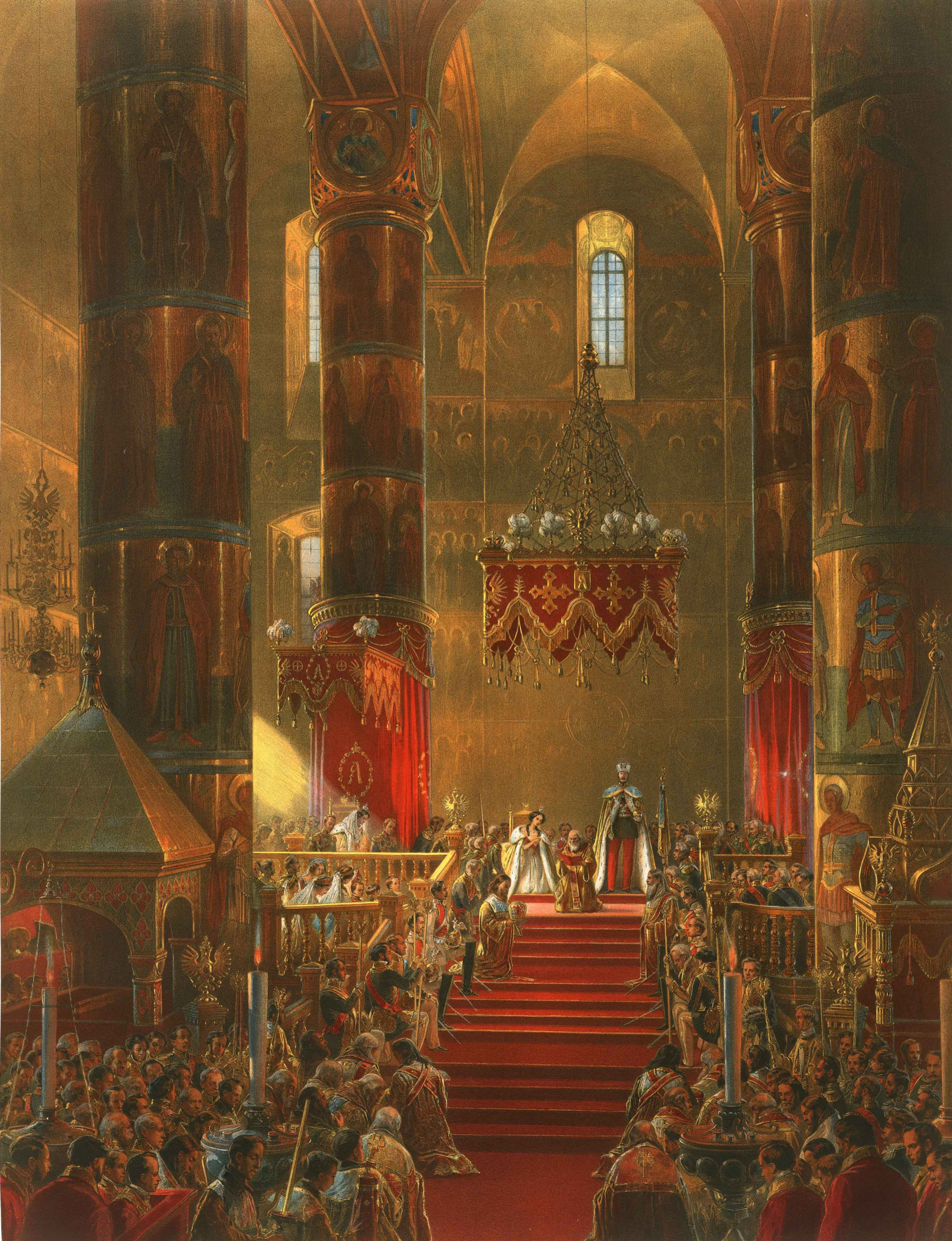
The Metropolitan reads the prayer for Alexander II.

After the crowning of his consort, the newly crowned Tsar retrieved his orb and sceptre, while the cathedral choir intoned the Orthodox prayer for "many years" of health and a long, prosperous reign for both Tsar and Tsaritsa. This was accompanied by the ringing of bells and a 101-gun salute outside the cathedral. Kneeling, the Tsar again handed his orb and sceptre to his attendant, then recited a prayer. Following this, he rose to his feet, while the presiding bishop and all others present knelt to pray for him on behalf of all the Russian people while the choir sang: "We praise Thee, O God".

The text of the Tsar's prayer read as follows:

Lord God of our fathers, and King of Kings, Who created all things by Thy word, and by Thy wisdom has made man, that he should walk uprightly and rule righteously over Thy world; Thou hast chosen me as Tsar and judge over Thy people. I acknowledge Thy unsearchable purpose towards me, and bow in thankfulness before Thy Majesty. Do Thou, my Lord and Governor, fit me for the work to which Thou hast sent me; teach me and guide me in this great service. May there be with me the wisdom which belongs to Thy throne; send it from Thy Holy Heaven, that I may know what is well-pleasing in Thy sight, and what is right according to Thy commandment. May my heart be in Thy hand, to accomplish all that is to the profit of the people committed to my charge and to Thy glory, that so in the day of Thy judgment I may give Thee account of my stewardship without blame; through the grace and mercy of Thy Son, Who was once crucified for us, to Whom be all honor and glory with Thee and the Holy Spirit, the Giver of Life, unto ages of ages. Amen.

The Emperor now set aside his crown and the Orthodox Divine Liturgy immediately followed. The anointing portion of the ceremony took place during the liturgy, immediately prior to Communion. After the singing of the Communion hymn, the Tsar gave his sword to an attendant and he and the Tsaritsa ascended the Ambo in front of the Royal Doors of the iconostasis, which were thrown open at that moment. There each was anointed with holy chrism by the Patriarch or Metropolitan. The Tsar was anointed on his forehead, eyes, nostrils, mouth, ears, breast and both sides of each hand, then he stepped aside to his right and stood in front of the icon of Christ. His consort then stepped forward and was anointed on her forehead only, then she stepped to her left and stood before the icon of the Theotokos. Each anointing was accompanied by the words, "the seal of the gift of the Holy Spirit." Bells and a second 101-gun salvo ensued.

After his anointing, but prior to the partaking of Holy Communion, the Tsar recited a coronation oath, in which he swore to preserve the autocracy intact and to rule his realm with justice and fairness. Russia's last Tsar, Nicholas II, would refer to his coronation oath as one reason he could not give in to demands for a liberal constitution and parliamentary government. The Metropolitan next escorted the Tsar through the Royal Doors (normally permitted only to deacons, priests or bishops) into the altar, where the Tsar partook of the bread and wine separately, in clerical fashion. This was the only time the Tsar—or any Orthodox layperson—was ever permitted to receive communion in this manner. Unlike the Tsar, the Tsaritsa remained outside the Royal Doors and communicated in standard Orthodox lay fashion, receiving both the bread and the wine together on a spoon.

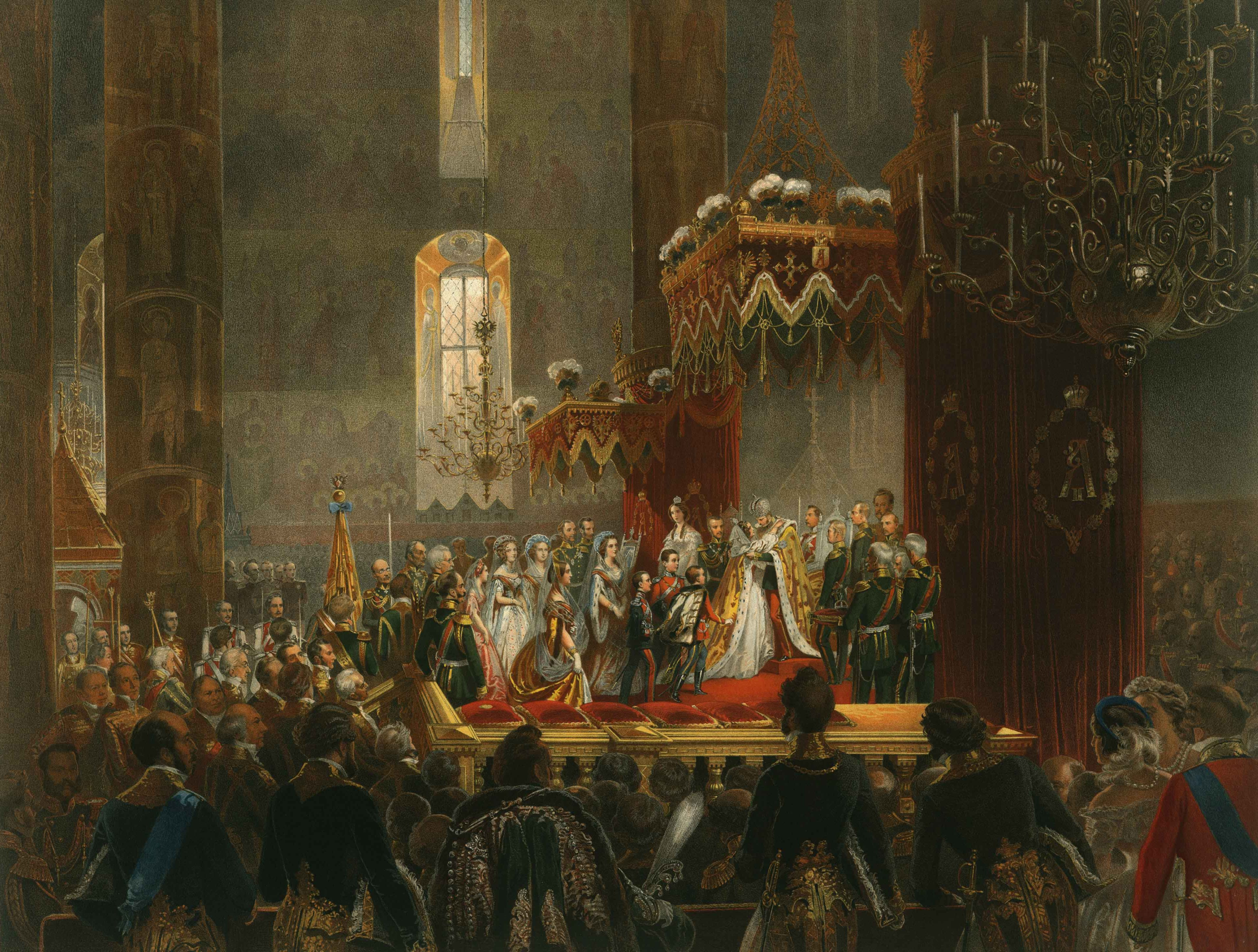
Homage to Alexander II

=== The service concludes ===
After receiving Holy Communion, the Tsar and Tsaritsa returned to their thrones, where the "Prayers After Receipt of Holy Communion" were read over them by their Father Confessor. Following this, the Tsar received homage from his wife, mother (if living) and other family members, nobles, and notable subjects present at his coronation. The dismissal was read, as the Archdeacon intoned a special blessing for the Tsar and Imperial Family, with the choir singing "many years" three times. This concluded the portion of the coronation conducted inside the cathedral, but other separate ceremonies and celebrations still remained.

== After the service ==
=== Return to the palace ===
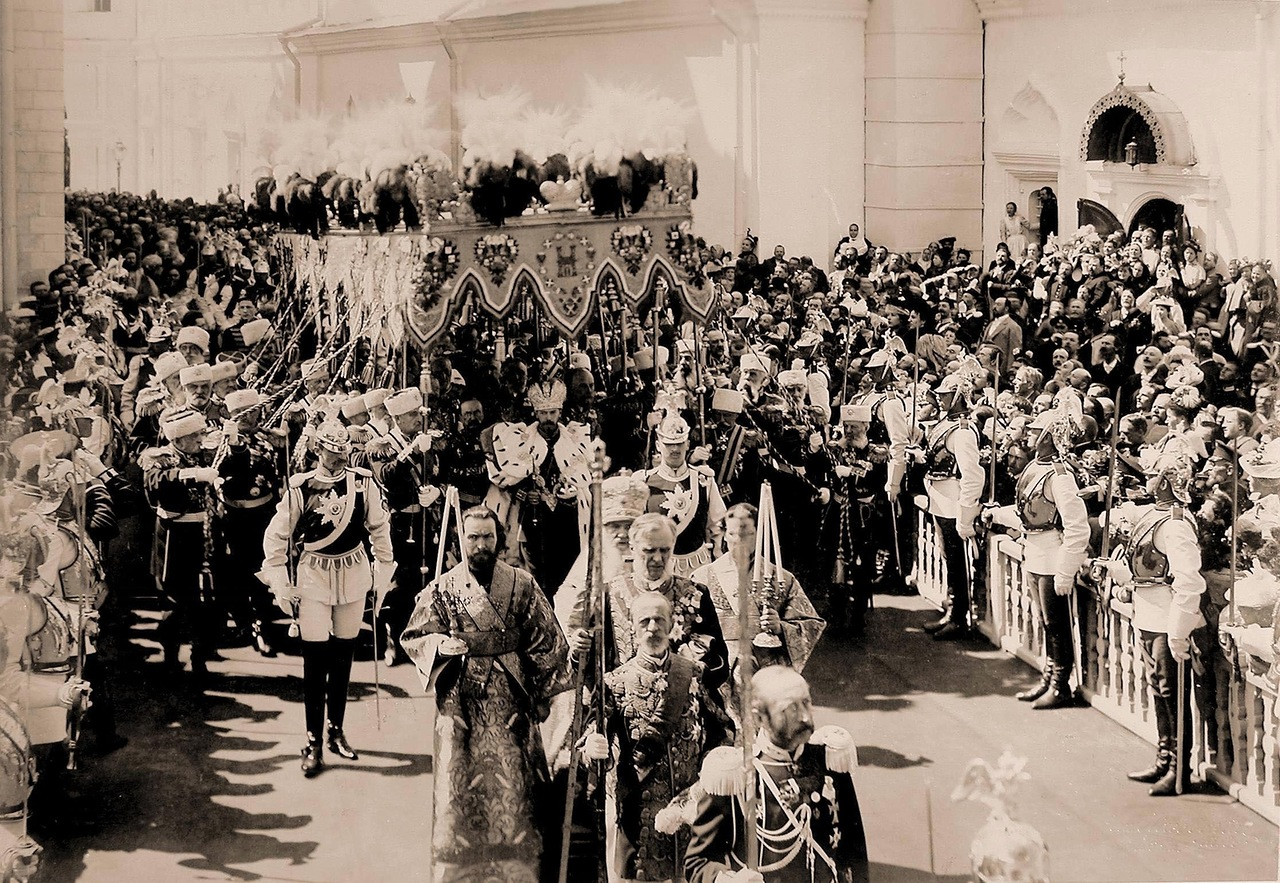
After his coronation, Tsar Nicholas II leaves Dormition Cathedral. The Chevalier Guard Lieutenant marching in front to the Tsar's right is Baron Carl Gustaf Mannerheim, later President and Marshal of Finland.

At the conclusion of the Liturgy, the Tsar and his entourage proceeded to the nearby Archangel and Annunciation cathedrals within the Kremlin, where further rites were conducted. After this, the newly crowned monarchs proceeded under canopies back to the Red Porch of the Kremlin, where they rested and prepared for a great ceremonial meal at the Kremlin's Hall of Facets. During their procession back to their Kremlin palace, later rulers (starting with Nicholas I) stopped on the Red Staircase and bowed three times to the assembled people in the courtyard, symbolizing what one historian has called "an unspoken bond of devotion" between ruler and subjects.

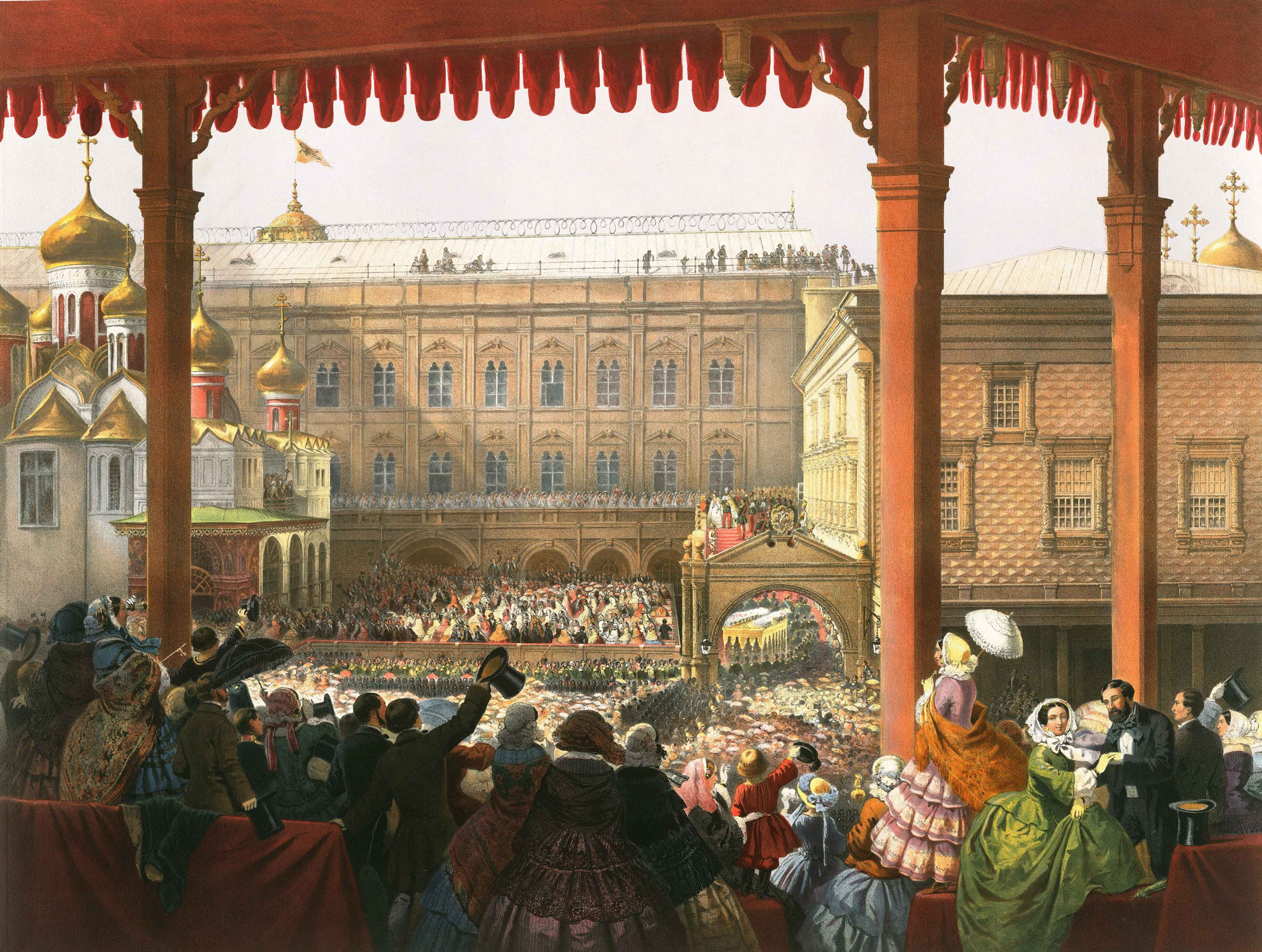
Alexander II bows to his people atop the Kremlin's Red Staircase

Inside the palace, the Tsar and Tsaritsa greeted representatives of their many Muslim subjects and other non-Christian guests; protocol prohibited non-Christians from witnessing inside the cathedral. At the coronation of Nicholas II and Alexandra, the Chinese statesman Li Hongzhang was one of the guests, representing his emperor. In another room of the palace stood a group of people in normal clothes; these were descendants of people who had saved the lives of Russian rulers at one time or another. After greeting all of these people, the sovereigns rested for a short while and prepared for the evening's banquet.

=== The coronation banquet ===
The Tsar's coronation banquet was held on the evening of his coronation, in the Granovitaya Palata, council chamber of Muscovite rulers. The walls were adorned with frescoes, and a special table was set for the Tsar and his consort, who dined alone while being served by high-ranking members of the court. Foreign ambassadors were admitted one at a time, and the new sovereign drank a toast with each in turn. Foreign princes (no foreign rulers were ever invited to a Russian coronation, but foreign princes attended as representatives of their own monarchs) were seated in an upper gallery or Tainik, as only Russians could take part in the banquet itself.

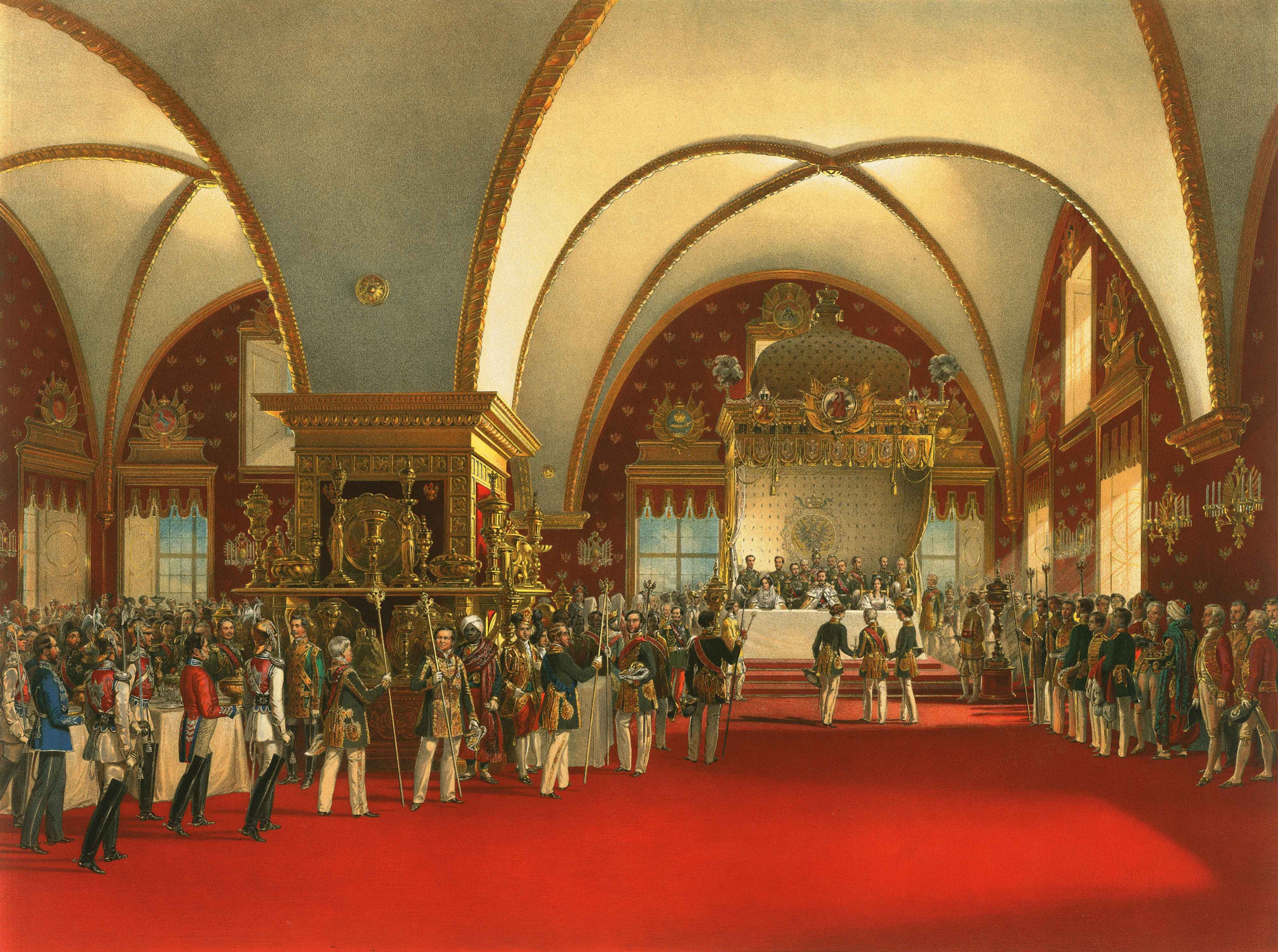
Coronation banquet of Alexander II in the Palace of Facets

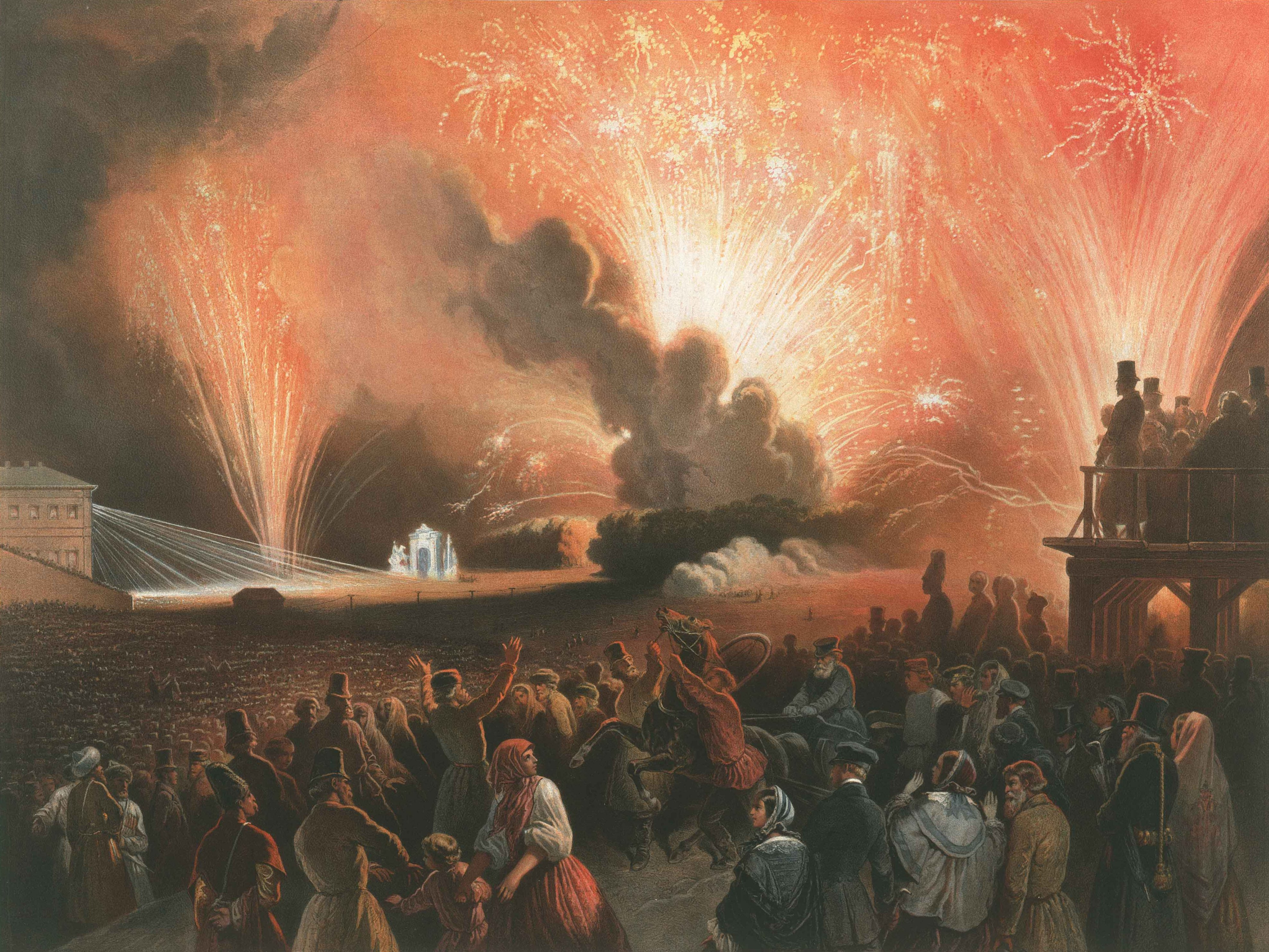
Fireworks following Alexander II's coronation in 1856

According to biographer Robert K. Massie, the following items were served at Nicholas II's coronation dinner in 1896:

Borsch and pepper-pot soup,
Turnovers filled with meat,
Steamed fish,
Whole spring lamb,
Pheasants in cream sauce,
Asparagus and Salad,
Sweet fruits in wine,
Ice cream.

=== Other celebrations ===
Following the banquet, the newly crowned monarchs attended other ceremonies, often including a grand illumination of the Kremlin, fireworks, operas, and various balls. A special celebration was often organized for the common people of Moscow, usually a day or so after the ceremony at a nearby location where the Tsar and Tsaritsa would attend a feast held for their subjects and inexpensive souvenirs were given away. The celebration at Nicholas II's coronation in 1896 was marred by the Khodynka Tragedy, when 1,389 persons were trampled to death during a crowd crush prompted by rumors that there were not enough mementos to go around.

With the abolition of the monarchy after the Russian Revolution of 1917, coronation ceremonies no longer play any role in Russian political or religious life.

== List of Russian coronations ==
While earlier rulers of Muscovy had been crowned prior to Prince Ivan III, the coronation ceremony in its "Byzantine" form was first brought to Russia by Ivan's wife, Sophia Paleologue, niece to the last Emperor of Byzantium, Constantine XI. Sophia is credited with introducing this and other Byzantine ceremonies and customs, which were adopted by her husband Ivan III and continued under his Muscovite and Russian successors. The modern coronation, introducing "European-style" elements, was first used for Catherine I in 1724.

While several Russian rulers had more than one consort during their reigns, this table will list only that consort (if any) who was crowned with him or her at the time of their coronation. There are two exceptions to this rule:

- Marina Mniszech, who married Dmitriy I the False after he had already been crowned as Tsar, and was afforded her own coronation after their wedding.
- Yekaterina Alexeyevna, second wife of Peter I, who was crowned as co-ruler of Russia in 1724 and subsequently ascended the throne as Catherine I after Peter's death.

Other Russian sovereigns either did not have consorts at the time of their coronations, did not ever crown their consorts, or (beginning with Paul I and continuing until Nicholas II) had them crowned with them at their own coronations.

=== Rurik dynasty ===
Grand Prince Ivan III of Moscow was the first Russian ruler to break free of the Tatar Yoke; he claimed the title "Grand Prince of All Russia" and used the title "Tsar" in diplomatic correspondence. His grandson, Ivan IV, was the first to be formally crowned as "Tsar of All Russia", as opposed to his predecessors' formal title.

Coronation	Monarch's image	Monarch's name	Reign	Consort's name	Consort's image
April 14, 1502		Ivan III	1462–1505	consorts uncrowned	/
April 14, 1502 (with his father)		Vasili III	1505–1533	consorts uncrowned	/
January 16, 1547		Ivan IV	1533–1584	consorts uncrowned	/
May 31, 1584		Feodor I	1584–1598	consort uncrowned	/

=== Time of Troubles ===
Following the death of Tsar Feodor I, Russia descended into a fifteen-year period of political unrest, famine, upheaval and foreign invasion known as the Time of Troubles. Some of the rulers during this period did not reign long enough or enjoy the political stability necessary to hold a coronation, while one was a foreigner, Wladyslaw IV Vasa of the Polish–Lithuanian Commonwealth. From July 1610 to July 1613, two rival councils of nobles claimed power; Russia had no Tsar at all from December 4, 1612 to July 26, 1613, when Michael Romanov was elected to the throne by the Zemsky Sobor, establishing the Romanov Dynasty.

At the time of Tsar Dmitriy I the False's coronation in 1605, he was unmarried; however, after his marriage to Marina Mniszech of Poland in 1606, his consort was granted her own crowning ceremony upon her arrival in Moscow.

Coronation	Monarch's image	Monarch's name	Reign	Consort's name	Consort's image
February 21, 1598		Boris Godunov	1598–1605	consort uncrowned	/
July 21, 1605		Dmitriy I the False	1605–1606	no consort at time of coronation	/
May 8, 1606	/	Dmitriy I the False (already crowned; see above)	1605–1606	Marina Mniszech	

=== Romanov dynasty ===
The Romanov dynasty came to power in July 1613, and ruled Russia until the Russian Revolution of 1917, when the monarchy was abolished. Tsars Ivan VI and Peter III were never crowned, as neither reigned long enough to have a coronation ceremony. Peter the Great adopted the formal title of "Emperor" during his reign and his successors used it until the Revolution, but common usage still assigned the title of "Tsar" to the Russian monarch.

Coronation	Monarch's image	Monarch's name	Reign	Consort's name	Consort's image
July 22, 1613		Michael	1613–1645	consorts uncrowned	/
September 28, 1645		Alexis	1645–1676	consorts uncrowned	/
June 18, 1676		Feodor III	1676–1682	consorts uncrowned	/
June 25, 1682		Peter I "The Great" with Ivan V	1682–1725	first consort uncrowned; second consort crowned co-ruler as Catherine I (see below)	/
June 25, 1682		Ivan V with Peter I "The Great"	1682–1696	consorts uncrowned	/
May 7, 1724		Catherine I	1725–1727	consort to Peter I; crowned as his co-ruler; ruled alone after his death without remarrying	/
February 25, 1728		Peter II	1727–1730	no consort	/
April 28, 1730		Anna	1730–1740	no consort	/
May 6, 1742		Elizabeth	1741–1762	no consort	/
September 22, 1762		Catherine II "The Great"	1762–1796	no consort	/
April 5, 1797		Paul	1796–1801	Maria Feodorovna (Sophie Dorothea of Württemberg)	
September 15, 1801		Alexander I	1801–1825	Elizabeth Alexeievna (Louise of Baden)	
September 3, 1826		Nicholas I	1825–1855	Alexandra Feodorovna (Charlotte of Prussia)	
September 7, 1856		Alexander II	1855–1881	Maria Alexandrovna (Marie of Hesse)	
May 15, 1883		Alexander III	1881–1894	Maria Feodorovna (Dagmar of Denmark)	
May 26, 1896		Nicholas II	1894–1917	Alexandra Feodorovna (Alix of Hesse)	
