= Tsarina =

Title of a female autocratic ruler of Bulgaria or Russia

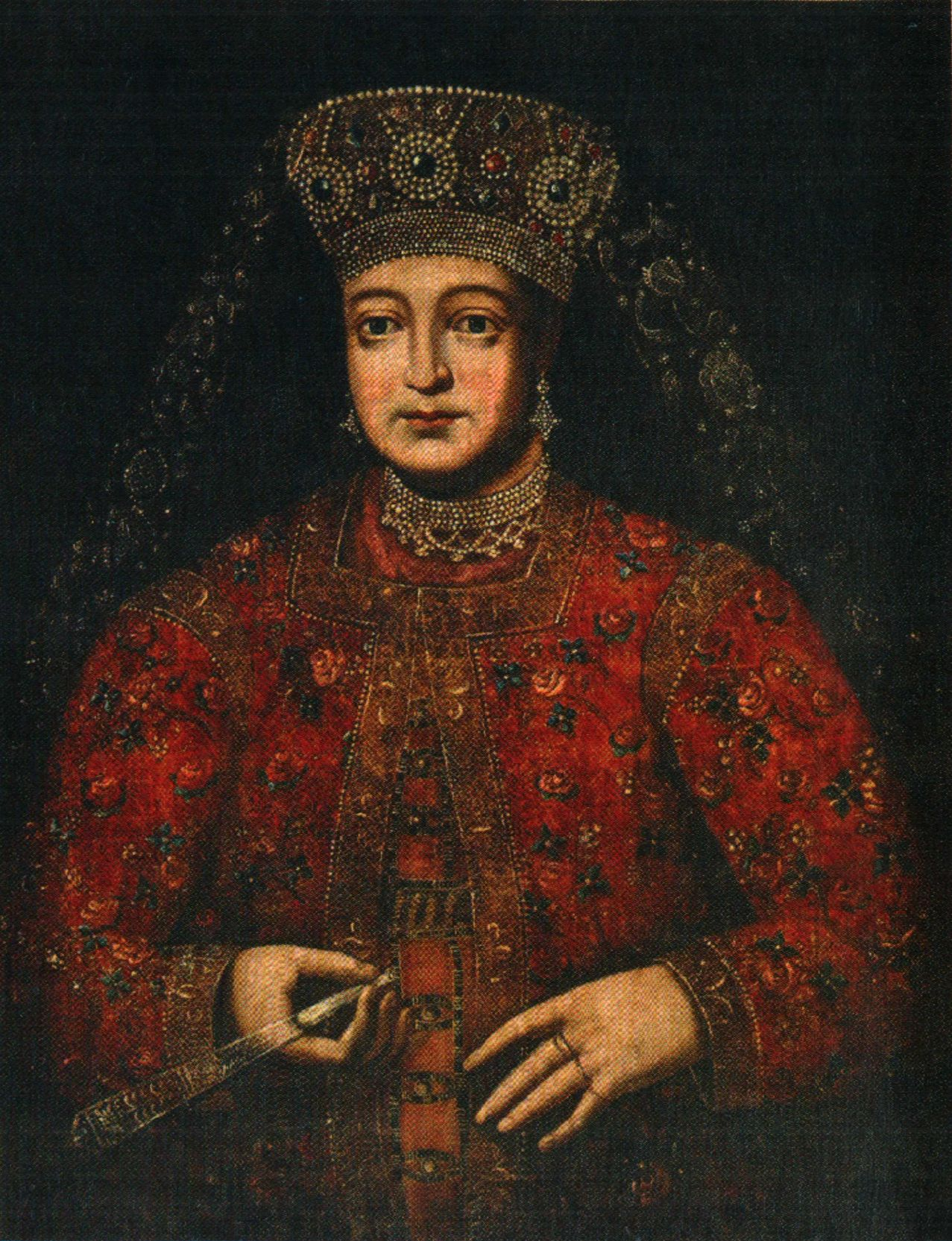
Tsarina Marfa Apraxina of Russia, wife of Tsar Feodor III and Peter the Great's sister-in-law

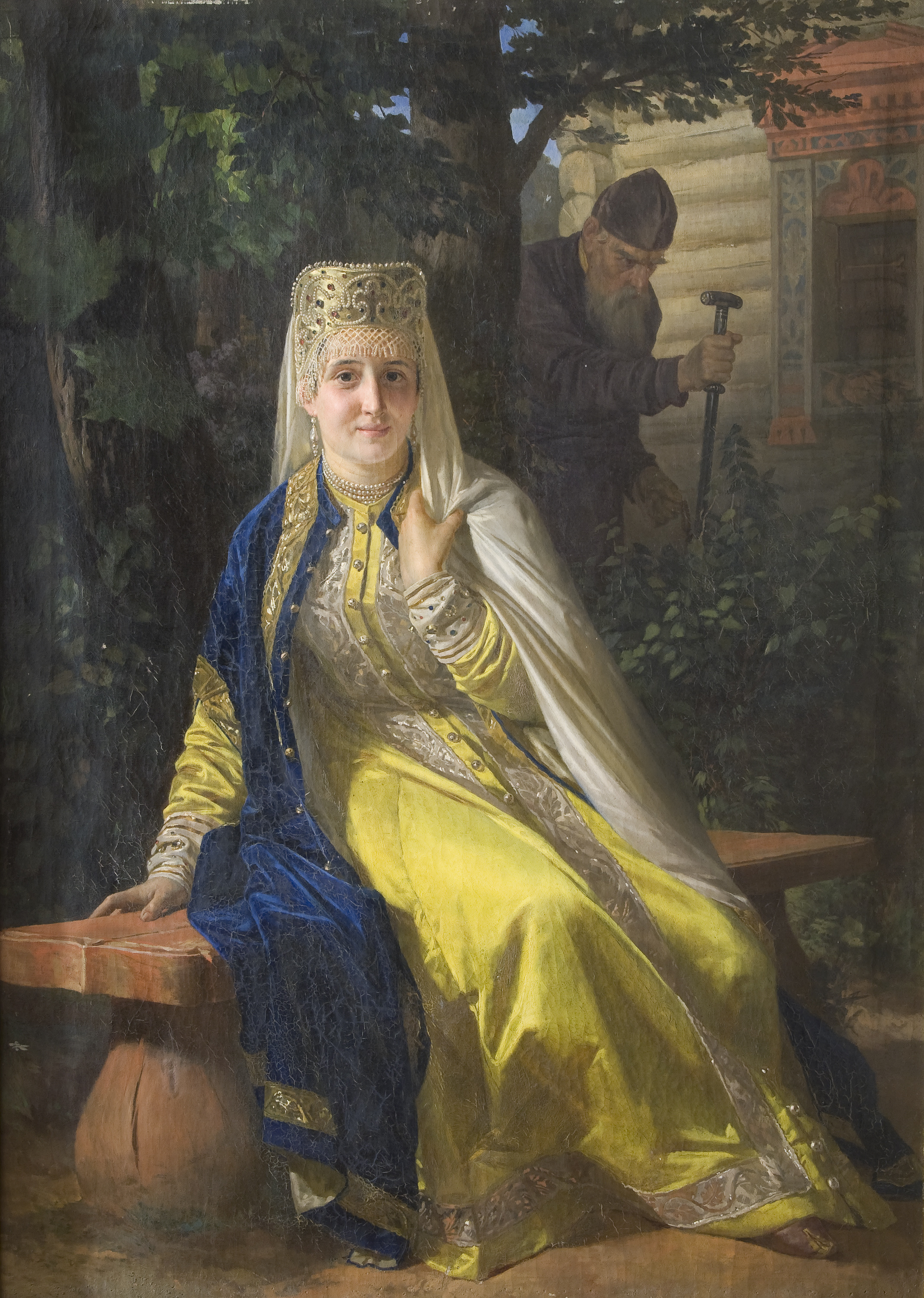
One of the young wives of Ivan the Terrible. Painting by Nikolai Nevrev, 19th century

Tsarina (or tsaritsa; (Note: Also spelled csarina (csaricsa), tzarina (tzaritza), carina (carica), or czarina (czaricza)) Cyrillic: царица) is the title of a female autocratic ruler (monarch) of Bulgaria, Serbia, and Russia, or the title of a tsar's wife. The English spelling is derived from the German czarin or zarin, in the same way as the French tsarine / czarine, and the Spanish and Italian czarina / zarina. A tsar's daughter is a tsarevna.

"Tsarina" or "tsaritsa" was the title of the female supreme ruler in the following states:

- Bulgaria: from 913 to 1018, from 1185 to 1422, and from 1908 to 1946
- Serbia: from 1346 to 1371
- Russia: officially from about 1547 to 1721, unofficially from 1721 to 1917 (officially "Empresses").

== Russia ==
Since 1721, the official titles of the Russian male and female monarchs were emperor (император, imperator) and empress (императрица, imperatritsa) or empress consort, respectively. Officially the last Russian tsarina was Eudoxia Lopukhina, Peter the Great's first wife. Alexandra Feodorovna (Alix of Hesse), the wife of Nicholas II of Russia, was the last Russian empress.

Eudoxia Lopukhina was sent to a monastery in 1698 (which was the usual way the emperor "divorced" his wife), and she died in 1731. In 1712 Peter married in church Catherine I of Russia. The Russian Empire was officially proclaimed in 1721, and Catherine became empress by marriage. After Peter's death she became ruling empress by her own right. In following centuries, the title "tsarina" was in unofficial informal use – a kind of "pet name" for empresses, whether ruling queens or queen consorts. ("Mother dear-tsaritsa" (матушка-царица) was used only for Catherine the Great, the most popular empress.)

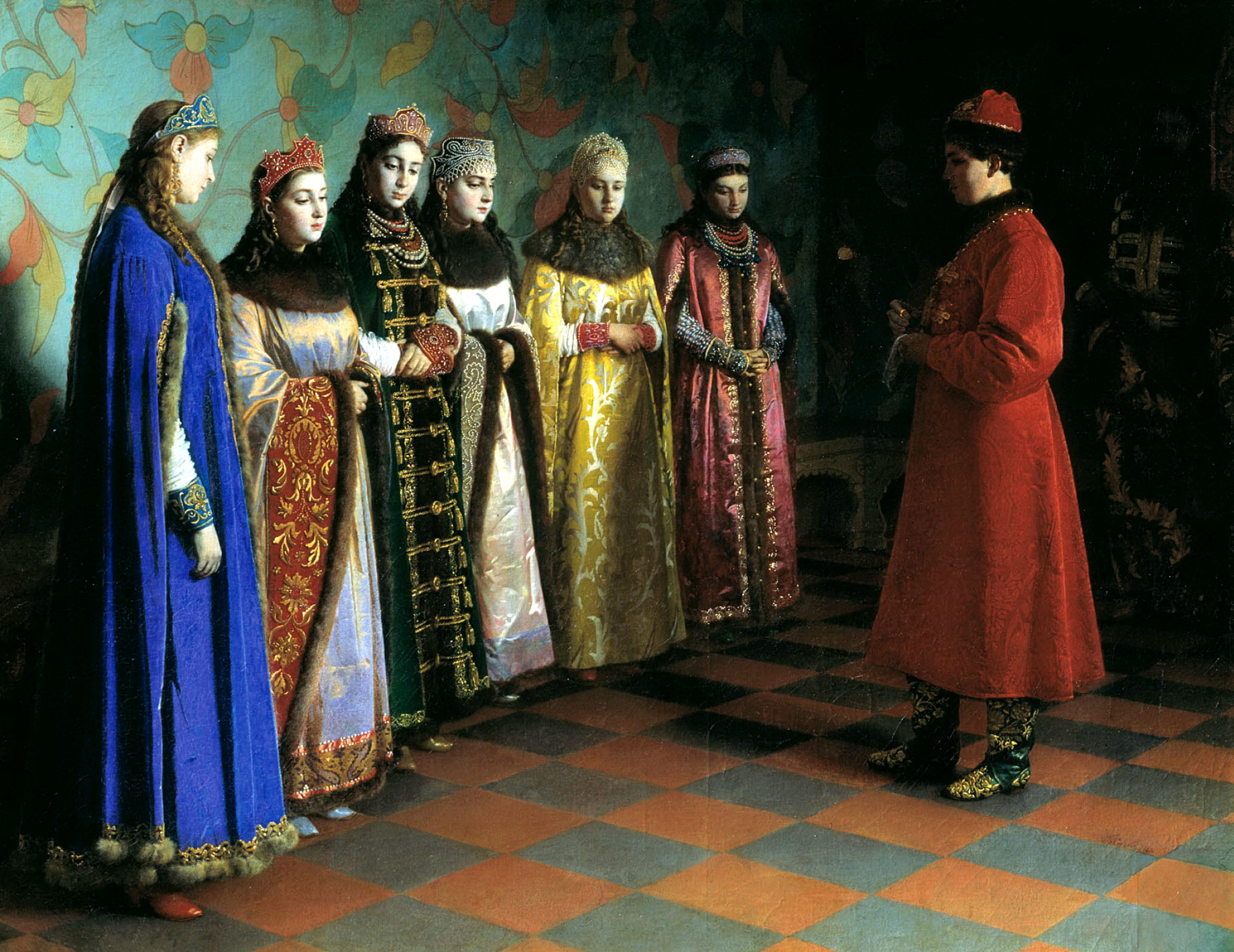
Tsar Alexis of Russia choosing his bride in 1648. Painting by Grigory Sedov, 19th century

De jure tsarinas in Russia existed from 1547 until 1721. Among the most famous tsarinas of this period were six or seven wives of Ivan the Terrible, who were poisoned by his enemies, killed or imprisoned by him in monasteries. However, only the first four of them were crowned tsarinas, as the later marriages were not blessed by the Orthodox Church and were considered as cohabitation. Polish noblewoman Marina Mnishek also became tsarina of Russia by her marriage to the impostor False Dmitry I and later to False Dmitry II.

Many wives were chosen by bride-show (the custom of beauty pageant, borrowed from the Byzantine Empire), when hundreds of poor but handsome noblewomen gathered in Moscow from all the regions of Russia and the tsar chose the most beautiful. This deprived Russia of the benefits of royal intermarriage with European monarchs, but protected from inbreeding, as well as from the political influence of foreign princesses (Catholic or Protestant). The only foreign wife of a Russian tsar in this early era (except Mnishek) was Maria Temryukovna, a Circassian princess, who converted to Orthodoxy.

== Bulgaria ==
The second Bulgarian ruler to use the title tsar (the first having been Tervel) was Simeon I of Bulgaria, and his consort (her name is uncertain, reportedly Maria Sursuvul) used the title tsarina. The title was used by subsequent Bulgarian consorts until the end of the First Bulgarian Empire in 1018. The last royal spouse to use the title was Maria, the wife of Ivan Vladislav of Bulgaria.

When the Second Bulgarian Empire was created in 1185 the rulers again adopted the title tsar and their consorts were therefore called tsarinas.

In the Third Bulgarian State, Ferdinand I of Bulgaria adopted the title tsar after he proclaimed Bulgaria's Independence in 1908, and his wife, Eleonore Reuss of Köstritz, previously knyaginya, became tsaritsa. The last Bulgarian tsaritsa was Giovanna of Italy, the wife of Tsar Boris III of Bulgaria. Margarita Gómez-Acebo y Cejuela, the wife of Simeon II of Bulgaria, is also sometimes referred to as a tsaritsa.

== Serbia ==
The first Serbian tsarina was Helena of Bulgaria, sister of Bulgarian Tsar Ivan Alexander and wife of Tsar Stephen Uroš IV Dušan of Serbia. She was the empress consort of Serbia from 1346 until Dušan's sudden death in 1355.

The second (and the last) Serbian tsarina was Anna, Empress of Serbia, from the Wallachian noble house of Basarab. She married Dušan's son, Tsar Stephen Uroš V of Serbia, sometime in the 1350s, and ruled until the Serbian empire's demise in 1371.

== See also ==
- Tsarevna – a tsar's daughter
- List of Russian consorts
- List of Serbian consorts
- List of Bulgarian consorts
