= Feodor III of Russia =

Tsar of Russia from 1676 to 1682

Feodor III
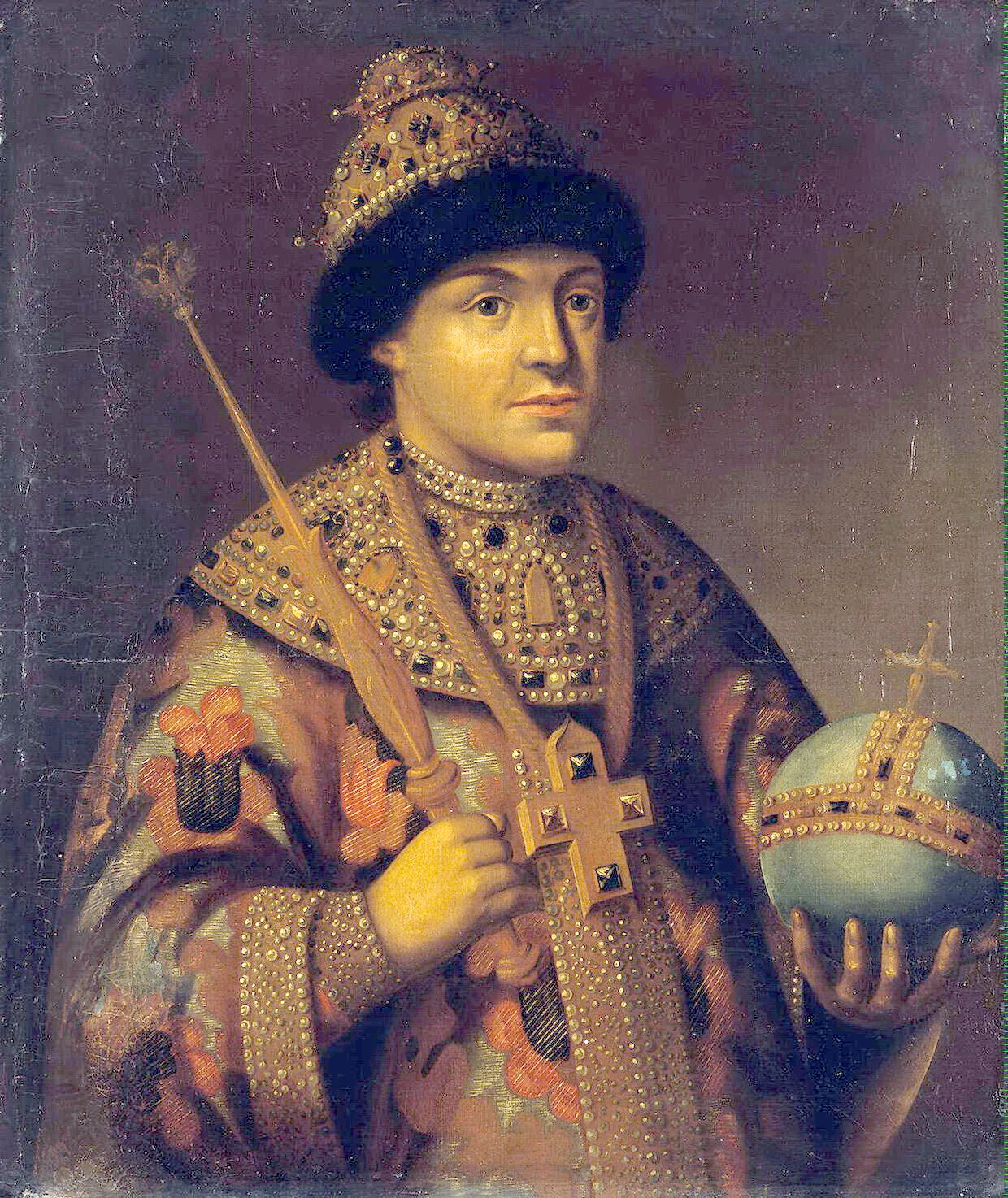
- Portrait c. 1676–1682

Tsar of all Russia
- Reign: 8 February 1676 – 7 May 1682
- Coronation: 18 June 1676
- Predecessor: Alexis
- Successor: Peter I and Ivan V
- Born: 9 June 1661; Moscow, Russia
- Died: 7 May 1682 (aged 20); Moscow, Russia
- Burial: Cathedral of the Archangel
- Spouses: Agafya Grushetskaya (m. 1680; died 1681) Marfa Apraxina (m. 1682)
Names
- Feodor Alexeevich Romanov
- House: Romanov
- Father: Alexis of Russia
- Mother: Maria Miloslavskaya
- Religion: Russian Orthodoxy

Feodor III or Fyodor III Alekseyevich (Russian: Фёдор III Алексеевич; (Note: Pre-reform spelling: Ѳеодоръ Алеѯіевичъ) 9 June 1661 – 7 May 1682) was Tsar of all Russia from 1676 until his death in 1682. Despite poor health from childhood, he managed to pass reforms on improving meritocracy within the civil and military state administration as well as founding the Slavic Greek Latin Academy.

== Life ==
Born in Moscow, Fyodor, as the eldest surviving son of Tsar Alexis and Maria Miloslavskaya, succeeded his father on the throne in 1676 at the age of fifteen. He had a fine intellect and a noble disposition; he had received an excellent education at the hands of Simeon Polotsky, the most learned Slavonic monk of the day. He knew Polish and even possessed the unusual accomplishment of Latin. He had been disabled from birth, however, horribly disfigured and half paralysed by a mysterious disease, supposedly scurvy. He spent most of his time with young nobles, Ivan Maksimovich Yazykov and Aleksei Timofeievich Likhachov.

On 28 July 1680 he married a noblewoman, Agaphia Simeonovna Grushevskaya (1663–1681), daughter of Simeon Feodorovich Grushevsky and of his wife Maria Ivanovna Zaborovskaya, and assumed the sceptre. His native energy, though crippled, was not crushed by his disabilities. He soon showed himself as a thorough and devoted reformer. The atmosphere of the court ceased to be oppressive, the light of a new liberalism shone, and the severity of the penal laws was considerably mitigated. The Tsar founded the academy of sciences in the Zaikonospassky monastery, where competent professors were to teach everything not expressly forbidden by the Orthodox church – the syllabus included Slavonic, Greek, Latin and Polish.

The Feodorean and the later Petrine reforms differed in that while the former were primarily, though not exclusively, for the benefit of the church, the latter were primarily for the benefit of the state. A household census took place in 1678. The most notable reform of Feodor III, made at the suggestion of Vasily Galitzine, involved the abolition in 1682 of the system of mestnichestvo, or "place priority", which had paralyzed the whole civil and military administration of Tsardom of Russia for generations. Henceforth all appointments to the civil and military services were to be determined by merit and by the will of the sovereign, while pedigree (nobility) books were to be destroyed.

== Family ==
Fyodor's first consort, Agaphia Simeonovna Grushevskaya, shared his progressive views. She was the first to advocate beard-shaving. On 11 July 1681, the Tsaritsa gave birth to her son, Tsarevich Ilya Fyodorovich, the expected heir to the throne. Agaphia died as a consequence of the childbirth three days later, on 14 July, and seven days later, on 21 July, the Tsarevich also died.

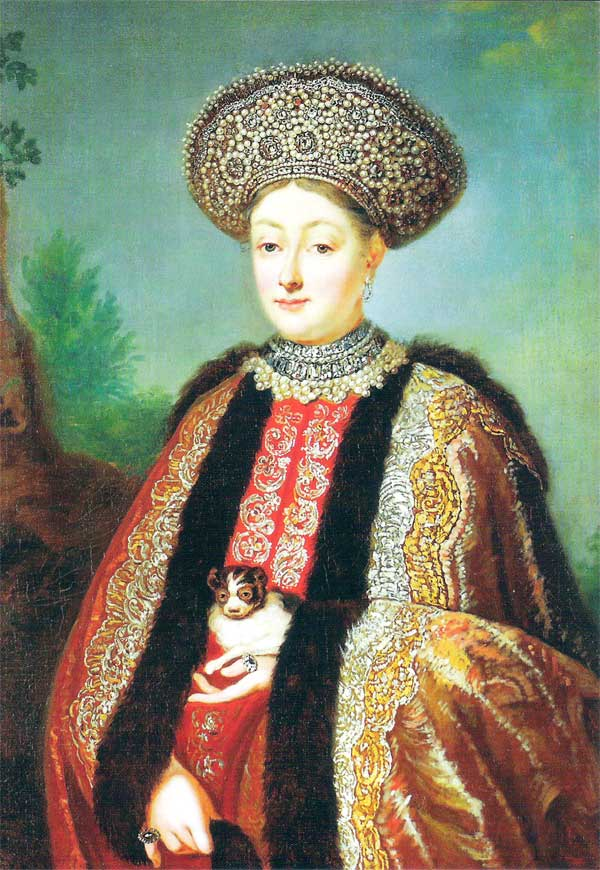
A portrait of Feodor III's second wife, Marfa Apraxina

Seven months later, on 24 February 1682 Fyodor married a second time Marfa Apraksina (1667–1716), daughter of Matvei Vasilievich Apraksin and wife Domna Bogdanovna Lovchikova. Feodor was so weak that he could not stand at the wedding. Feodor died three months after his second wedding, on 7 May, without surviving issue. The news of his death sparked the Moscow Uprising of 1682.

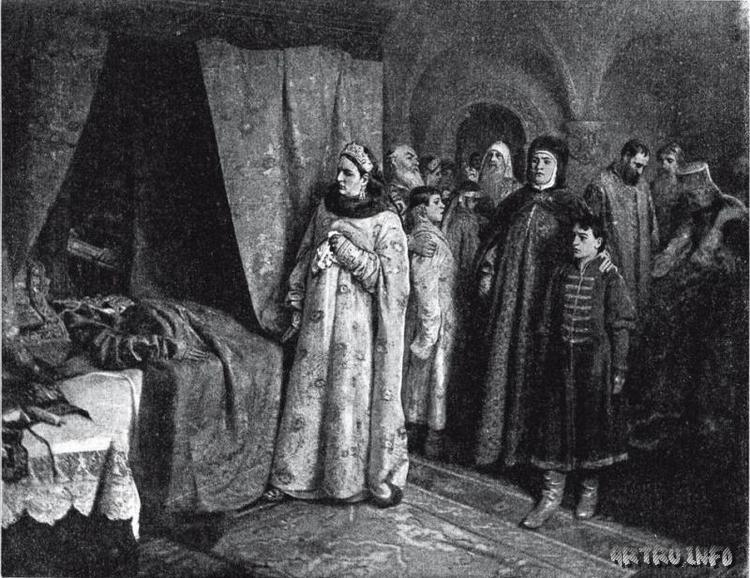
Depiction of Feodor III death

== See also ==
- Bibliography of Russian history (1613–1917)
- Russo-Turkish War (1676–1681)

== Sources ==
Regnal titles
Preceded by Alexis	Tsar of Russia; 1676–1682	Succeeded by Peter I and Ivan V
