= Feodosia Alekseyevna of Russia =

Feodosia Alekseyevna
- Tsarevna of Russia
- Born: Феодосия Алексеевна; 29 March 1662
- Died: 14 December 1713 (aged 51)
- House: Romanov
- Father: Alexis of Russia
- Mother: Maria Miloslavskaya

Tsarevna Feodosia Alekseyevna (Russian: Феодосия Алексеевна; 29 March 1662 – 14 December 1713) was the seventh daughter of Tsar Alexis of Russia and Maria Miloslavskaya, sister of Tsar Feodor III of Russia and Tsar Ivan V of Russia and half-sister of Tsar Peter the Great.

Feodosia Alekseyevna was described as a reserved and compassionate woman, with a need to be of use to those closest to her, and she lived a life in seclusion in the terem with her sisters and aunts, to whom she was devoted, and reportedly took no part in politics or the intrigues of the court. In 1683, it was noted that she lived in the household of her aunt Tsarevna Tatyana Mikhailovna of Russia and as devoted as a nun. For her part in the Streltsy uprising 1698 with her sister Marfa Alekseyevna of Russia, they were forced to become nuns. Feodosia became a nun under the name Susanna.
