= Nikita Pustosvyat. Debate about faith =

Large-format painting by Vasily Perov

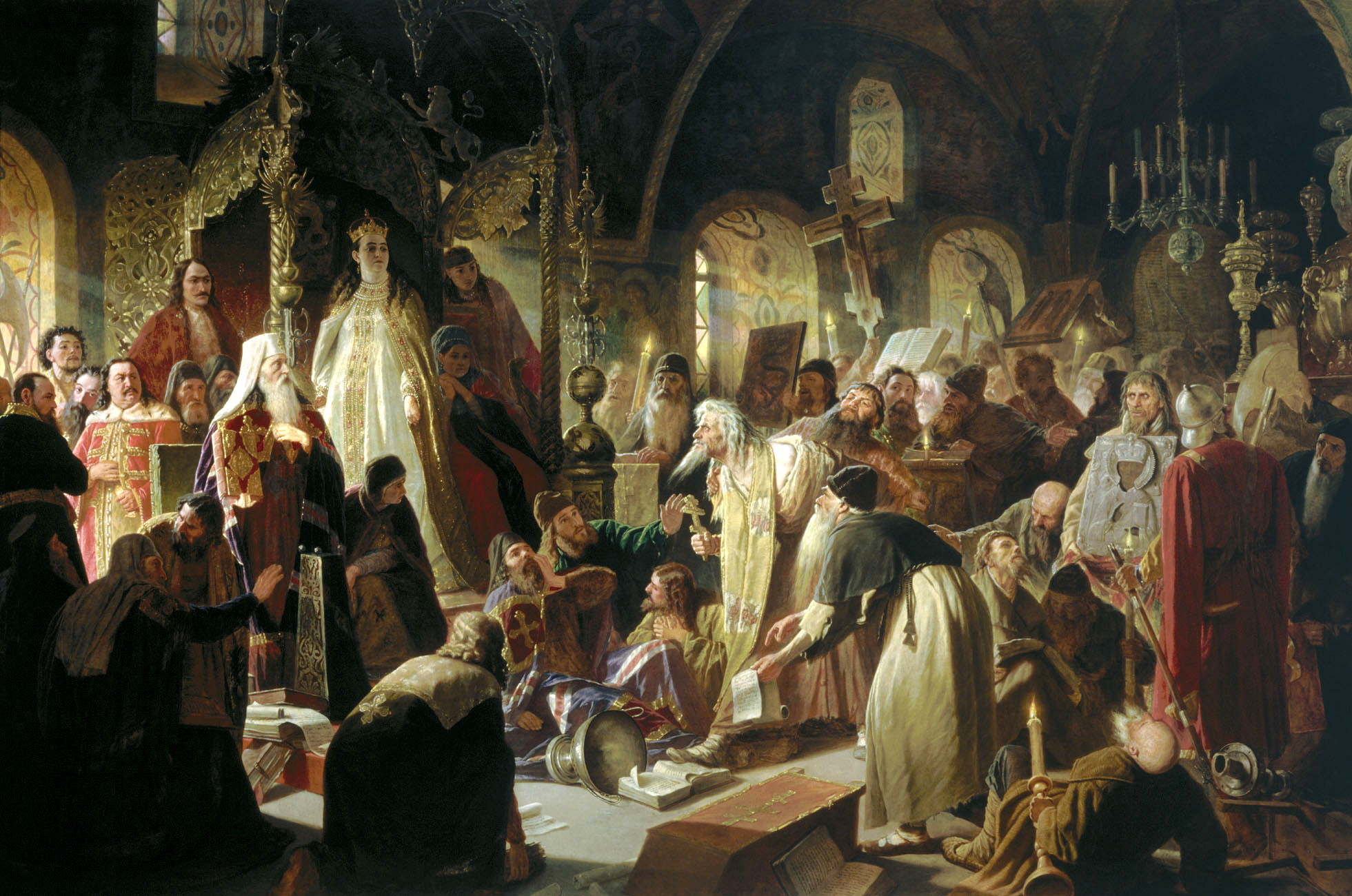
- Artist: Vasily Perov
- Year: 1880-1881
- Medium: Oil on canvas
- Dimensions: 336,5 cm × 512 cm (1,325 in × 202 in)
- Location: Tretyakov Gallery, Moscow

Nikita Pustosvyat. Debate about faith is a large-format painting by Russian artist Vasily Perov (1834-1882), created between 1880 and 1881. It belongs to the collection of the State Tretyakov Gallery (Inventory 407). The size of the painting is 336.5 × 512 cm. The painting was not finished due to tuberculosis which caused death of the artist, who died of consumption in 1882. In the same year, the canvas was purchased from Perov's heirs by Pavel Tretyakov.

The painting depicts the dramatic moment of the "faith Debate" — a historical event of the Moscow Uprising of 1682, the bicentennial of which Perov planned to complete the work on canvas. The debate took place on 5 July 1682 in the Palace of Facets of the Moscow Kremlin. The composition of the painting is based on the opposition of the right part, where there is a group of schismatics of the Old Believers led by the Suzdal priest Nikita Pustosvyat, and the left part, which depicts the rulers — Tsarevna Sophia Alexeyevna, Patriarch Joachim of Moscow, Archbishop Afanasy (Lyubimov) of Kholmogorsk and others.

Contemporaries praised a number of figures on the canvas. Especially in the right part, which was better elaborated. The writer Nikolai Leskov noted that "the painting Nikita Pustosvyat represents an amazing fact of artistic penetration" and the critic Vladimir Stasov wrote that Perov had "not only a crowd, agitated, rebellious, rumbling with a storm, but also soloists, colossal singers". In the Soviet period, the historical works of the late period of Vasily Perov's work, including Nikita Pustosvyat, were sharply criticized, and his views on history and religion were considered reactionary. At the same time, Perov's role in creating the concept of a historical hero who was ready to give his life for his beliefs was recognized, and the historicism permeating the entire figurative structure of the canvas was noted.

== History ==
Vasily Perov worked on the painting Nikita Pustosvyat. Debate about Faith –the largest of all his canvases– in 1880-1881. Art historian Olga Lyaskovskaya believes that work on the canvas most likely started earlier, in the late 1870s, because "the sheer size of the complex painting required many years of work". Apparently, Perov wanted to time the completion of the canvas to coincide with the bicentennial of the event depicted, which took place in 1682. When painting the picture, the artist used information from the novel by Evgeny Karnovich, On the Height and on the Share: Tsarevna Sophia Alexeevna, which was published in 1879. According to some reports, Perov was assisted in his work on the canvas by his student Alexander Novoskoltsev.

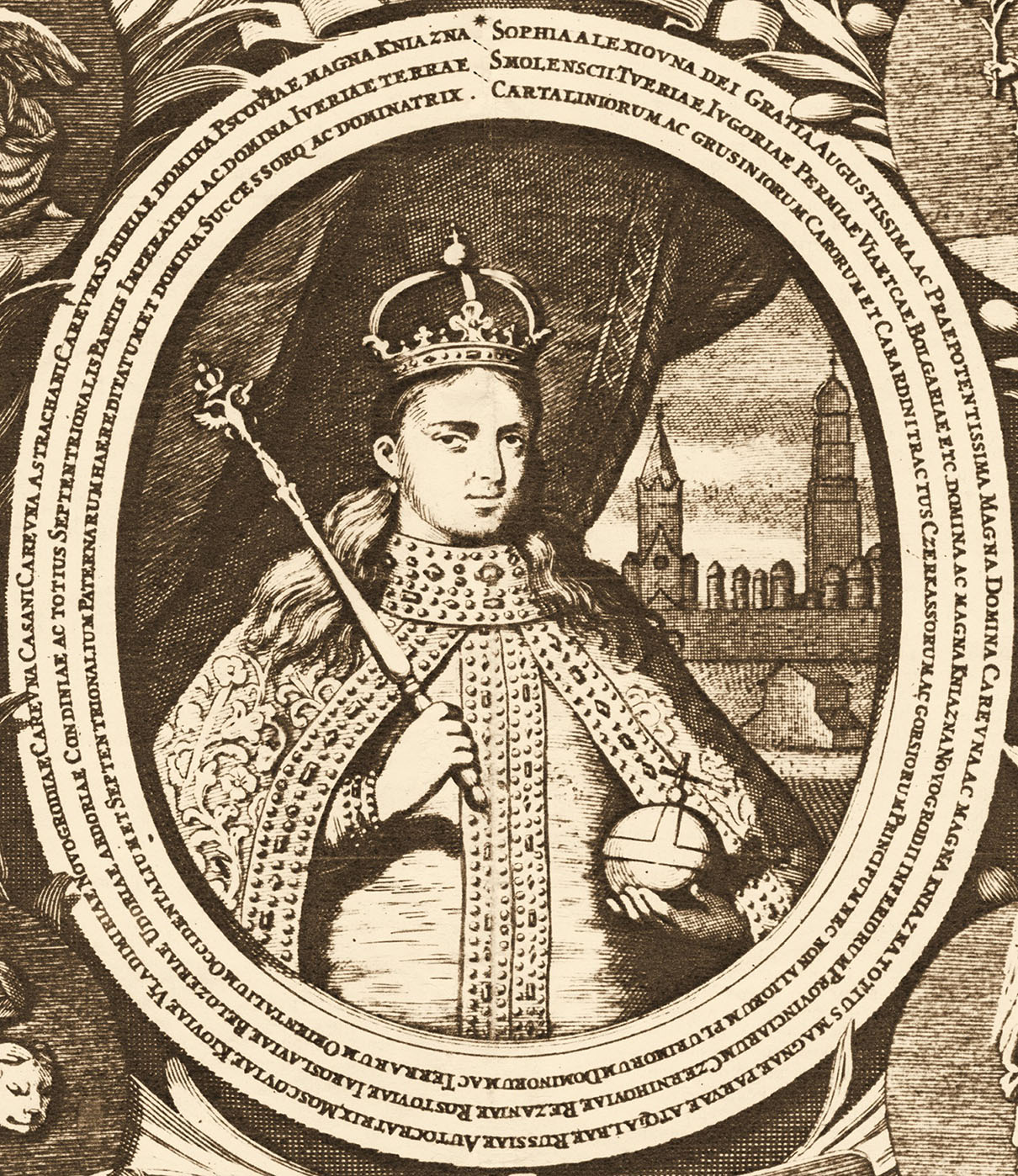
L. Tarasevich. Sophia Alexeevna (print, 1680s)

In an article on Perov included in volume 13 of the Russian Biographical Dictionary, the art historian Alexei Novitsky reports some information given to him by Elizaveta Egorovna, the artist's widow. According to her, the idea of creating the painting Nikita Pustosvyat most likely came to Perov under the influence of his communication with the writer Pavel Melnikov-Pechersky, with whom the artist repeatedly discussed problems of schism history. Melnikov-Pechersky provided Perov with the portraits needed to paint the left side of the picture. According to the same source, the artist Ivan Shishkin convinced Perov to undertake the painting of such a large canvas. Perov had long been looking for a suitable sitter for Nikita Pustosvyat and finally "found one among the vagrants". Art historian Vladimir Kemenov reported that to create the image of Tsarevna Sophia Alekseevna, Perov used a print by Leonty Tarasevich, created in the 1680s.

In September 1880, Perov was visited in his Moscow studio by the artist Ivan Kramskoi. Later, from St. Petersburg, Kramskoy wrote to Pavel Tretyakov: "Was at Perov, saw the painting Nikita Pustosvyat and found it and himself, and, most importantly, the picture, much better than expected. There are heads positively good". There are references to this painting in the memoirs of the artist Mikhail Nesterov, who described how the students of the natural class of the Moscow School of Painting, Sculpture, and Architecture, which taught Perov, came to him on his birthday: "The students met the birthday boy with his wife, invited him to the studio, where the entire wall stood Pustosvyat, and on the other Pugachevtsy" (referring to the painting Pugachev's Trial).

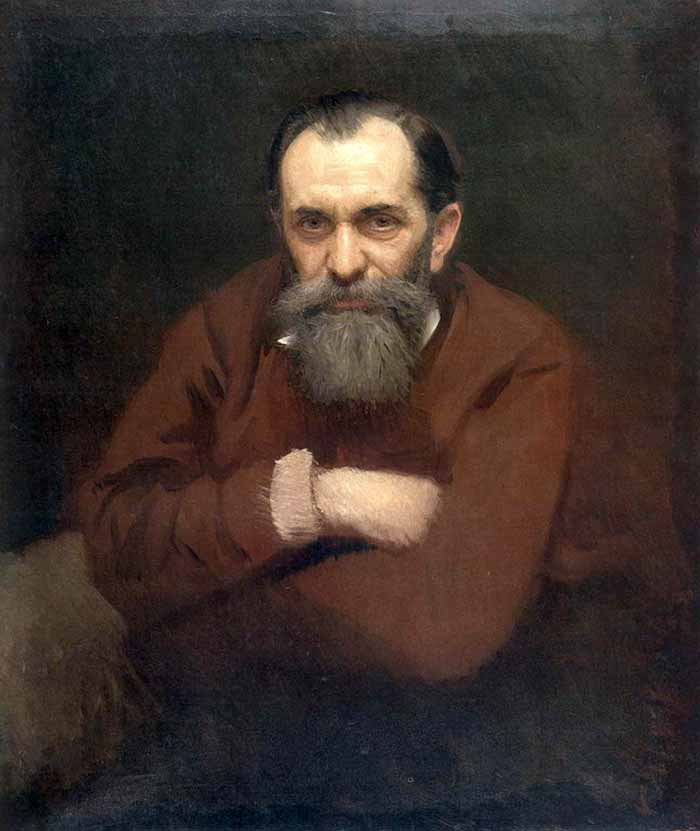
И. N. Kramskoy. Portrait of the artist V. G. Perov (canvas, oil, 81 × 71 cm, 1881, State Russian Museum of Fine Arts)

In the last year of his life, Perov was very ill, and, according to Alexei Novitsky, the painting Nikita Pustosvyat was "the artist's last song" with Perov "working on it even when he was barely able to hold a brush in his hands". Nevertheless, the canvas remained unfinished. The art historian Nikolai Sobko wrote that Perov was dissatisfied with many aspects of the painting, especially its right side, and "planned a lot of rewrites here anew, but death prevented him from fulfilling this intention". On 29 May (10 June) 1882, Vasily Perov died of tuberculosis, and in the same year, the painting was purchased from his heirs by Pavel Tretyakov.

The painting was not shown at exhibitions during the artist's lifetime, who, after leaving the Society for Travelling Art Exhibitions in 1877, practically did not participate in exhibition activities. Nikolai Sobko reported that the artist Mikhail Botkin managed to persuade Perov to send Nikita Pustosvyat (along with the painting The First Christians in Kiev) to the All-Russian Industrial and Art Exhibition, which opened in Moscow on 20 May 1882, a few days before the artist's death. The painting, under the title Nikita Pustosvyat (from the times of Tsarevna Sophia Alexeevna), did appear in the exhibition catalog, but for some reason, was not exhibited there.

In 1883, the canvas was included in the catalog of the posthumous exhibition of Perov's works held in St. Petersburg: according to some sources, it was exhibited there, and according to others, it was not. Be that as it may, during the exhibition, some specialists had the opportunity to familiarize themselves with the painting Nikita Pustosvyat. In particular, the artist Vladimir Osipov (a student of Pavel Chistyakov) expressed the following opinion about this work by Perov: "What beautiful things of his youth, what conscientiousness of execution. The two-fathoms canvas depicts the Faceted Chamber. The mass of figures, the extreme movements, the composition is confused, there is absolutely no stain - but the types are successful, the picture is only underpainted".

According to the catalog of the Tretyakov Gallery, the painting Nikita Pustosvyat. Debate about Faith was exhibited in Moscow in 1933-1934, and then at an exhibition in Leningrad in 1934. Both exhibitions were dedicated to the 100th anniversary of Perov's birth and were held in the buildings of the State Tretyakov Gallery and the State Russian Museum, respectively. The canvas also took part in the exhibition of Perov's works dedicated to the 150th anniversary of the artist's birth. This exhibition was held in 1984-1985, alternately in Moscow, Leningrad, Kyiv, and Minsk.

== Plot and description ==
The plot of the painting is based on the "debate about faith" — a historical event of the Moscow uprising of 1682, also known as Khovanshchina. After the death of Tsar Fyodor Alekseevich on 27 April 1682, the struggle for power between the boyar families of Miloslavsky and Naryshkin intensified. Tsarevna Sophia Alekseevna decided to take advantage of the discontent of the streltsy, who sided with Miloslavsky and executed a number of representatives of the Naryshkin family and their supporters. As a result of this Streltsy revolt, Sophia Alekseevna was declared regent under the minor tsars Ivan and Peter, and Prince Ivan Andreyevich Khovansky was appointed head of the Streltsy order. At the same time, sensing the weakness of the central government, the Old Believers became active. Their representatives gathered in Moscow and preached their views on the streltsky regiments, as well as proposed to hold an open theological debate on Red Square. The leader of the Old Believers —opponents of the official church— was the Suzdal priest Nikita Dobrynin, nicknamed Pustosvyat. Despite the support of Khovansky, the Old Believers failed to hold an open discussion, but on 5 July 1682 a "dispute about faith" took place in the Faceted Chamber of the Moscow Kremlin in the presence of Tsarevna Sophia Alekseevna and Patriarch Joachim.

Fragments of the painting Nikita Pustosvyat. Debate about Faith

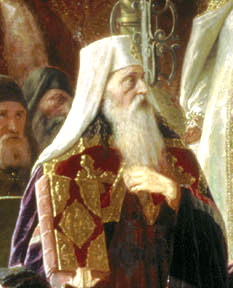
Patriarch Joachim

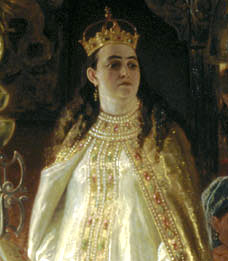
Sophia Alekseevna

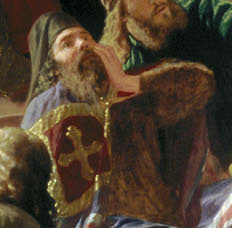
Архиепископ Афанасий

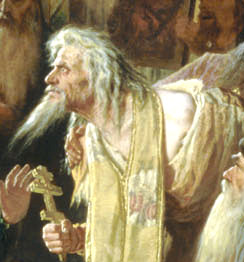
Nikita Pustosvyat

In front of the entrance to the Palace of Facets, on the Red Porch, the Old Believers clashed with the priests, who were not allowed into the room; in the resulting scuffle, Nikita Pustosvyat himself was grabbed by the hair by one of the priests. The arriving riflemen separated the fighters and escorted the Old Believers to the place of the dispute. In The History of Russia from the Earliest Times, Sergei Solovyov described their arrival: "The schismatics entered the Palace of Facets with noise and set up their analogion and candles, as in the square; they came to affirm the old faith, to destroy all innovations, but did not notice what an unprecedented innovation met them in the Granovitaya Chamber: only women in the royal seat! Tsarevna-maidens openly before all the people, and one tsarevna is in charge of everything!" According to Solovyov's description, on the throne next to Sophia Alekseevna sat her aunt Tatiana Mikhailovna, and lower in the chairs were Tsarina Natalia Kirillovna and Tsarevna Maria Alekseevna.

Patriarch Joachim asked the Old Believers why they had come and what their demands were. Nikita Pustosvyat answered: "We have come to the tsar-sovereigns to ask them to correct the Orthodox faith, to give us their righteous consideration with you, the new lawmakers, and that the churches of God be in peace and harmony." The patriarch objected that it was not proper for them to correct anything in church affairs, since they had not yet "touched the grammatical mind". Nikita replied, "We have not come to talk to you about grammar, but about Church dogmas!" Then Archbishop Athanasius of Kholmogorsk tried to object to him, but Pustosvyat jumped up to him with a raised hand, saying: "Why do you, foot, put yourself above your head? I am not speaking to you, but to the patriarch". The Streltsy dragged Nikita away from Athanasius, and Sophia stood up and began to say, "Do you see what Nikita is doing? In our eyes he beats the bishop, and without us he would have killed him".

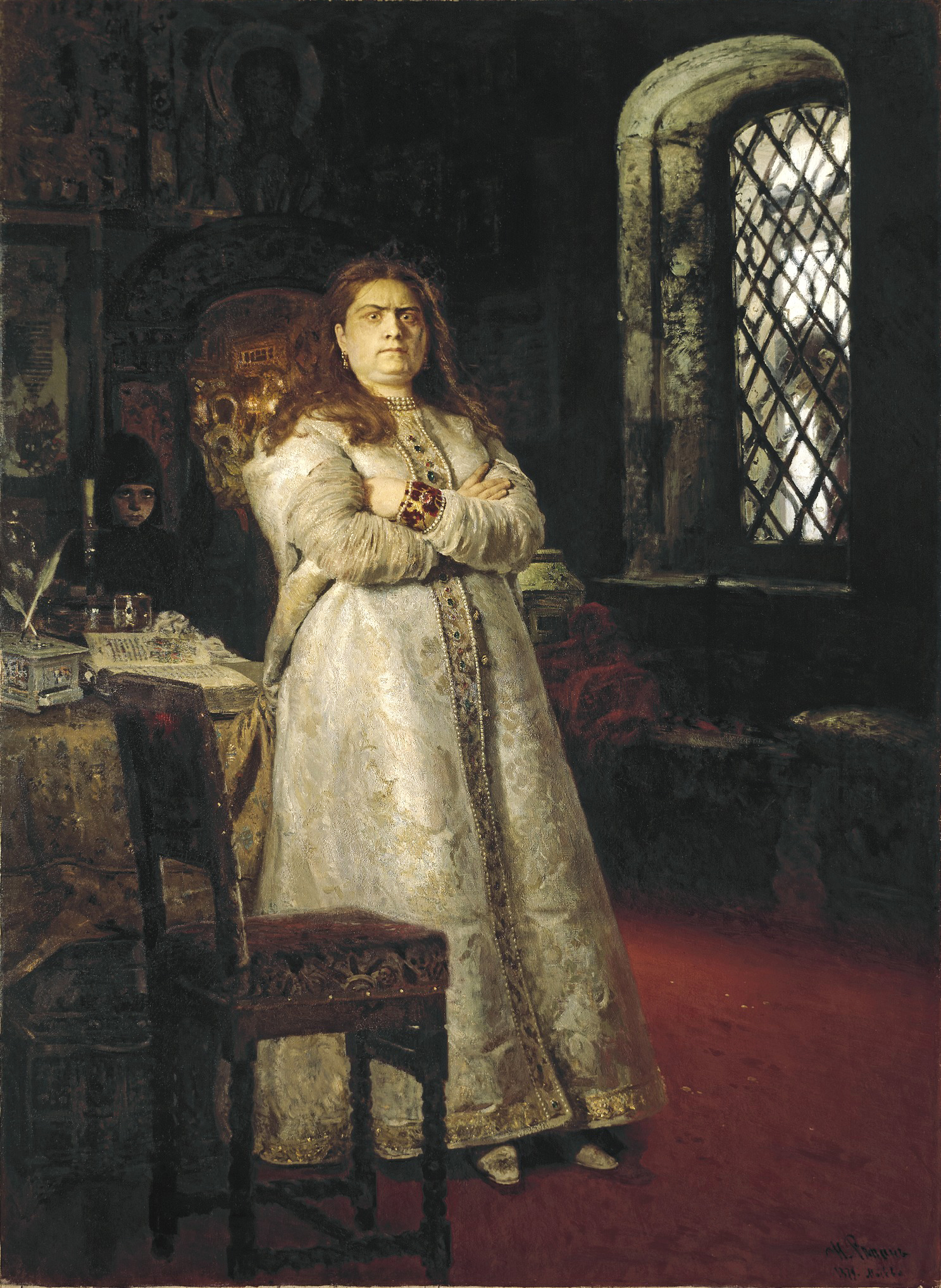
I. Repin. Tsarevna Sophia Alekseevna a year after her confinement in the Novodevichy Convent... (canvas, oil on canvas, 201.8 × 145.3 cm, 1879, State Tretyakov Gallery)

That moment of this dramatic confrontation, when the dispute was replaced by violence, is depicted by Perov on his canvas. A little to the right of the center of the picture, with a cross in his hand, is Nikita Pustosvyat. To his right is the monk Sergius with a petition. On the floor, putting his hand to his cheek, on which Nikita "imprinted the cross," lies Archbishop Athanasius. In the left part of the canvas is Tsarevna Sophia Alekseevna, who has risen from her throne, angered by the insolent behavior of the Old Believers. Next to her is Patriarch Joachim, to whom Nikita Pustosvyat is rushing. In the background is Prince Ivan Khovansky. Standing to the right of Sophia is a young boyar: apparently, Prince Vasily Golitsyn.

Art historian Alla Vereshchagina wrote that "the composition is based on the opposition of the left and right parts of the painting: the dissenters and the official entourage of Sophia and the patriarch". Additionally, "the confusion of figures in the lower part of the painting is contrasted with the upper part the ruler rises above all". At the same time, in the original sketches, Tsarevna Sophia and Patriarch Joachim were intended to have approximately equal roles — forming a single group, they were at the same level, and the patriarch appeared even more active than Sophia. Discussing the composition of the final version of the painting, art historian Alexei Fedorov-Davydov noted that the artist had arrived at "the academic method of arrangement of figures on an oval, somewhat open in front, with filling the corners of the canvas with secondary groups".

Tsarevna Sophia, a young woman in brocade robes, stands out with her regal posture and proud gaze. Fearlessly, with wide-open eyes, she looks at the crowd of dissenters, "with that expression of cold, 'controlled' anger, which so distinguishes her mental state from that of Pustosvyat". Comparing this with Ilya Repin's painting Tsarevna Sophia Alexeevna a Year After Her Imprisonment in the Novodevichy Convent... (1879, State Tretyakov Gallery), art historian Nonna Yakovleva noted that Perov's image of Tsarevna Sophia is "a kind of antithesis to Repin's: she has the same strength of character, but noble; she is good-looking and bright even in anger," and "she stands above the battle, humbling it". Art historian Olga Lyaskovskaya wrote that Perov's female figures turned out to be the weakest, noting that perhaps he was planning to work further on the image of Sophia.

On the part of the Old Believers, the protagonist is Nikita Pustosvyat, "a disheveled, tempestuous figure, with a sharp beard sticking forward," in whose image "sounds the theme of fanaticism, devotion to the idea of self-destruction". Art historian Leonid Diterikhs noted that the figure of Pustosvyat "alone could be a whole painting"; according to him, "in the entire Russian school of painting, one cannot find another like it, where the character of this fanatic of the schism is so strikingly and truly unraveled". Pustosvyat is depicted as a native of the people, from the poor provincial clergy. He is dressed in a shabby cassock, under which his thin shoulders are visible, and the priestly nature is indicated only by the epitrachil worn around his neck. He wears bast shoes and puttees, and with one foot, he steps on a newly printed "corrected" book. He is all in motion — one hand holds the eight-pointed cross, and the other is pulled back, as if preparing to strike a blow. Perov worked extensively on the images of other dissenters, among which critics noted the clergyman standing on the right with an icon in his hands, an old man pointing to the scroll, as well as the dissenter depicted at the very right edge of the canvas, looking out from behind the shooter.

The attitude of the author of the canvas toward the image of Nikita Pustosvyat remains unclear; it seems that the artist is an impartial spectator of the event he depicts. In this fight, "one thing is clear — the irreconcilability of the parties, the futility of the dispute, and, at the same time, the impotence of protest against state power". The painting portrays "a desperate duel of strong characters, which can be resolved only by catastrophe — the death of the protagonist". So it happened in reality: Sophia could not tolerate the existence of an opponent-preacher so fanatically devoted to his ideas and beliefs, and soon after the dispute about faith, Nikita Pustosvyat was captured by the Streltsy and beheaded.

== Sketches and studies ==
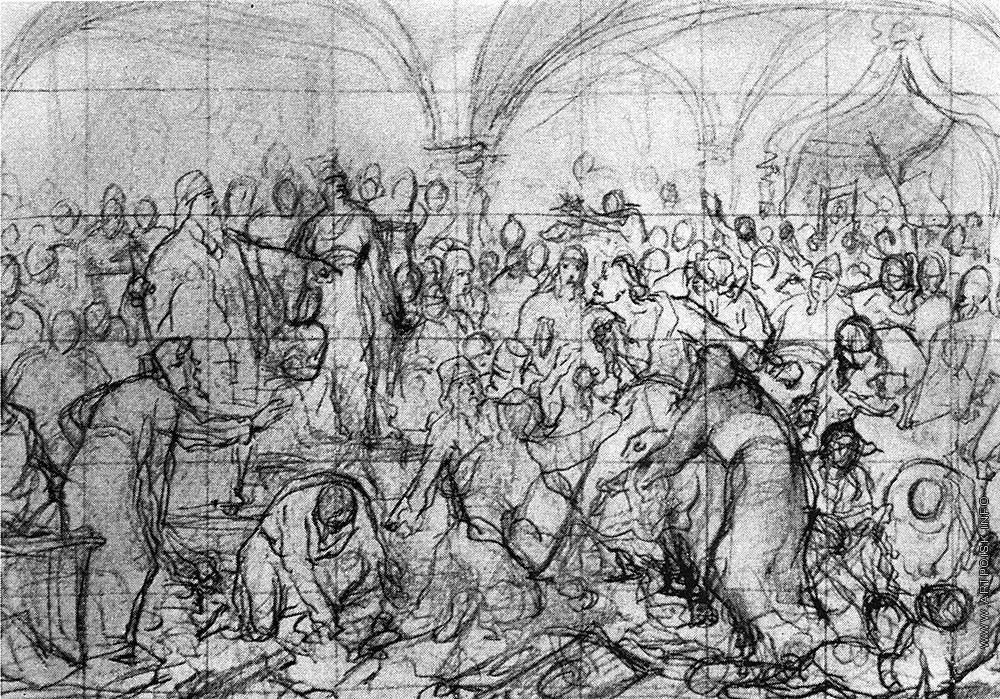
V. G. Perov. Nikita Pustosvyat. Debate about faith (sketch, paper on cardboard, pencil, 15.3 × 23 cm, 1880, State Tretyakov Gallery)

The inventory of Perov's works, published by Nikolai Sobko in 1899, mentioned five drawings created by the artist while working on the painting Nikita Pustosvyat, as well as "heads from the same place, 2 sheets" (all these sketches and studies are dated 1880). According to the information given, most of these drawings were in the possession of the artist Vladimir Perov (son of Vasily Grigorievich), and a smaller part in the Moscow collection of A. I. Balk. One of the graphic sketches was later transferred to the collection of the Tretyakov Gallery: Nikita Pustosvyat. Debate about Faith (paper on cardboard, pencil, 15.3 × 23 cm, 1880).

The list compiled by Nikolai Sobko also mentioned a pictorial sketch for the painting Nikita Pustosvyat, dated 1881 and located "at Mr. Sorokoumovsky, in Moscow" (apparently referring to one of the representatives of the famous merchant family Sorokoumovsky).

== Reviews and critics ==
The writer Nikolai Leskov, in a letter to Nikolai Alexandrov, editor of Khudozhestvenny Zhurnal, noted that from his point of view as a man who "somewhat understands the history of the schism0", Vasily Perov's painting Nikita Pustosvyat represents "an amazing fact of artistic penetration." In this case, according to Leskov, what is meant is "penetration into the most intimate essence of the historical moment which it depicts". Art historian Leonid Diterikhs, a member of the Russian Academy of Sciences, said that the painting is "a marvelous fact of artistic penetration." Despite the incompleteness of the painting, Diterikhs wrote that Nikita Pustosvyat is one of the strongest canvases in Russian historical painting, both in terms of "penetration" (as Leskov put it) and from the standpoint of technique and colors.

In 1887, comparing Surikov's Boyaryna Morozova with Perov's Nikita Pustosvyat, art critic Vladimir Stasov wrote that Perov had "not only one crowd, excited, rebellious, rumbling storm, but also soloists, colossal singers," which, in his opinion, primarily includes Nikita Pustosvyat himself — "turbulent, passionate, irritated, loudly and unbridledly reproaching everyone for apostasy," as well as standing a little behind him "his comrade, with a large icon in his hands, also a schismatic fanatic, but imperturbable and unshakable, like granite, like a rock, which will break all the seething waves of enemies and friends". Stasov highly appreciated this painting and believed that "Surikov remained far behind Perov and the two main actors in his picture". At the same time, however, Stasov recognized that Perov poorly succeeded, in his view, in "multisyllabic" scenes, and that the entire left side of the picture "is already completely devoid of any talent, characterization, and truth".

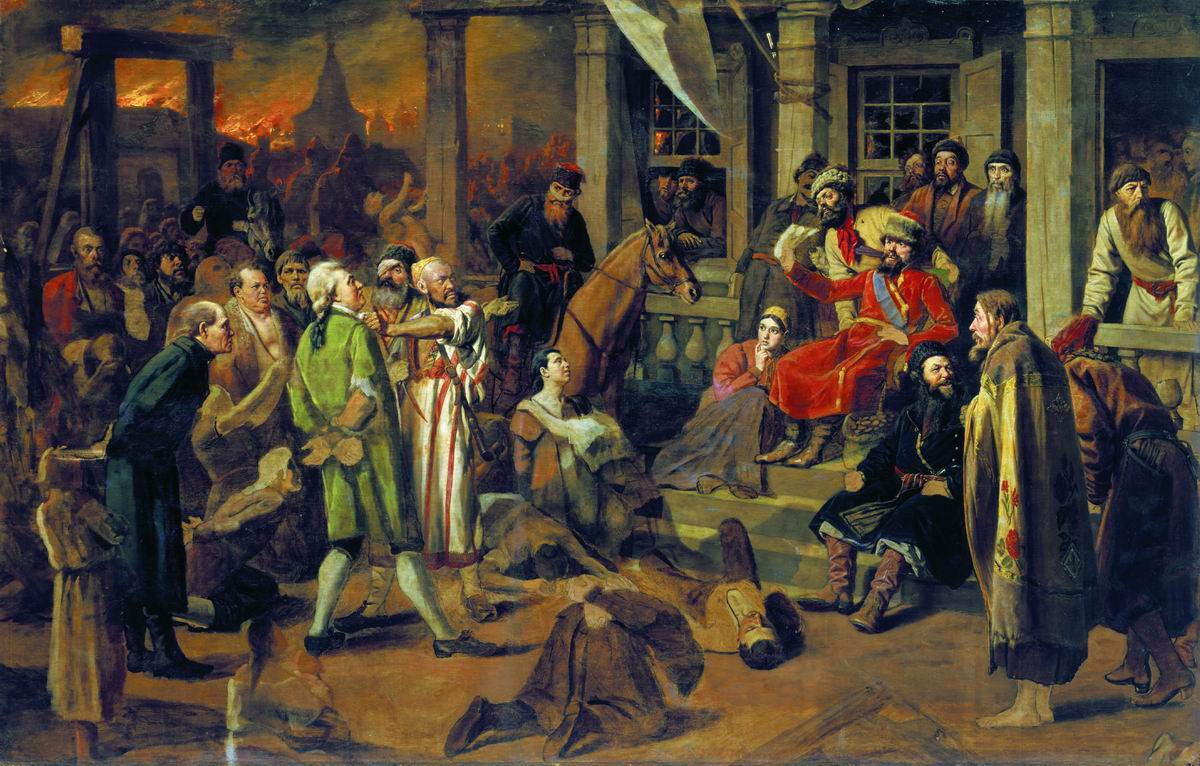
V. G. Perov. Pugachev's Court (canvas, oil on canvas, 150 × 238 cm, 1875, State Historical Museum)

In Soviet times, historical works from Vasily Perov's late period were sharply criticized, and his views on history and religion were regarded as reactionary. In addition to Nikita Pustosvyat, his other painting, Pugachev's Court (1875, State Historical Museum), was also included in this critique. In a monograph on Perov, published in 1934 to mark the centenary of the artist's birth, art historian Alexei Fedorov-Davydov called these paintings unsuccessful and eclectic, and wrote that the treatment of the schism in Nikita Pustosvyat is as reactionary as the treatment of the peasant revolution in Pugachev's Court. Along with Perov, Fedorov-Davydov criticized and supported Nikolai Leskov, who appreciated the representation of the schismatics as blind fanatics and intriguers, and Sophia as the embodiment of "wise and powerful state power of autocracy". Noting that Perov's paintings are among the most psychological in Russian history painting of the 1870s, Fedorov-Davydov wrote that "psychologism, growing in Perov's work, by the end of his life becomes a tool for expressing reactionary content".

Art historian Vladislav Zimenko generally also considered the painting Nikita Pustosvyat unsuccessful, nevertheless recognizing the expressiveness of a number of images presented in it. Among these, he singled out the expressive figure of Nikita Pustosvyat — "a passionate, dry face with a sharp, sharply protruding forward beard angrily turned to the opponents of the 'true faith'." According to Zimenko, the artist himself felt the imperfection of his last paintings, repeatedly revising them, and sometimes even destroying the finished versions.

Art historian Vladimir Obukhov noted that, in working on the images of Nikita Pustosvyat and his comrades, Vasily Perov showed himself as one of the creators of the concept of the historical hero — "active, responsible for each of his actions, ready to give his own life for his beliefs". According to Obukhov, the painting's achievements include "historicism, which permeates its entire figurative structure." He observed that in Nikita Pustosvyat, historical character is present not only in the setting but also in the images of Streltsy, monks, and schismatics — "these are not dressed-up actors, but alive and psychologically authentic historical types." Obukhov considered the main drawback of the painting to be "the complete absence of lively author's intonations," noting the artist's detached position in relation to what is depicted in the picture – positive phenomena are calmly stated by him, and there is no direct condemnation of negative aspects. Among other shortcomings, Obukhov mentioned the conspicuous rigidity of the painting, "some compositional discord," as well as the conventionality of the images of some characters — in particular, Tsarevna Sophia and Archbishop Athanasius.

Discussing works on historical and religious themes created by Perov in the last decade of his life, art historian Vladimir Lenyashin noted that in general they were not properly appreciated in artistic circles. As an exception, Lenyashin cited the opinion of artist Nikolai Ge, who believed that in transitioning from ordinary genre to religious, and then to historical themes, Perov's talent "developed, and he rose higher and higher." Highly praising the paintings Pugachev's Court and Nikita Pustosvyat. Debate about Faith, Ge noted that Perov "moved on to history and did only two things, which he did not finish, but which were of tremendous importance". According to Lenyashin, "without overestimating these works, one should not bypass them".

== Bibliography ==
- Антоненко, С. Г. (1996). «Мы пришли не о грамматике с тобой говорить…» Староверы и власть на полотне Василия Перова (in Russian). Родина. pp. 40–43.
- Верещагина, А. Г. (1988). Некоторые проблемы исторической живописи В. Г. Перова (in Russian). Советское искусствознание. pp. 212–238.
- Дитерихс, Л. К. (1893). В. Г. Перов. Его жизнь и художественная деятельность (in Russian). СПб.: Типография Ю. Н. Эрлиха. p. 80.
- Зименко, В. М. (1948). Василий Григорьевич Перов. 1834—1882 (in Russian). М.—Л.: Искусство. p. 43.
- Кеменов, В. С. (1987). В. И. Суриков: Историческая живопись, 1870—1890 (in Russian). М.: Искусство. p. 568.
- Королёва, С. (2009). Василий Григорьевич Перов (Великие художники, том 17) (in Russian). М.: Директмедиа Паблишинг и Комсомольская правда. p. 48. ISBN 978-5-87107-202-8.
- Леняшин, В. А. (1987). Василий Григорьевич Перов (in Russian). Л.: Художник РСФСР. p. 248.
- Леонов, А. И. (1959). Василий Григорьевич Перов. Мастера русского искусства (in Russian). М.: Государственное издательство изобразительного искусства. p. 60.
- Лесков, Н. С. (1887). О картине «Никита Пустосвят» (in Russian). Художественный журнал. pp. 293–295.
- Лясковская, О. А. (1979). В. Г. Перов: Особенности творческого пути художника (in Russian). М.: Искусство. p. 174.
- Нестеров, М. В. (1986). Давние дни: воспоминания, очерки, письма (in Russian). Уфа: Башкирское книжное издательство. p. 559.
- Новицкий, А. П. (1902). Перов Василий Григорьевич // Русский биографический словарь: Павел преподобный — Петр (Илейка) / под наблюдением А. А. Половцова (in Russian). Vol. 13. СПб.: Типография И. Н. Скороходова. pp. 551–560.
- Обухов, В. М. (1983). В. Г. Перов (in Russian). М.: Изобразительное искусство. p. 112.
- Собко, Н. П. (1899). Перов Василий Григорьевич // Словарь русских художников с древнейших времён до наших дней (XI—XIX вв.) (in Russian). Vol. III. СПб.: Типография М. М. Стасюлевича. pp. 73–173.
- Соловьёв, С. М. (1962). История России с древнейших времён. Vol. 13 (book VII). М.
- Стасов, В. В. (1937). Избранные сочинения / С. Н. Гольдштейн. Vol. 1. М.: Искусство.
- Стасов, В. В. (1950). Избранное: живопись, скульптура, графика (in Russian). Vol. 1 — Русское искусство. М.: Искусство.
- Фёдоров-Давыдов, А. А. (1934). В. Г. Перов (in Russian). М.: Государственное издательство изобразительных искусств. p. 355.
- Яковлева, Н. А. (2005). Историческая картина в русской живописи. Энциклопедия мирового искусства (in Russian). М.: Белый город. p. 656. ISBN 5-7793-0898-5
- Государственная Третьяковская галерея — каталог собрания / Я. В. Брук, Л. И. Иовлева (in Russian). Vol. 4: Живопись второй половины XIX века, книга 2, Н—Я. М.: Красная площадь. 2006. p. 560. ISBN 5-900743-22-5
- Государственный Русский музей — Живопись, XVIII — начало XX века (каталог) (in Russian). Л.: Аврора и Искусство. 1980. p. 448.
- Иллюстрированный каталог Художественного отдела Всероссийской выставки в Москве, 1882 г. / Н. П. Собко (in Russian) (СПб. ed.). Издатель М. П. Боткин. 1882. p. 304.
- Николай Николаевич Ге: письма, статьи, критика, воспоминания современников / Н. Ю. Зограф (in Russian). М.: Искусство. 1978. p. 399.
- Переписка И. Н. Крамского: И. Н. Крамской и П. М. Третьяков, 1869—1887 / С. Н. Гольдштейн (in Russian). М.: Искусство. 1953. p. 458.
