= Yevdokia Alekseyevna of Russia =

Yevdokia Alekseyevna
- Tsarevna of Russia
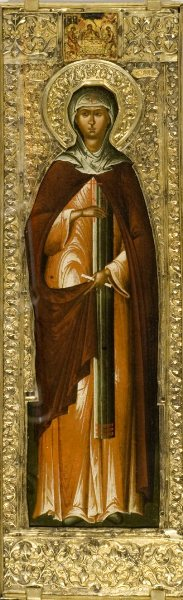
- Born: Евдокия Алексеевна; 17 February 1650; Moscow
- Died: 10 May 1712 (aged 62); Moscow
- Burial: Novodevichy Convent
- House: Romanov
- Father: Alexis of Russia
- Mother: Maria Miloslavskaya

Tsarevna Yevdokia Alekseyevna (Russian: Евдокия Алексеевна; 17 February 1650 - 10 May 1712) was the eldest daughter of Tsar Alexis of Russia and Maria Miloslavskaya, sister of Tsar Feodor III of Russia and Tsar Ivan V of Russia and half-sister of Tsar Peter the Great.

== Biography ==
Like many other Tsarevnas of her time, Yevdokia was educated and literate. She lived a secluded life in the terem and little is known about her earlier years. She could be described as mild, reserved and studious, and devoted to serving her family and kingdom. She was passionate about her education, and a very bright student.

In 1669, when Yevdokia was 19 years of age her mother Maria died in child-bed.Two years later, Yevodokia's father remarried to Natalia Naryshkina. Alexis I died in 1676.

As it was forbidden for a subject to marry one of the tsar's daughters and no marriage with suitable royalty of equal rank could be found she never married. Instead she served her kingdom and Orthodoxy with compassion and grace. She has no known offspring, and it can be assumed that she served in a convent for some time. She died with not much of a legacy behind her, and her name is not remembered often.
