= Maria Alekseyevna of Russia =

Maria Alekseyevna
- Tsarevna of Russia
- Born: Мари́я Алексе́евна; 18 January 1660; Moscow
- Died: 9 March 1723; Saint Petersburg
- Burial: Saints Peter and Paul Cathedral, Saint Petersburg
- House: Romanov
- Father: Alexis of Russia
- Mother: Maria Miloslavskaya

Tsarevna Maria Alekseyevna (Russian: Мари́я Алексе́евна; 18 January 1660 - 9 March 1723) was a Russian Princess, daughter of Tsar Alexis of Russia and Maria Miloslavskaya, sister of Tsar Feodor III of Russia and Tsar Ivan V of Russia and half sister of Tsar Peter the Great.

== Life ==
Maria Alekseyevna, born in Moscow, was named in honor of her mother, Maria Miloslavskaya.

Maria Alekseyevna did not actively participate in the political plots of the Kremlin, but her open passive sympathy for Tsarevna Sophia Alekseyevna, Eudoxia Lopukhina and Alexei Petrovich, Tsarevich of Russia made her relationship with Tsar Peter I tense. She maintained contact with Eudoxia Lopukhina after Eudoxia had been placed in a convent, and passed messages and money between Eudoxia and her son Alexei Petrovich. When Alexei Petrovich left Russia in 1716, she encountered him on the way and conveyed a letter from him to his mother. After the arrest of Alexei in 1718, Maria was taken into custody and accused of having assisted his escape. She was imprisoned in Shlisselburg and then placed under house arrest in Saint Petersburg. She was released in 1721.

Maria Alexeyevna outlived all of her sisters and died in 1723, two years before the death of her half-brother. She was buried in the Saints Peter and Paul Cathedral, Saint Petersburg.
