= Tsarevich Simeon Alexeyevich of Russia =

Russian prince, son of prince Alexei Mikhailovich and Maria Miloslavskaya

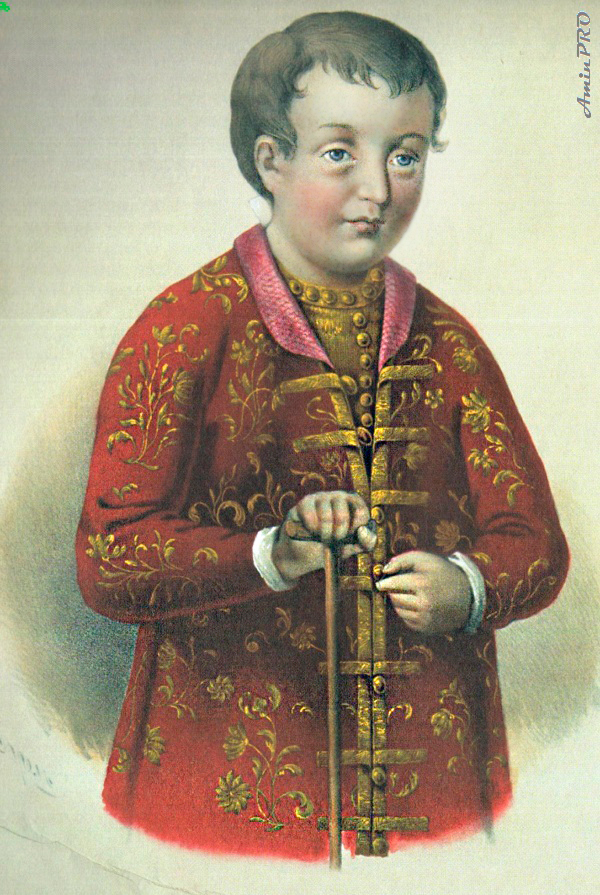
Tsarevich Simeon Alexeyevich of Russia

Tsarevich Simeon Alexeyevich (Russian: Симеон Алексеевич; 3 April 1665 - 18 June 1669) was the fourth son of Tsar Alexis of Russia and Maria Miloslavskaya, brother of Tsar Feodor III of Russia and Tsar Ivan V of Russia and half-brother of Tsar Peter the Great.

In 1673, after his death, a pretender appeared at the Zaporizhian Sich, claiming to be Tsarevich Simeon. The pretender claimed that he had sought refuge with Stenka Razin after boyars had attempted to kill him. The pretender was executed on 17 September 1674.
