= Marfa Alekseyevna of Russia =

Marfa Alekseyevna
- Tsarevna of Russia
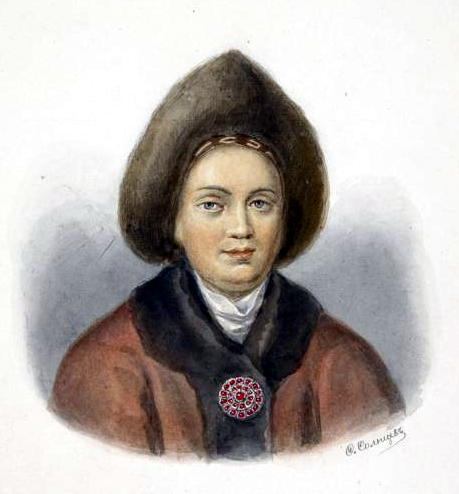
- Tsarevna Marfa Alekseyevna of Russia
- Born: 26 August 1652; Moscow
- Died: 19 June 1707 (aged 54)
- Burial: Alexandrov Kremlin
Names
- Russian: Марфа Алексеевна
- House: Romanov
- Father: Alexis of Russia
- Mother: Maria Miloslavskaya

Tsarevna Marfa Alekseyevna Romanova of Russia (Russian: Марфа Алексеевна; 26 August 1652 – 19 June 1707) was a Russian princess, daughter of Tsar Alexis of Russia and Maria Miloslavskaya, sister of Tsar Feodor III of Russia and Tsar Ivan V of Russia and half-sister of Tsar Peter the Great. She participated in the rebellion of her sister Sophia against Tsar Peter in 1698.

Marfa was one of six daughters of Tsar Alexis of Russia, along with her sisters Evdokia, Sofia, Ekaterina, Maria, and Feodosia. Unusually for the time and place, the Tsar wished his daughters to be well-educated and politically aware.

In the Streltsi rebellion, rebels had planned to depose Peter the Great and place Sophia, his sister, on the throne. Sophia, who had been regent during Peter's youth, was willing to cooperate and become ruler, and Marfa, who evidently knew of the plot, supported her. Peter got wind of the plan, and launched a massive, vicious investigation. Hundreds of people were tortured and executed, and, though Sofia and Marfa avoided that fate (as it was deemed improper to torture his sisters), Peter the Great punished them by forcing them to become nuns, and confining them in a convent. Marfa was imprisoned in the Convent of the Assumption (Ouspienski), and took the name Margaret. She died at the convent eight years later.
