= Catherine of Russia =

Catherine of Russia can refer to:

- Catherine I of Russia (1684–1727), second wife of Peter the Great
- Catherine II of Russia (1729–1796), called Catherine the Great, wife of Peter III of Russia
- Maria Buynosova-Rostovskaya, born Ekaterina (d. 1626), second wife of Vasili IV of Russia
- Tsarevna Catherine Alekseyevna of Russia (1658–1718), daughter of Alexis I of Russia
- Tsarevna Catherine Ivanovna of Russia (1691–1733), daughter of Ivan V of Russia
- Ekaterina Alekseyevna Dolgorukova (1712–1747), fiancée of Peter II of Russia
- Grand Duchess Catherine Antonovna of Russia (1741–1807), sister of Ivan IV of Russia, imprisoned with family by Empress Elizabeth
- Catherine Pavlovna of Russia (1788–1819), daughter of Paul I of Russia, wife of Duke George of Oldenburg and later William I of Württemberg
- Grand Duchess Catherine Mikhailovna of Russia (1827–1894), daughter of Grand Duke Michael Pavlovich of Russia, wife of Duke Georg August of Mecklenburg-Strelitz
- Catherine of Russia (film), a 1963 French-Italian film
