= Catherine Alekseyevna of Russia =

Catherine Alekseyevna
- Tsarevna of All Russia
- Born: Екатерина Алексеевна; 27 November 1658; Moscow
- Died: 1 May 1718; Moscow
- Burial: Novodevichy Convent
- House: Romanov
- Father: Alexis of Russia
- Mother: Maria Miloslavskaya

Tsarevna Catherine Alekseyevna (Russian: Екатерина Алексеевна; 27 November 1658 – 1 May 1718) was the fifth daughter of Tsar Alexis of Russia and Maria Miloslavskaya. She was also the sister of Tsar Feodor III of Russia and Tsar Ivan V of Russia, and the half-sister of Tsar Peter the Great.

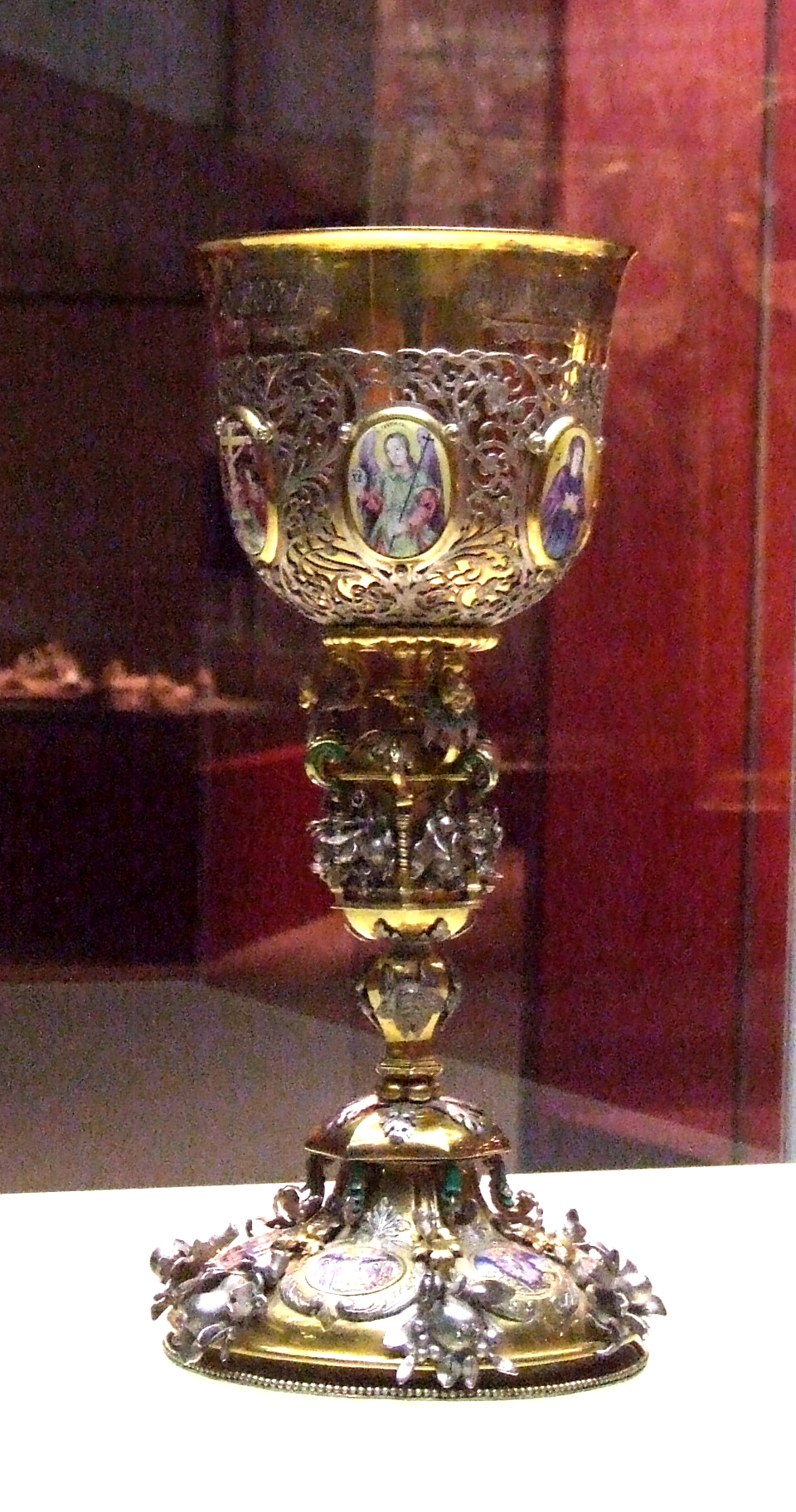
Contribution of Princess Ekaterina Alekseevna to the Smolensk Cathedral of the Novodevichy Convent.

Catherine was named after Saint Catherine of Alexandria. In accordance with the Muscovite custom for imperial princesses, she lived in seclusion and never married. During the Moscow uprising of 1682, however, Ivan Andreyevich Khovansky (Tararui) is alleged to have planned to marry Catherine to his son Andrey Ivanovich Khovanskii in order to place him on the throne.

Catherine Alekseyevna seems to have been supportive of Westernized reforms of Russia; while Russian princesses were expected to live in seclusion and screen completely from being seen by men, she was evidently seen in public in 1683, as a witness from that year reported how she did not wear the traditional clothes, but dressed in Polish costume and did not wear her hair in traditional braids.

In 1698, Catherine was interrogated for potential involvement in the Streltsy Uprising on the tsar Peter the Great, but released after it had been established that she had nothing to do with it. According to contemporaries, she was the only one of the half-sisters of tsar Peter the Great never to have angered him, because she never involved herself in politics. She participated in the Orthodox baptism of Catherine I of Russia.

In 1716, however, she was briefly suspected by the tsar of being involved in a conspiracy because of her nightly walks with her steward Bogdanov, who was exiled to Siberia.
