= Maria Miloslavskaya =

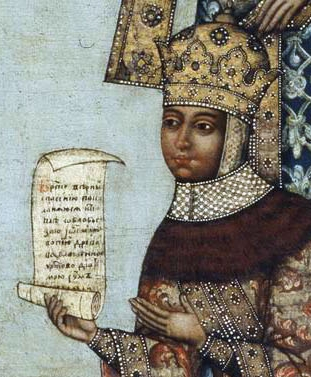
- Depiction in a 1670s icon of the True Cross

Tsaritsa consort of All Russia
- Tenure: 16 January 1648 – 18 August 1669
- Predecessor: Eudoxia Streshneva
- Successor: Natalya Naryshkina
- Born: 1 April 1624; Moscow, Russia
- Died: 18 August 1669 (aged 45); Moscow, Russia
- Burial: Ascension Convent; Archangel Cathedral (1929)
- Spouse: Alexis of Russia (m. 1648)
- Issue among others...: Tsarevich Dmitri Alexeevich; Tsarevna Yevdokia Alekseevna; Tsarevna Marfa Alekseyevna; Tsarevich Alexei Alexeevich; Sofia Alexeevna, Regent of Russia; Tsarevna Ekaterina Alexeevna; Tsarevna Maria Alexeevna; Fyodor III; Tsarevna Feodosia Alexeyevna; Tsarevich Simeon Alexeyevich; Ivan V
Names
- Maria Ilyinichna Miloslavskaya
- House: Miloslavsky (by birth); Romanov (by marriage)
- Father: Ilya Danilovich Miloslavsky
- Mother: Ekaterina Feodorovna Narbekova
- Religion: Eastern Orthodox

Maria Ilyinichna Miloslavskaya (Russian: Мария Ильинична Милославская, 1 April 1624 – 18 August 1669) was tsaritsa of Russia as the first wife of tsar Alexis of Russia. She was the mother of tsar Feodor III of Russia, tsar Ivan V of Russia, and princess regent Sophia Alekseyevna.

== Life ==
Maria Ilyinichna Miloslavskaya was a younger daughter of the noble Ilya Danilovich Miloslavsky (d. 1668) and his wife, Ekaterina Fedorovna Narbekova. Her father was a relative and supporter of Boris Morozov, the influential tutor and favorite of the tsar.

=== Marriage ===
In 1647, tsar Alexis I of Russia reached the age required for marriage. The tsar was to choose his bride from a bride-show of hundreds of daughters of the nobility, who were summoned to the imperial court for selection. (This method to select a bride for the tsar reportedly originated from the reign of Ivan III, whose spouse Sophia Palaiologina came from the Byzantine Empire, where this method had once been used to choose a bride for the Byzantine emperor.)

The bridal selection of Alexis I was managed by Boris Morozov, and gathered together almost two hundred daughters of the nobility, among them Maria Miloslavskaya. She had the support of Boris Morozov, who intended to marry her sister Anna Miloslavskaya, and hoped that Alexis I would choose Maria, which would make him the brother-in-law of the tsar. During the selection ceremony, however, the tsar chose Euphemia Fedorovna Vsevolozhskaya by presenting her with a handkerchief and a ring as a symbol of their engagement. Boris Morozov then bribed a courtier to make Vsevolozhskaya faint; he then bribed a court physician to diagnose her with epilepsy. This disqualified Vsevolozhskaya as tsaritsa and resulted in both her and her father being exiled - accused of attempting to hide her illness from the tsar, and thus the first choice of the tsar was annulled.

Maria Miloslavskaya was selected as the tsar's second choice. She was reportedly a beauty, and was declared perfectly healthy after an examination by a court physician. The wedding took place on 16 January 1648 in Moscow. Upon the advice of the tsar's confessor, the wedding was a very somber ceremony, excluding all music, games and other festivities except for religious singing, to follow the wish of the famously ascetic Patriarch Joseph of Moscow. Ten days after the wedding of the tsar to Maria Miloslavskaya, Boris Morozov married her sister Anna Miloslavskaya, making him brother-in-law to the tsar and strengthening his power at court. Her father, additionally, was made a boyar and became one of the most influential power-holders at court, making the Miloslavsky family a key power clan at the Russian court during Maria's tenure as tsaritsa.

=== Tsaritsa ===
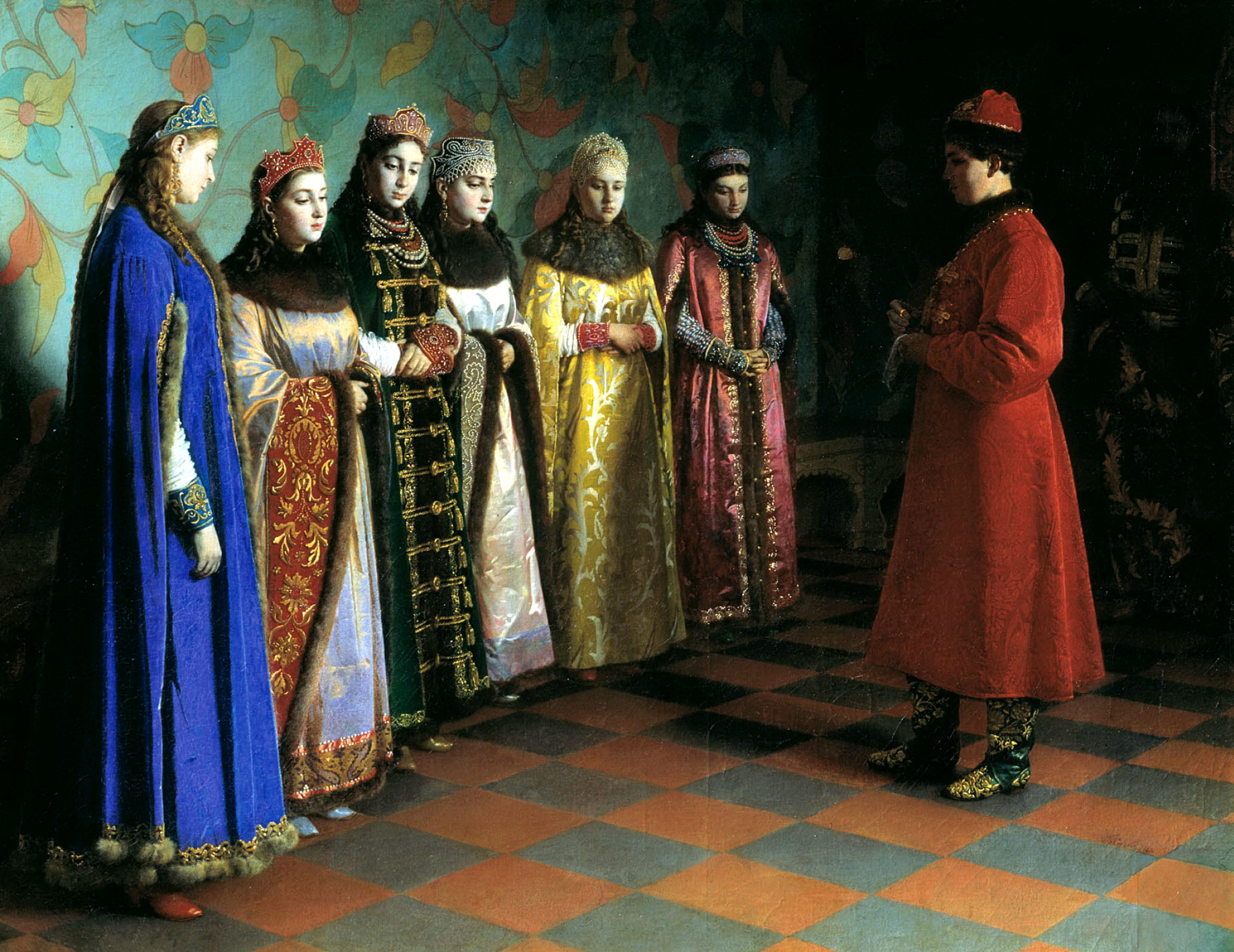
Tsar Alexei chooses his bride by Grigory Sedov, depicts Alexis I selecting Maria Miloslavskaya as his tsaritsa.

The marriage between tsar Alexis of Russia and tsaritsa Maria Miloslavskaya is described as a happy one. During the Moscow uprising of 1648, which followed the wedding, she evacuated with the tsar to Kolomenskoye.

Tsaritsa Maria was described as beautiful, but there was also a rumor that Maria was a witch with a goat foot who could master sorcery.

In contemporary Moscovian Russia, the role of the tsaritsa was semi-public; all Russian noblewomen were expected to live their lives in seclusion, with as little contact with men as possible. Russian noblewomen did not socialize with male guests in their home, only meeting them for a ceremonial welcome before retiring without socializing with them; they traveled in covered sleighs and carriages when outside, and even the royal women, when visiting the church or participating in official processions, only did so covered by screens. Despite this, however, the tsaritsa was expected to embody an ideal of female Orthodox devotion and, outside of her religious duties, manage the affairs of the court staff and participate in public charitable and religious activity.

Tsaritsa Maria fulfilled her expected role both in regard to charity and religion. She engaged in charity public donations to the Moscow city hospitals for the poor sick and disabled, and supported the work of Fyodor Rtishchev. She acted as the protector of the cult of Mary of Egypt, and favored the Sretensky Monastery (Moscow). In 1651–1652, she commissioned an icon to the monastery. The saint favored by Maria was eventually to be regarded as a patron saint of the Romanov dynasty. She also benefited the Trinity Monastery Optina (Bolhov).

In 1654 and 1660, she gave audience to the Georgian queen Yelena Leonovna in the Tsarina's Golden Chamber. As the tsar was away at the time of the Moscow Plague of 1654–55, Maria took over and organized the measures taken by city authorities, giving the city officials order by correspondence so as not to break her seclusion, and herself evacuated with her children and her court to Kalyazin Abbey.

Maria died of the fever after having given birth, several months after her father. When she died, it was first believed that her widower would never remarry.

== Issue ==
Alexei's first marriage to Miloslavskaya was harmonious and felicitous. They had thirteen children (five sons and eight daughters) in twenty-one years of marriage, and she died only weeks after her thirteenth childbirth. Four sons survived her (Alexei, Fyodor, Semyon, and Ivan), but within six months of her death, two of these were dead, including Alexei, the 15-year-old heir to the throne. The couple's children were:

- Tsarevich Dmitri Alexeevich (1648–1649); crown prince; died in infancy
- Tsarevna Yevdokia Alekseevna (1650–1712)
- Tsarevna Marfa Alekseyevna (1652–1707)
- Tsarevich Alexei Alexeevich (1654–1670); crown prince; died unwed aged 15
- Tsarevna Anna Alexeevna (1655–1659); died in infancy
- Tsarevna Sofia Alexeevna (1657–1704), regent of Russia (1682–89) for her two younger brothers; never married
- Tsarevna Ekaterina Alexeevna (1658–1718)
- Tsarevna Maria Alexeevna (1660–1723)
- Fyodor III (1661–1682); succeeded his father as Tsar of Russia; died childless
- Tsarevna Feodosia Alexeyevna (1662–1713)
- Tsarevich Simeon Alexeyevich (1665–1669); died in infancy
- Ivan V (1666–1696); was co-ruler along with his younger half-brother Peter the Great; father of Empress Anna
- Tsarevna Yevdokia Alexeevna (1669–1669)

Maria Miloslavskaya Miloslavsky Born: 1 April 1624 Died: 18 August 1669]]
Russian royalty
Vacant Title last held by Eudoxia Streshneva	Tsaritsa consort of Russia; 1648–1669	Vacant Title next held by Natalia Naryshkina
