= Tsarevich Dmitry Alexeyevich of Russia =

Russian tsarevich (1648–1649)

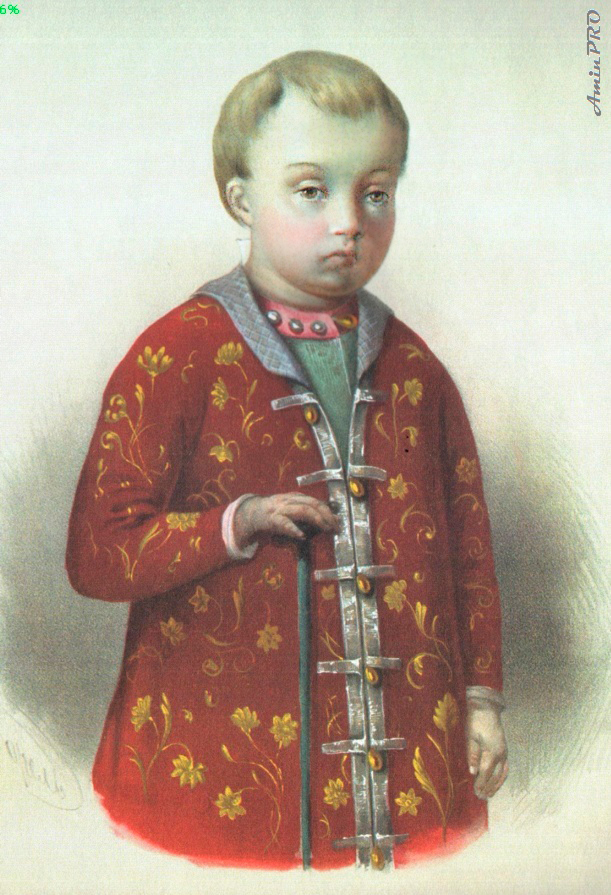
Later copy of a 17th-century portrait (parsuna)

Tsarevich Dmitry Alexeyevich (Russian: Дмитрий Алексеевич; 1 November [O.S. 22 October] 1648 – 16 October [O.S. 6 October] 1649) was the first son of Tsar Alexis of Russia by his first wife Maria Miloslavskaya.

== Biography ==
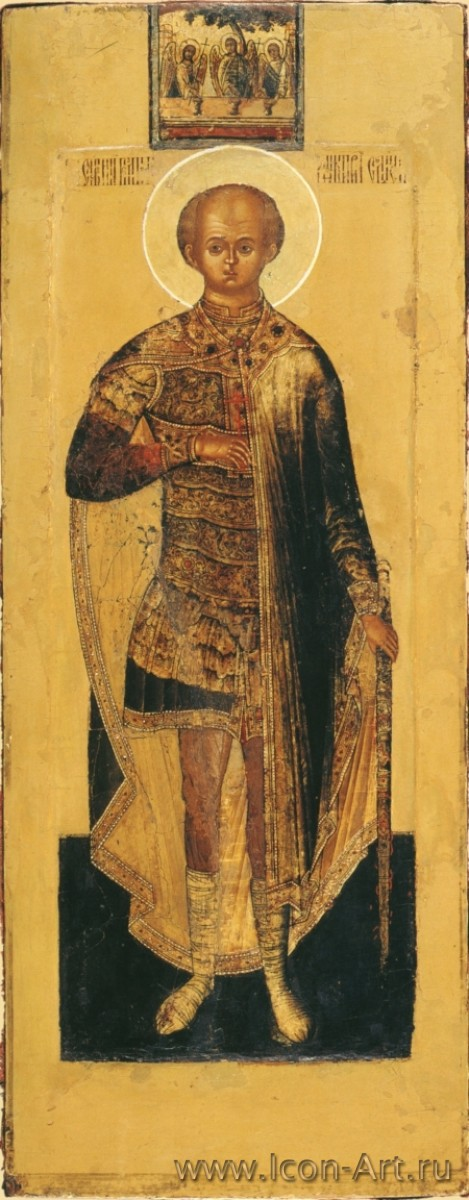
Princely icon of Dmitry, 1648

Dmitry was born on 1 November [O.S. 22 October] 1648, the day of the festival of the Mother of God of Kazan icon. He was the first son of Alexis of Russia by his first wife Maria Miloslavskaya, who married the tsar on 16 January (O.S.) the same year. His baptism took place on 29 October, with the officiating priest being Patriarch Joseph. The godmother of the tsarevich was Tsarevna Irina Mikhailovna and the godfather was archimandrite Adrian of the Trinity Lavra of St. Sergius.

He died suddenly a year later and was buried at the Cathedral of the Archangel in Moscow, Russia. The inscription on his tombstone says:

Лета 7158 октября в 6 день на память святаго апостола Фомы преставися государя царя и великого князя Алексея Михайловича всея Русии сын благоверный царевич князь Димитрий Алексеевич всея Русии в ночи в 11 часу с пятницы на суботу.

In the year 7158 [1649], on October 6, on the day commemorating the holy Apostle Thomas, the sovereign, tsar and grand prince Alexei Mikhailovich of all Russia lost his son, the pious tsarevich, prince Dmitry Alexeyevich of all Russia, at night at the eleventh hour from Friday to Saturday.

— Cathedral of the Archangel

== Sources ==
- Bushkovitch, Paul (18 March 2021). Succession to the Throne in Early Modern Russia: The Transfer of Power 1450–1725. Cambridge University Press. ISBN 978-1-108-80127-0.
