= Tsarevich Alexei Alexeyevich of Russia =

Alexei Alexeyevich
- Tsarevich of Russia
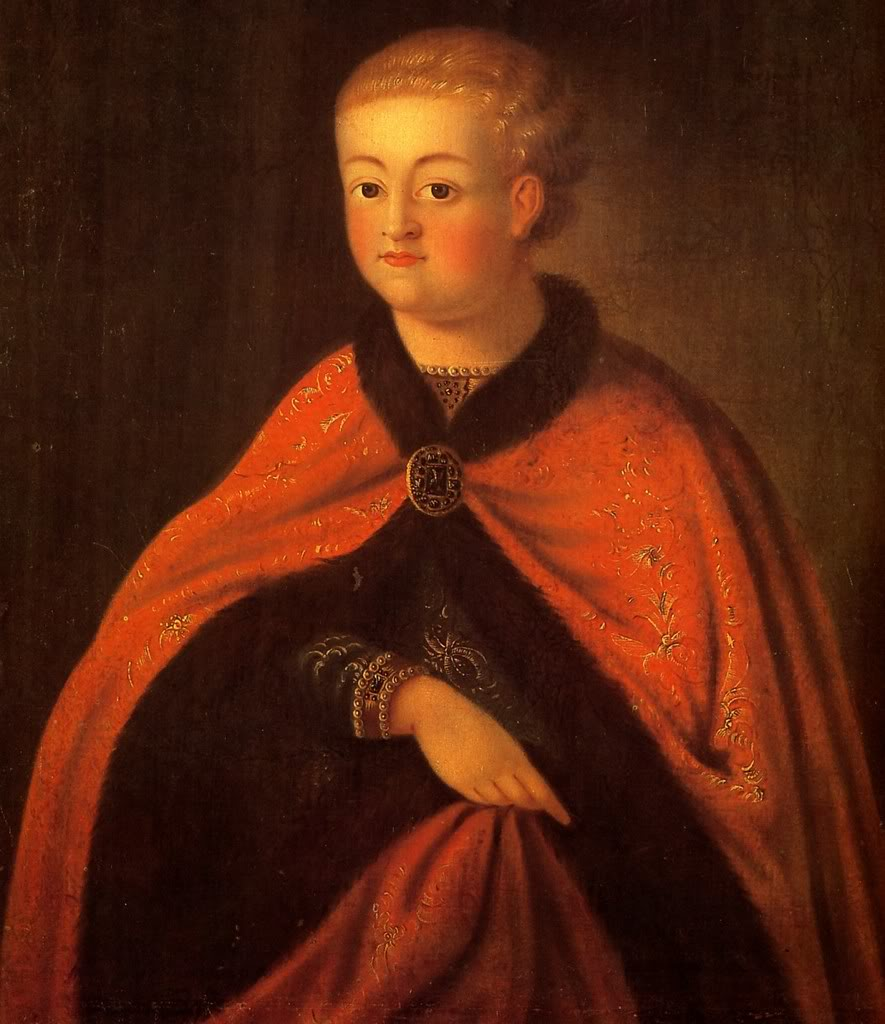
- Anonymous depiction of Alexei.
- Born: 15 February 1654; Moscow, Tsardom of Russia
- Died: 17 January 1670 (aged 15); Moscow, Tsardom of Russia
- Burial: Cathedral of the Archangel, Moscow
- House: Romanov
- Father: Alexis, Tsar of Russia
- Mother: Maria Miloslavskaya

Tsarevich Alexei Alexeyevich (Russian: Алексей Алексеевич, Aleksey Alekseyevich; 15 February 1654 – 17 January 1670) was the second son and heir of Tsar Alexis of Russia and Maria Miloslavskaya, brother of Tsar Feodor III, Tsar Ivan V, and Tsarevna Sophia and half-brother of Tsar Peter the Great.

== Biography ==
He was baptised with the same name "Alexey" as his father, but their namesake saints were different.

Among the Tsarevich's teachers was Symeon of Polotsk, who taught Alexei Latin and Polish; the prince also studied Slavic grammar, arithmetic and philosophy. For him, books and so-called "children's fun" (educational toys) were brought from abroad. He was distinguished, according to his contemporaries, by his great ability to learn, good memory and curiosity.

During the absence of the tsar in the capital (including his stay in the active army), he was considered the interim ruler of the Russian state; during this period, official letters were issued on his behalf.

He was considered a candidate for the Polish throne; his marriage to the niece of John II Casimir Vasa was planned, negotiations about this were carried out through the boyar Matveyev. Aleksey Alekseevich personally addressed the Polish ambassadors, who noted his good command of Latin and Polish.

On August 31 (September 10), 1656, the tsar's "charter" appeared, informing the officials that henceforth the tsar's son should be mentioned in all official documents as "the Great Sovereign, Tsarevich and Grand Duke Alexei Alekseevich." By that time, the "Great Sovereign" had not yet turned three years old. In 1667, Aleksey Alekseevich was solemnly and officially presented to the people as the future Tsar. In this regard, the royal charter said: “By the grace of the Almighty Glorified God in the Trinity, We, the Great Sovereign, have deigned to declare our Imperial Majesty the son of the blessed Tsarevich and Grand Duke Alexei Alekseevich to the people, and for that Our Sovereign and world joy, We have granted, The Great Sovereign, boyars and okolniks, and Duma people, and Moscow nobles, and tenants, and noblemen and children of boyar policemen, were ordered to fix the additions to the previous salaries according to the above articles. Then there was a transfer of who and how much is entitled to receive money by "royal favor".

== Death and Funerals ==
He died at 15 before he had a chance to succeed to the throne. In 1669 Alexei, his younger brother Feodor and their father were candidates for the Polish throne but none of the three were elected.

The royal notice said. “In the current 17 January 1670, at 7 o'clock in the afternoon, in the second quarter of an hour, on Monday, by the will of the Almighty Lord God, the Great Sovereign, Tsar and Grand Duke Alexei Mikhailovich, of all Great and Small and White Russia, the Autocrat, a prosperous industry, the son of His Sovereign, the Blessed Sovereign, Tsarevich and Grand Duke Alexei Alekseevich of all Great and Small and White Russia, from the life of his departure, and moved to the eternal bliss of the Heavenly Kingdom, from his birth in the 16th year”.

== Impostors ==
His name became the slogan of Stepan Razin's riot; The Razins announced that the prince had not died, but fled to them from the intrigues of the traitorous boyars. Around August 1670, the first false Alexei appeared, about whose real origin nothing is known. Razin's supporters called this impostor "Nechai" ("unexpected") and used this word as a battle cry. Later, already at the end of Razin's uprising, in August 1671, a second false Alexei appeared, who was actually the noble son of Ivan Kleopin, suffering from insanity.
