= Alexis of Russia =

Tsar of Russia from 1645 to 1676

Alexis
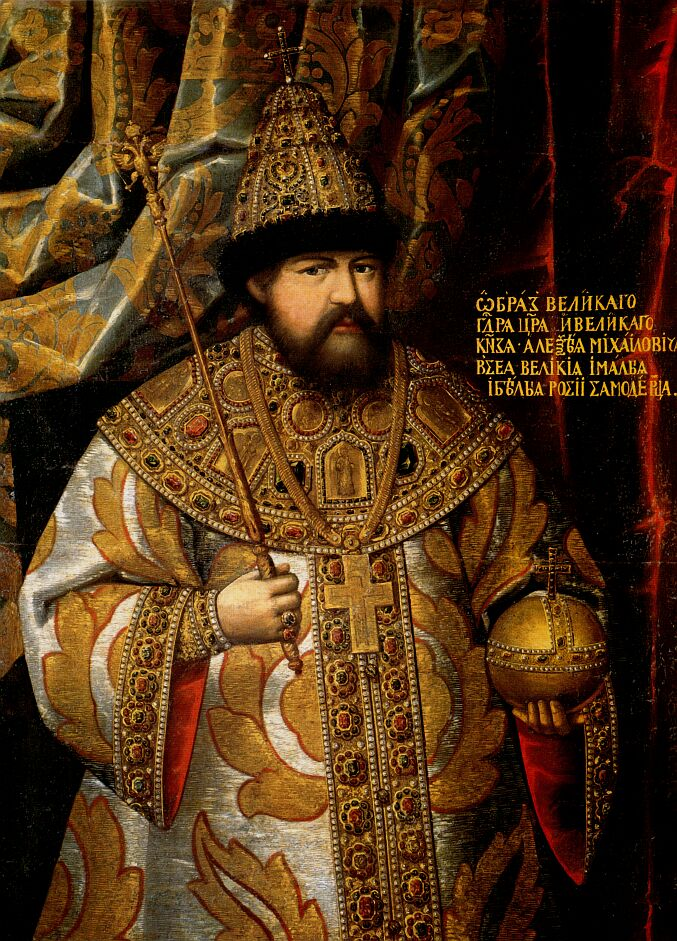
- Portrait by an unknown Russian artist, c. 1670 – c. 1680

Tsar of all Russia
- Reign: 23 July [O.S. 13 July] 1645 – 8 February [O.S. 29 January] 1676
- Coronation: 28 September 1645
- Predecessor: Michael I
- Successor: Feodor III
- Born: 19 March 1629; Moscow, Russia
- Died: 8 February 1676 (aged 46); Moscow, Russia
- Burial: Cathedral of the Archangel
- Spouse: Maria Ilyinichna Miloslavskaya (m. 1648; died 1669) Natalya Kirillovna Naryshkina (m. 1671)
- Issue among others...: Tsarevich Dmitri Alexeevich; Tsarevna Yevdokia Alekseevna; Tsarevna Marfa Alekseyevna; Tsarevich Alexei Alexeyevich; Tsarevna Sofia Alexeevna; Tsarevna Ekaterina Alexeevna; Tsarevna Maria Alexeevna; Feodor III; Tsarevna Feodosia Alexeyevna; Tsarevich Simeon Alexeyevich; Ivan V; Peter I; Tsarevna Natalya Alexeevna
Names
- Alexei Mikhailovich
- House: Romanov
- Father: Michael of Russia
- Mother: Eudoxia Streshneva
- Religion: Russian Orthodox

Alexei Mikhailovich (Note: In full Alexei Mikhailovich Romanov (Tishayshy) (Russian: Алексей Михайлович Романов (Тишайший), romanized: Aleksey Mikhaylovich Romanov (Tishayshy), lit. 'Alexei Mikhailovich Romanov, the Quietest')) (Russian: Алексей Михайлович, (Note: Pre-reform spelling: Алеѯі́й Мїха́иловичъ) IPA: [ɐlʲɪkˈsʲej mʲɪˈxajləvʲɪtɕ]; 19 March [O.S. 9 March] 1629 – 8 February [O.S. 29 January] 1676), also known as Alexis, was Tsar of all Russia from 1645 until his death in 1676. He was the second Russian tsar from the House of Romanov.

He was the first tsar to sign laws on his own authority and his council passed the Sobornoye Ulozheniye of 1649, which strengthened the bonds between autocracy and the lower nobility. In religious matters, he sided closely with Patriarch Nikon during the schism in the Russian Orthodox Church which saw unpopular liturgical reforms.

While finding success in foreign affairs, his reign saw several wars with Iran, Poland (from whom left-bank Ukraine and Smolensk were annexed) and Sweden, as well as internal instabilities such as the Salt Riot in Moscow and the Cossack revolt of Stenka Razin in southern Russia. At the time of his death, Russia spanned almost 8.1 million km^{2} (3.1 million mi^{2}).

== Early life and reign ==
Alexis was born on 19 March [O.S. 9 March] 1629, in Moscow, to Tsar Michael and Eudoxia Streshneva. At the age of sixteen, he acceded to the throne after his father's death on 12 July 1645. In August, the Tsar's mother died, and following a pilgrimage to Sergiyev Posad he was crowned on 28 September in the Dormition Cathedral. He was committed to the care of his tutor Boris Morozov, a shrewd boyar open to Western ideas.

Morozov pursued a peaceful foreign policy, securing a truce with the Polish–Lithuanian Commonwealth and carefully avoiding complications with the Ottoman Empire. His domestic policy aimed at limiting the privileges of foreign traders and abolishing useless and expensive court offices. On 17 January 1648, Morozov procured the marriage of the tsar with Maria Miloslavskaya, himself marrying her sister Anna ten days later; both were daughters of Ilya Danilovich Miloslavsky.

Alexis empowered Morozov to conduct reforms to reduce social tensions; however, his measure of tripling the tax burden (arrears for the two years preceding 1648 was demanded) caused heightened popular discontent. Morozov was regarded as a corrupt, self-seeking boyar and was accused of sorcery and witchcraft. In May 1648 Muscovites rose against his faction in the Salt Riot, and the young Tsar was compelled to dismiss them and exile Morozov to the Kirillo-Belozersky Monastery. Four months later, Morozov secretly returned to Moscow to regain some of his power.

The popular discontent demonstrated by the riot was partially responsible for Alexis' 1649 issuance of a new legal code, the Sobornoye Ulozheniye.

== Later reign ==
=== Military reform ===
In 1648, using the experience of creating regiments of the foreign system during the reign of his father, Alexis began reforming the army.

The main direction of the reform was the mass creation of New Order Regiments: Reiters, Soldiers, Dragoons and Hussars. These regiments formed the backbone of the new army of Tsar Alexis. To fulfill the reform goals, a large number of European military specialists were hired for service. This became possible because of the end of the Thirty Years' War, which created a colossal surplus of military professionals in Europe.

=== Rebellions ===
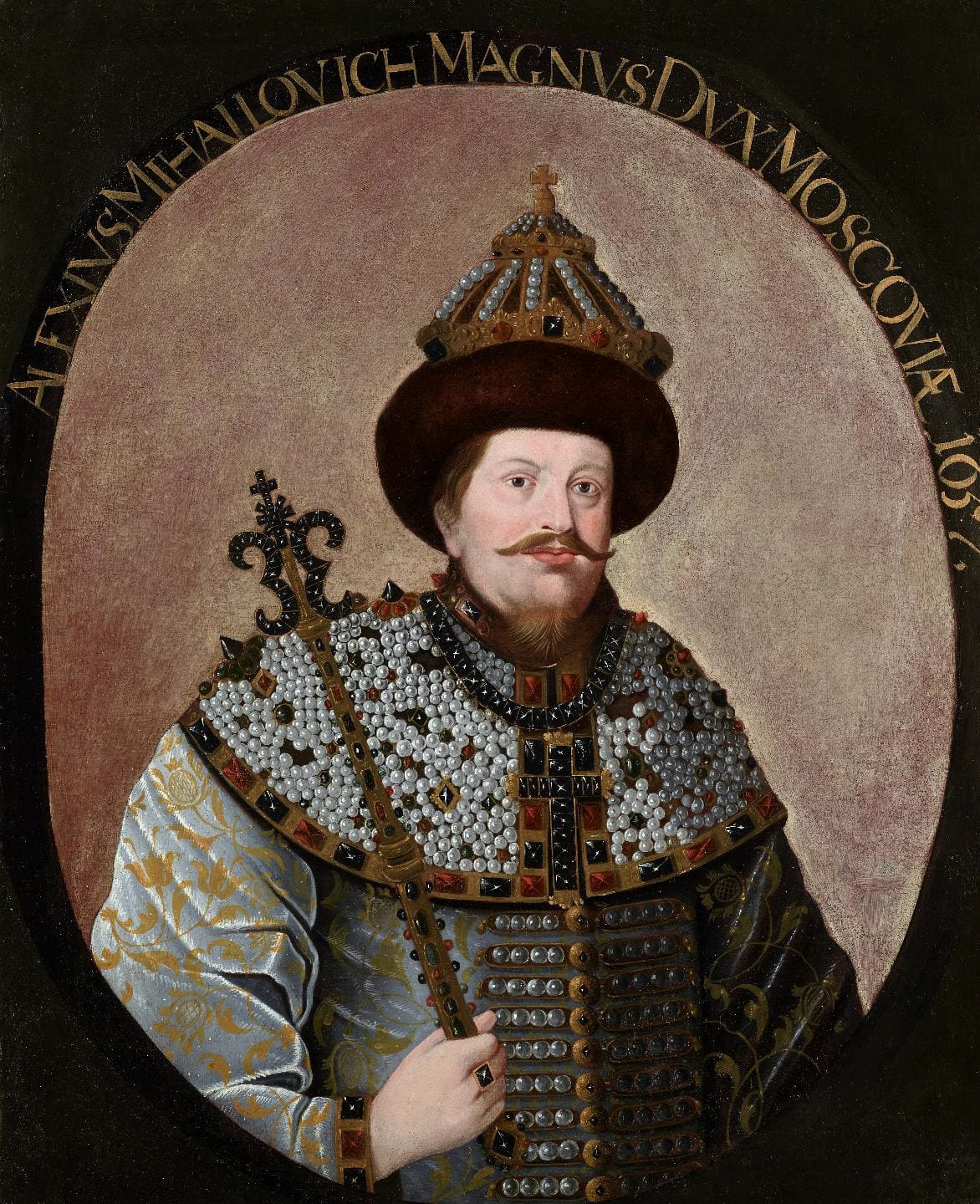
Portrait by a Polish painter, 1657

Throughout his reign, Alexis faced rebellions across Russia. After resolving the 1648 Salt Riot Alexis faced rebellions in 1650 in the cities of Pskov and Great Novgorod. Alexis put down the Novgorod rebellion quickly, but was unable to subdue Pskov, and was forced to promise the city amnesty in return for surrender. The Metropolitan Nikon distinguished himself at Great Novgorod and in 1651 became the Tsar's chief minister.

By the 1660s, Alexis's wars with Poland and Sweden had put an increasing strain on the Russian economy and public finances. In response, Alexis's government had begun minting large numbers of copper coins in 1654 to increase government revenue but this led to a devaluation of the ruble and a severe financial crisis. As a result, angry Moscow residents revolted in the 1662 Copper Riot, which was put down violently.

In 1669, the Cossacks along the Don in southern Russia erupted in rebellion. The rebellion was led by Stenka Razin, a disaffected Don Cossack who had captured the Russian terminus of Astrakhan. From 1670 to 1671, Razin seized multiple towns along the Volga river. The turning point in his campaign was his failed siege of Simbirsk in October 1670. Razin was finally captured on the Don in April 1671, and was drawn and quartered in Moscow.

=== War against Safavid Iran ===
In 1651, Safavid troops attacked Russian fortifications in the North Caucasus. The main issue involved the expansion of a Russian garrison on the Koy Su river, as well as the construction of several new fortresses, in particular the one built on the Iranian side of the Terek river. The successful Safavid offensive resulted in the destruction of the Russian fortress and its garrison being expelled. In 1653, Alexis, initially thinking about sending the Zaporozhian Cossacks, eventually decided to send an embassy to Persia for a peaceful settlement of the conflict. In August 1653 courtier Prince Ivan Lobanov-Rostov and steward Ivan Komynin traveled from Astrakhan to Isfahan. Shah Abbas II agreed to settle the conflict, stating that the conflict was initiated without his consent.

=== Wars against Poland and Sweden ===
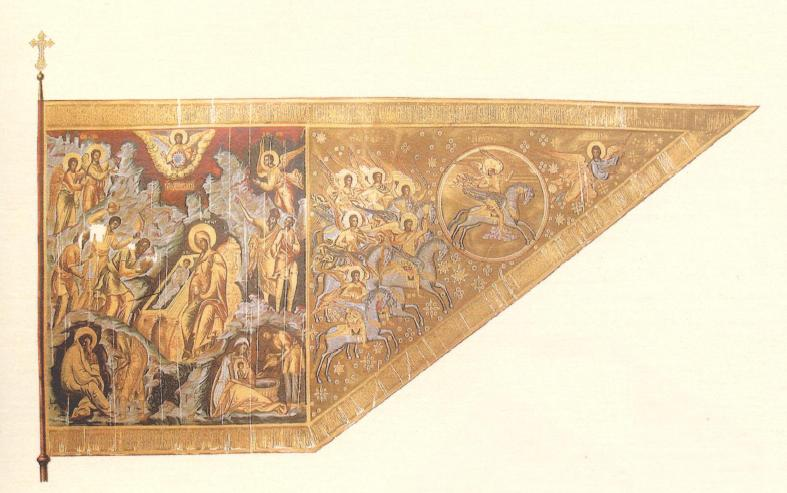
Banner of Tsar Alexis, 1654

In 1653, the weakness and disorder of Poland, which had just emerged from the Khmelnytsky Uprising, encouraged Alexis to attempt to annex parts of White Russia and Little Russia (modern-day Belarus and Ukraine). On 1 October 1653, a national assembly met at Moscow to sanction the war and find the means of carrying it out, and in April 1654, the army was blessed by Nikon, who had been elected patriarch in 1652.

The campaign of 1654 was an uninterrupted triumph, and scores of towns, including the important fortress of Smolensk, fell into the hands of the Russians. Ukrainian hetman Bogdan Khmelnitsky appealed to Tsar Alexis for protection from the Poles, and the Treaty of Pereyaslav brought about Russian dominance of the Cossack Hetmanate in left-bank Ukraine.

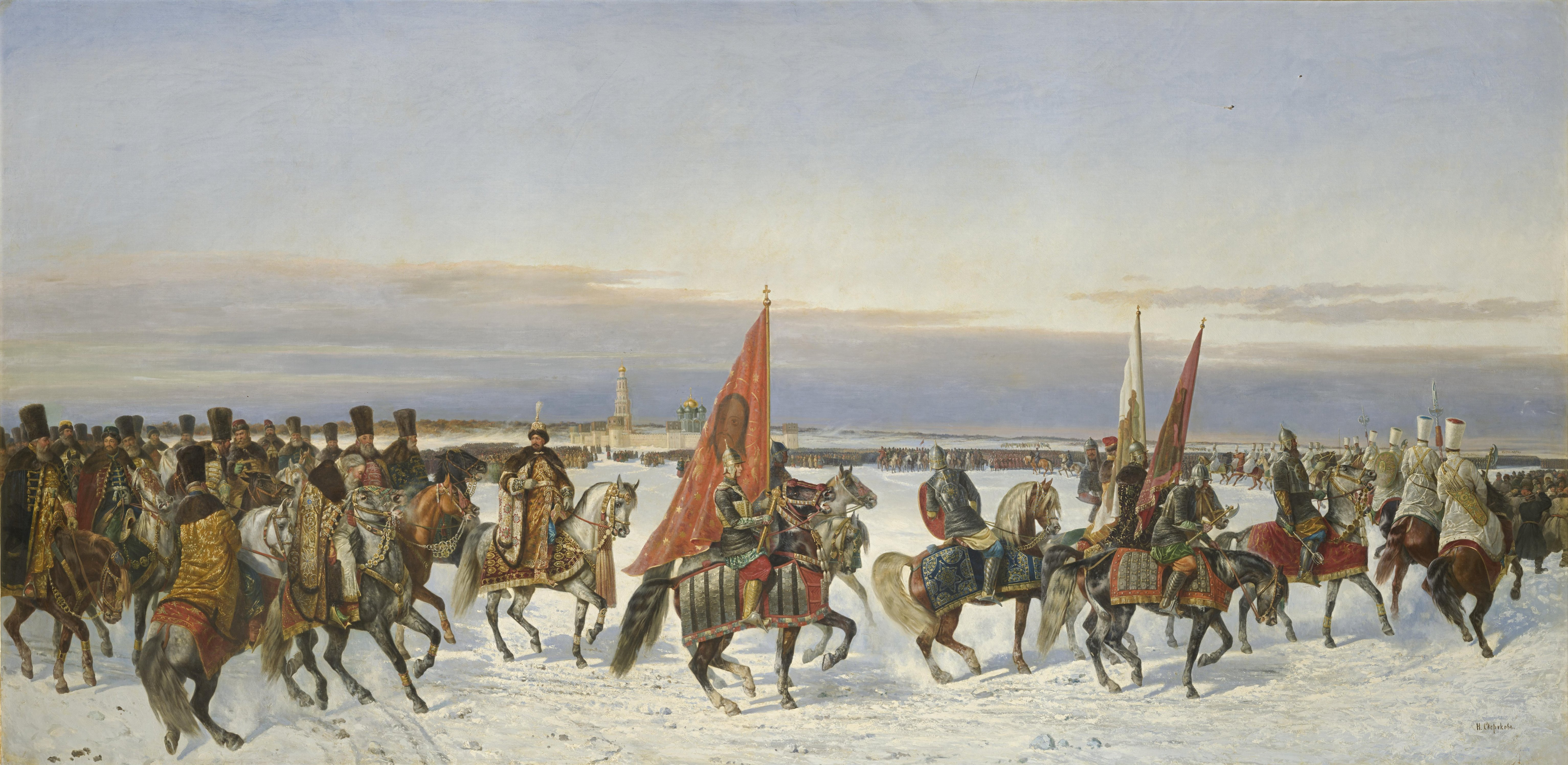
Tsar Alexei inspecting his troops in 1664, painting by Nikolai Sverchkov, 1864

In the summer of 1655, a sudden invasion by Charles X of Sweden briefly swept the Polish state out of existence, in what became known as the Deluge. The Russians, unopposed, quickly appropriated nearly everything that was not already occupied by the Swedes. When the Poles offered to negotiate, the whole grand duchy of Lithuania was the least of the demands made by Alexis. However, Alexis and the king of Sweden quarrelled over the apportionment of the spoils, and at the end of May 1656, with encouragement by the Habsburg emperor and the other enemies of Sweden, Alexis declared war on Sweden.

Great things were expected by Russia of the Swedish war, but nothing came of it. Dorpat was taken, but countless multitudes of men were lost in vain before Riga. In the meantime, Poland had so far recovered herself as to become a much more dangerous foe than Sweden, and, as it was impossible to wage war with both simultaneously, the tsar resolved to rid himself of the Swedes first. In the Peace of Kardis (2 July 1661), Russia retroceded all her conquests.

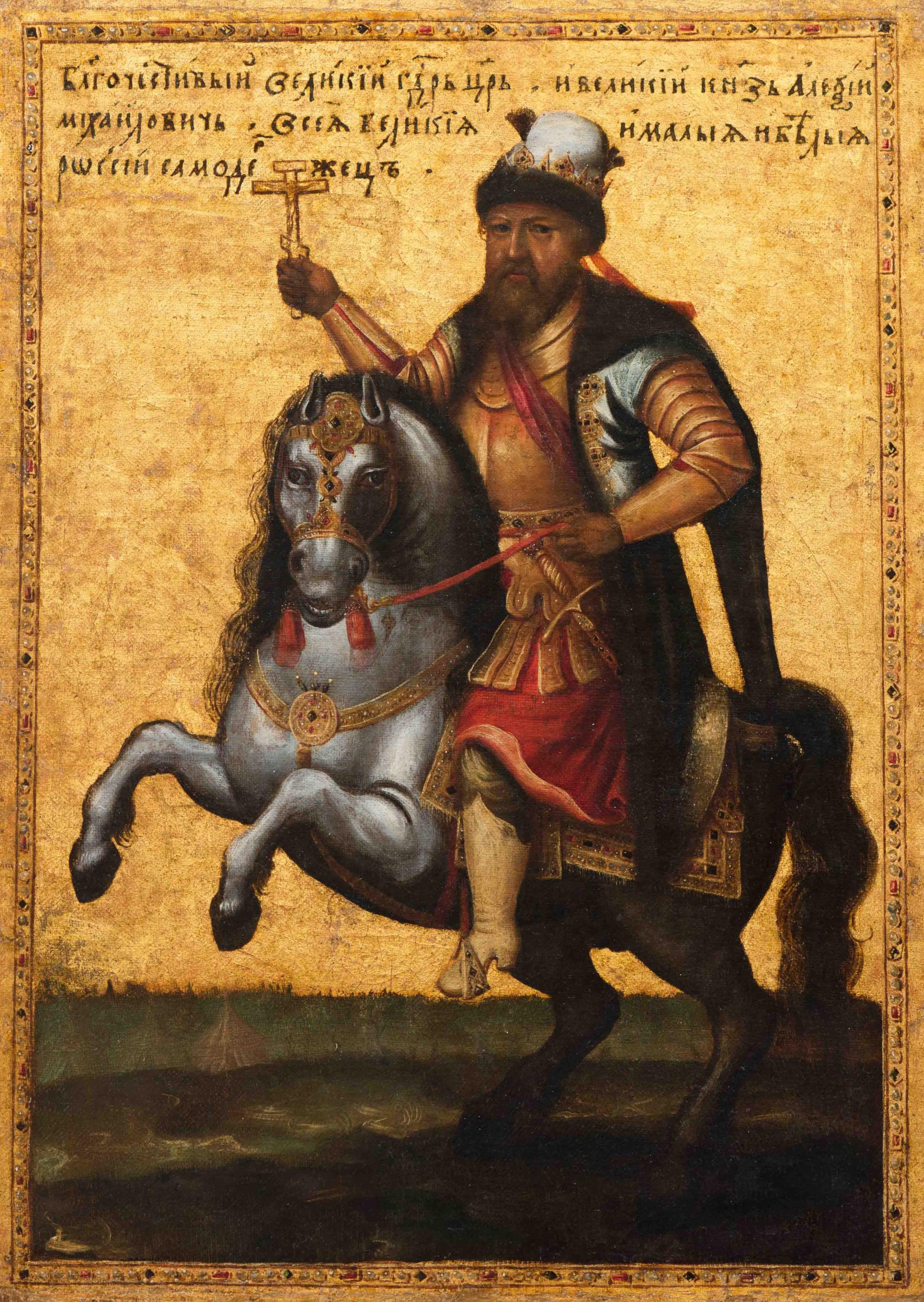
Portrait of Alexis on horseback, 1670s

The Polish war dragged on for six years longer and was then concluded by the Truce of Andrusovo (11 February 1667), nominally for thirteen years, which proved the most durable of treaties. According to the truce, Polotsk and Polish Livonia were restored to Poland, but the more important cities of Smolensk and Kiev remained in the hands of Russia together with the whole eastern bank of the Dnieper river. This truce was the achievement of Afanasy Ordin-Nashchokin, the first Russian chancellor and diplomat in the modern sense, who after the disgrace of Nikon became the tsar's first minister until 1670, when he was superseded by the equally able Artamon Matveyev, whose beneficent influence prevailed to the end of Alexis's reign.

These territorial acquisitions allowed Alexis to call himself the "tsar of all the Russias" and claim imperial rank. The new state seal was introduced in 1667, with three crowns above the eagle symbolizing Astrakhan, Kazan, and Siberia, while the sets of three columns at the borders symbolized Great, White and Little Russia. According to the decree, the eagle holding the sceptre and orb signified "the most gracious Sovereign, His Imperial Majesty, Autocrat, and Possessor."

=== Response to English Civil War ===
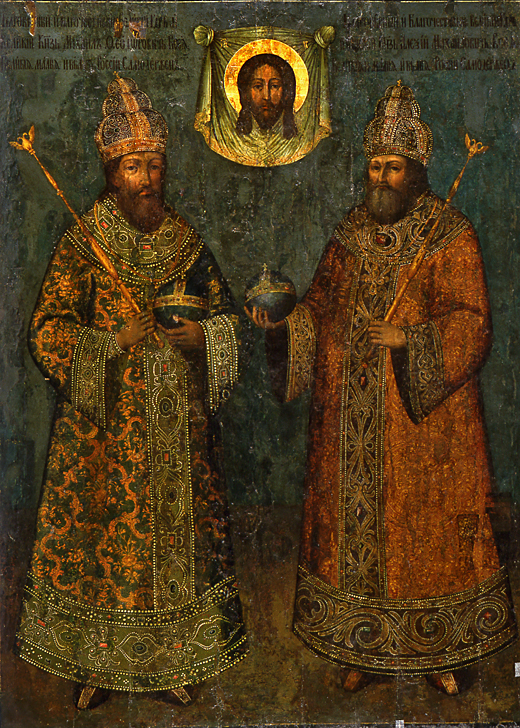
Icon depicting Michael of Russia and his son Alexis, 1678

When Charles I of England was beheaded by the Parliamentarians under Oliver Cromwell in 1649, an outraged Alexis broke off diplomatic relations with England and accepted Royalist refugees in Moscow. He also banned all English merchants from his country (notably members of the Muscovy Company) and provided financial assistance to "the disconsolate widow of that glorious martyr, King Charles I."

=== Schism with the Old Believers ===
In 1653, Patriarch Nikon established a series of reforms that aimed to bring the practices of the Russian Orthodox Church into line with its Greek counterpart. Most notably, the church began to mandate the use of three fingers instead of two in making the sign of the cross. This resulted in significant dissent among the church community. Nevertheless, Alexis continued to support Nikon until 1658, when Nikon abandoned his post due to a personal insult, leaving the seat of the patriarch vacant.

In 1666, the tsar convened the Great Moscow Synod, which was attended by Patriarch Macarius III Ibn al-Za'im and Patriarch Paisius of Alexandria, in order to address the problems caused by Nikon. The synod agreed to formally depose Nikon, and also decided to excommunicate all who opposed the reforms of the church; those opponents broke away from the official Russian Orthodox Church to form the Old Believers movement.

Across Russia, Old Believers were harshly persecuted. One such old believer was Avvakum "the leader of the old Believers". Avvakum "had his wife and children buried alive in front of him; he himself was just exiled".

Several old believers fled to the monastery of Solovki which had revolted in the Solovetsky Monastery uprising. The monastery would be besieged for seven years until 22 January 1676 which was a few days before Alexis's death on 8 February 1676.

== Assessment ==
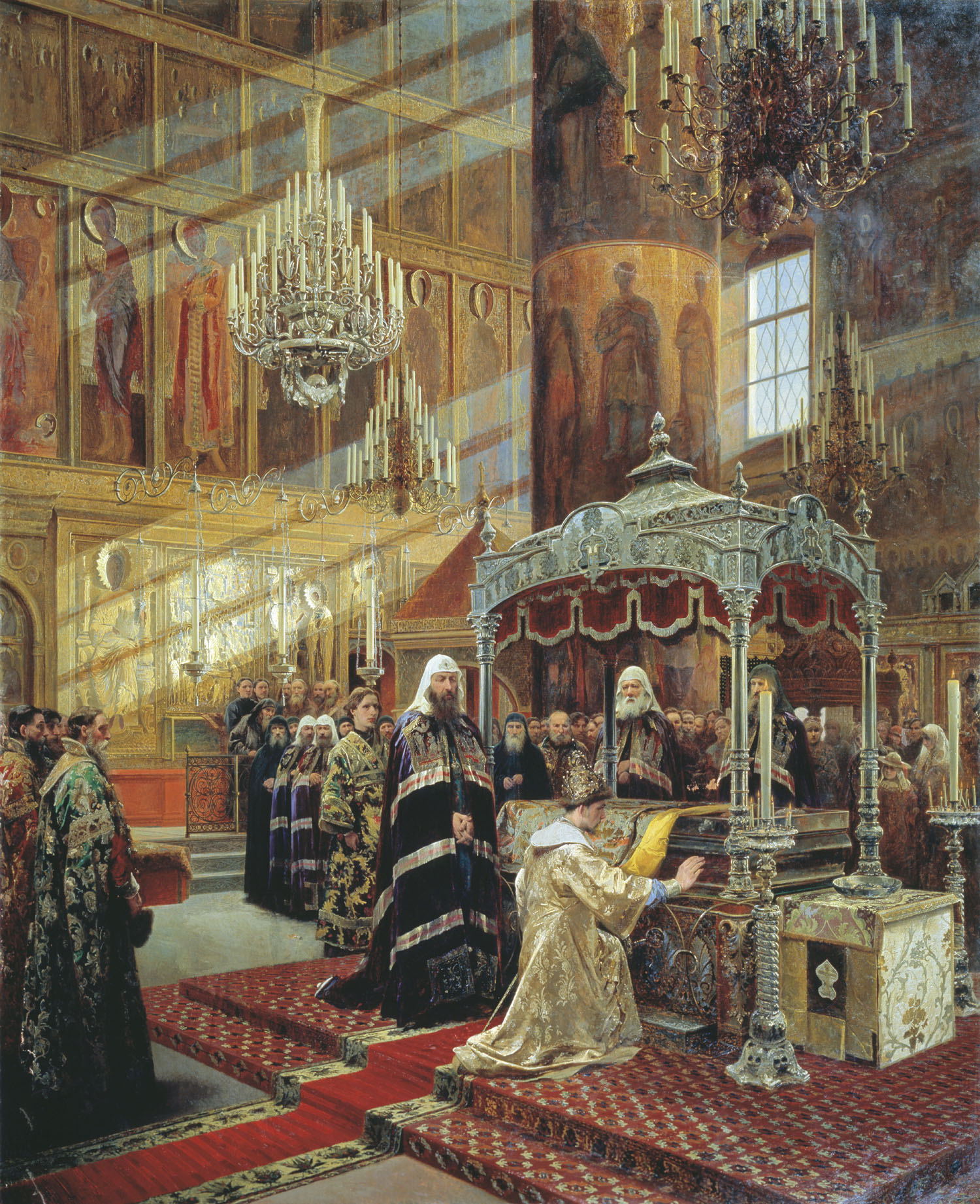
Alexis praying before the relics of Phillip II in the presence of Patriarch Nikon, painting by Alexander Litovchenko, 1886

According to the Encyclopædia Britannica Eleventh Edition:

It is the crowning merit of the Tsar Alexei that he discovered so many great men (like Fyodor Rtishchev, Ordin, Matveyev, the best of Peter's precursors) and suitably employed them. He was not a man of superior strength of character, or he would never have submitted to the dictation of Nikon. But, on the other hand, he was naturally, if timorously, progressive, or he would never have encouraged the great reforming boyar Matveyev. His last years, notwithstanding the terrible rebellion of Stenka Razin, were deservedly tranquil.

Alexis's letters were first published by Pyotr Bartenev in 1856. They have earned him a place in the history of Russian literature, as assessed by D. S. Mirsky:

A few private letters and an instruction to his falconers is all we have of him. But it is sufficient for Sergey Platonov to proclaim him the most attractive of Russian monarchs. He acquired the moniker Tishayshy, which means "most quiet" or "most peaceful". He received this moniker through the ways he behaved—he would be kind and friendly, but the sounds created from instruments would provoke him. Certain aspects of Russian Orthodoxy, not its most purely spiritual, but its aesthetic and worldly aspects, found in him their most complete expression. The essence of Alexis's personality is a certain spiritual Epicureanism, manifested in an optimistic Christian faith, in a profound, but unfanatical, attachment to the traditions and ritual of the Church, in a desire to see everyone round him happy and at peace, and in a highly developed capacity to extract a quiet and mellow enjoyment from all things.

== Personal description ==
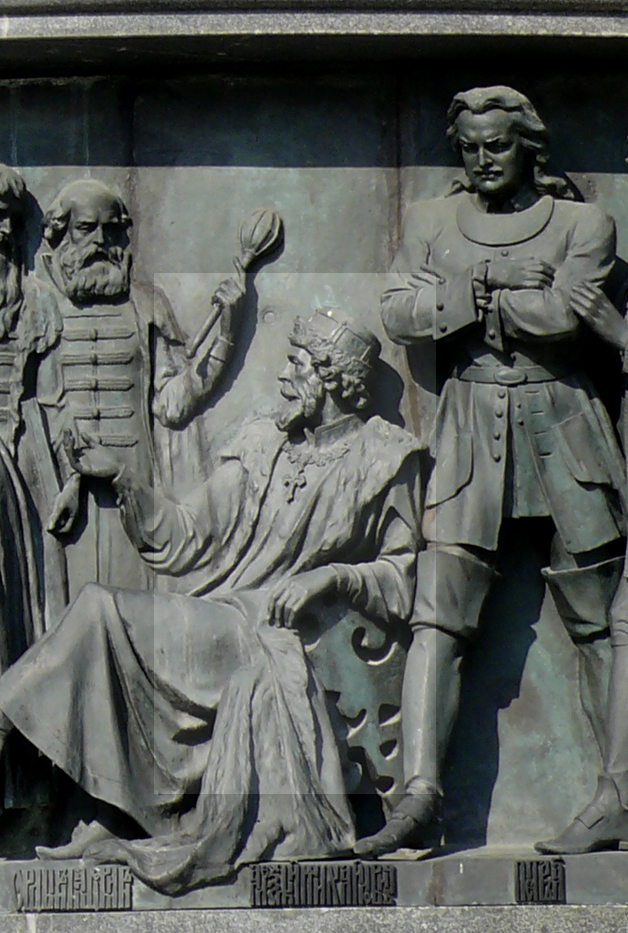
Tsar Alexis on the Millennium of Russia monument in Veliky Novgorod

In 1666, his doctor Samuel Collins described Alexis (then aged 37) as having "a sanguine complexion with light brown hair, his beard uncut. He is tall and fat of a majestical deportment, severe in his anger, bountiful, charitable".

== Title ==
The full title of Alexis in 1667 was:

By the Grace of God, We, the Great Sovereign, Tsar and Grand Prince Alexei Mikhailovich, Autocrat of all Great, Little and White Russia, Moscow, Kiev, Vladimir, Novgorod, Tsar of Kazan, Tsar of Astrakhan, Tsar of Siberia, Sovereign of Pskov and Grand Prince of Tver, Yugorsk, Perm, Vyatka, Bulgar and others, Sovereign and Grand Prince of Novgorod of the Lower Land, Chernigov, Ryazan, Rostov, Yaroslavl, Beloozero, Udoria, Obdoria, Kondia, and Ruler of all the Northern Countries, the Sovereign of the Iverian Lands, the Kartlian and Georgian Tsars and the Kabardian Lands, the Cherkasy and Mountainous Princes and many other States and Lands of the East and West, and the North from Father and Grandfather, and Heir, and Sovereign, and Possessor.

== Family and children ==
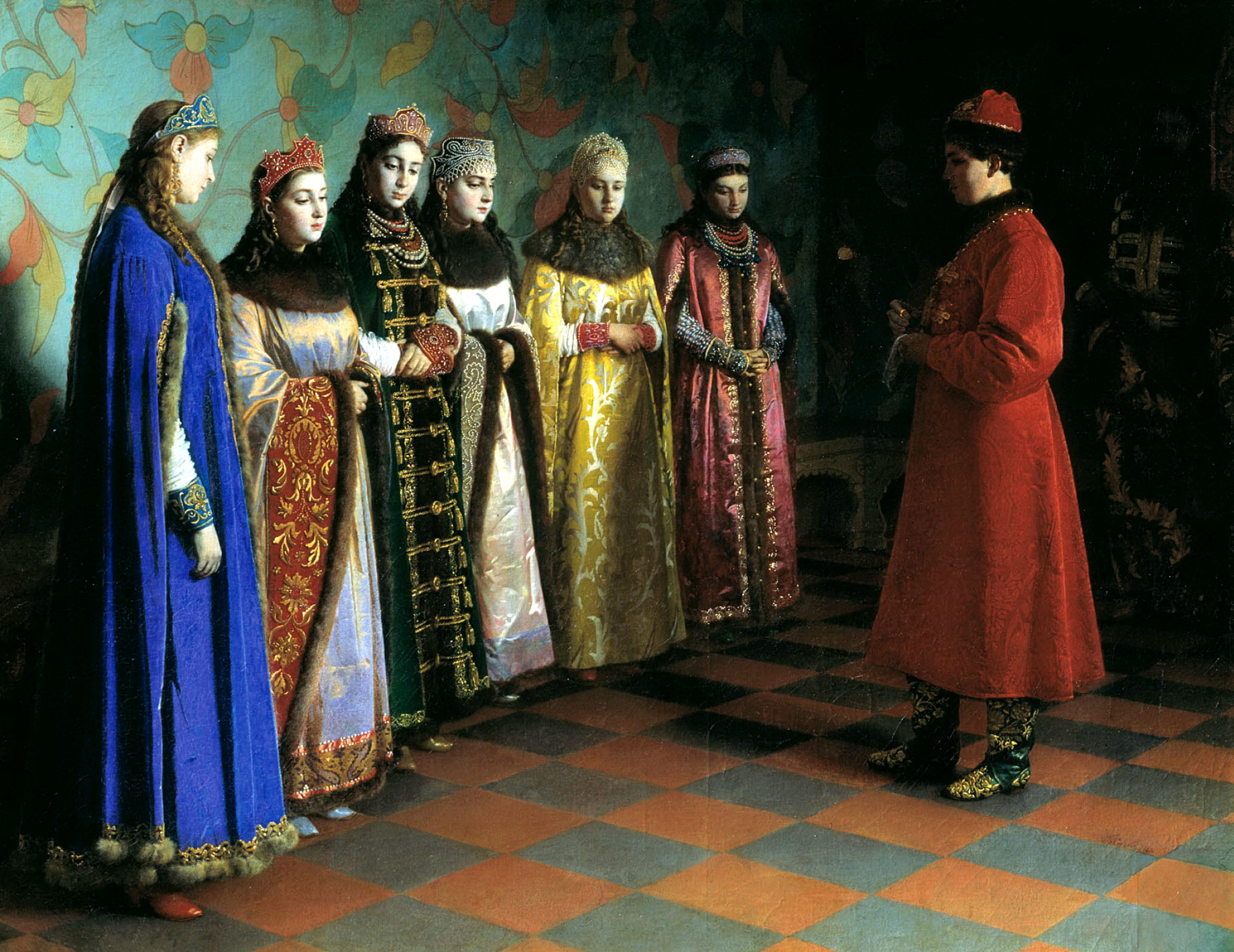
Tsar Alexei chooses his bride, painting by Grigory Sedov, 1882. The winner of the tsardom-wide contest organized by Boris Morozov was his relative Maria Miloslavskaya.

Alexis's first marriage to Miloslavskaya was harmonious and felicitous. They had 13 children (five sons and eight daughters) in 21 years of marriage, and she died only weeks after her thirteenth childbirth. Four sons survived her (Alexei, Fyodor, Semyon and Ivan), but within six months of her death, two of these were dead, including Alexei, the 15-year-old heir to the throne. The couple's children were:

- Dmitri Alexeevich (1648–1649); crown prince; died in infancy
- Yevdokia Alekseevna (1650–1712)
- Marfa Alekseyevna (1652–1707)
- Alexei Alexeevich (1654–1670); crown prince; died unmarried aged 15
- Anna Alexeevna (23 January 1655– 8 May 1659); died in infancy
- Sofia Alexeevna (1657–1704), regent of Russia (1682–1689) for her two younger brothers; never married
- Ekaterina Alexeevna (1658–1718)
- Maria Alexeevna (1660–1723)
- Fyodor III (1661–1682); succeeded his father as Tsar of Russia; died childless
- Feodosia Alexeyevna (1662–1713)
- Simeon Alexeyevich (1665–1669); died in infancy
- Ivan V (1666–1696); was co-ruler along with his younger half-brother Peter, father of Empress Anna
- Yevdokia Alexeevna (1669–1669)

Alexis remarried on 1 February 1671 to Natalya Kirillovna Naryshkina (1 September 1651 – 4 February 1694). She had been brought up in the house of Artamon Matveyev, whose wife was the Scottish-descended Mary Hamilton. Their children were:

- Peter I (1672–1725), later known as "Peter the Great", Tsar and first Emperor of Russia
- Natalya Alexeevna (1673–1716)
- Fyodora Alexeevna (1674–1678)

== See also ==
- Family tree of Russian monarchs

== Sources ==
- Matthee, Rudolph P. (1999). The Politics of Trade in Safavid Iran: Silk for Silver, 1600-1730. Cambridge: Cambridge University Press. ISBN 978-0521641319.
- Matthee, Rudi (2012). Persia in Crisis: Safavid Decline and the Fall of Isfahan. I.B.Tauris. ISBN 978-1845117450.
- Wortman, Richard S. (31 October 2013). Scenarios of Power: Myth and Ceremony in Russian Monarchy from Peter the Great to the Abdication of Nicholas II - New Abridged One-Volume Edition. Princeton University Press. ISBN 978-1-4008-4969-7.

Regnal titles
Preceded by Michael I	Tsar of Russia; 1645–1676	Succeeded by Feodor III
