= Miloslavsky family =

Russian noble family

Miloslavsky Милосла́вские
- noble family
- Parent family: Korsak
- Current region: Muscovy, Russian Empire
- Origin: Grand Duchy of Lithuania
- Founded: 1390
- Founder: Miloslaw Korsak
- Connected families: Tolstoy, Korsakov, Rimsky-Korsakov, House of Romanov
- Dissolution: 18th century

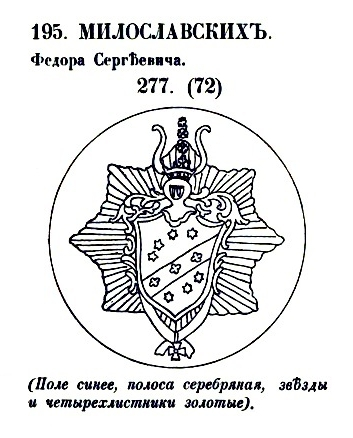
Coat of arms of the Miloslavsky family

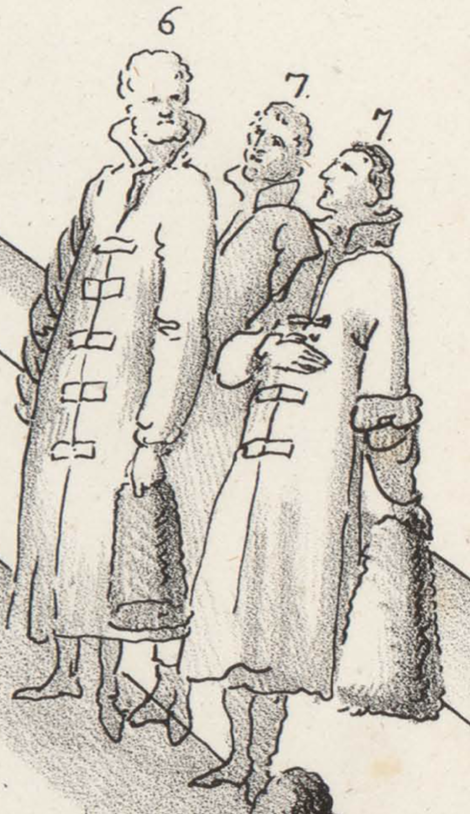
Okolnichiy Miloslavsky

The Miloslavsky family (Russian: Милосла́вские) was a Russian noble family. The Miloslavskys (feminine form: Miloslavskaya; Russian: Милосла́вская) are mostly known for Maria Miloslavskaya who was the first wife of Tsar Alexey Romanov.

== History ==
According to the family's genealogy, the Miloslavsky family have descended from Miloslaw Sigismundowicz, who moved to the Grand Duchy of Moscow in the train of Princess Sophia Vitovtovna of Lithuania in 1390.

According to the genealogical tale, Wienczyslaw and Miloslaw Zigmundowicz were the sons of Sigismund Korsak, a Lithuanian nobleman of the Korsak coat-of-arms, native of Czechia. He was the common ancestor of the Korsakov, Rymsky-Korsakov and Miloslavsky families.

The Miloslavsky family had mostly been regular boyar scions, before they married into the House of Romanov.

Miloslaw's grandson, Terenty Fyodorovich Korsakov-Miloslavsky, had five sons: Daniel nicknamed Kozel, Ilya, Fyodor, Vladimir and Andrey (died childless).

Daniel Miloslavsky (d. circa 1534) was the poselsky (an official who managed lord's villages) in 1460-1472 of Prince of Dmitrov, Yury Vladimirovich (d. 1472). Then he became the poselsky of Grand Duke Ivan III in the Sol-Vychegodsk district. In the late 15th — early 16th centuries he received the volost Pole Krivaldino in Vladimir district. By 1517 he had become an official (dyak) at the court of Vasily III.

His elder son, Dmitry (d. after 1551) was a clerk (pisets) in Bezhetsky Verh (former Novgorod Republic) in 1537. In 1537 — 1548 he acted as a judge in the disputes between the Trinity Monastery of St. Sergius with landed aristocracy. In 1547 — 1550 he had the Lyutosemsky volost in the Dmitrovsky district in fiefdom. In 1551 he became a monk of the Trinity Monastery of St. Sergius.

Ivan Dmitrievich Miloslavsky (d. circa 1570) was a regular landlord. He served as the equarry to the Novgorodian archbishop. In January 1570 he was executed by the Oprichniks. His sons, Mikhail and Luka, served as boyar scions to the Archbishop of Novgorod.

Mikhail Ivanovich Miloslavsky (d. circa 1624) was the assistant to the rynda of the Tsar's troop during the Kaluga campaign; in 1577 he was at the rank of zhilyets during the Livonian campaign. Under Tsar Boris Godunov he became a city dyak. He sided with Vasily Shuysky. Being the dyak at Ivangorod in 1609 — 1611 he was arrested by the supporters of False Dmitry III. He had to admit False Dmitry III, who appointed him the dyak of Pskov (1613 —1614) and Ryazan (1615 —1616).

Grigory Mikhailovich Miloslavsky (d. after 1637) was an active opponent of Bolotnikov and False Dmitry II. Being a dyak in Novgorod region, he opposed Wladislaw IV Vasa. In later years he served as a dvorovoy boyar scion in Novgorod region.

Grigory Prokofyevich Miloslavsky (d. after 1616) was the head of streltsy at Kursk.

Ivan Vasilyevich Miloslavsky (d. after 1634) was the second voivode at Pskov (October-December 1611), where he was captured by False Dmitry III. In 1635 — 1636 he was the voivode at Yuriev-Polsky.

Ilya Danilovich Miloslavsky (1595 —1668), the son of Moscow dvoryanin and voivode Danilo Ivanovich Miloslavsky (d. before 1634), was the father of tsarina Maria Miloslavskaya. He was a stolnik (since 1624). In 1643 he was sent as an envoy to Istanbul. In 1646-1647 he was the envoy to the Netherlands with the honorary title of Viceroy of Medynsk. There he recruited several European officers. In 1648 he married his daughter Maria off to tsar Alexey Romanov. He was the second voivode during the war against Poland of 1654 —1657.

Ivan Bogdanovich Miloslavsky (d. 1681) was the first cousin of Tsarina Maria Miloslavskaya. He was distinghuished in the war against Poland (1654 — 1667). The troop he led captured Dinaburg during the Russo-Swedish war of 1656-1658. As the voivode at Symbirsk (1670 — 1671) he was one of the main leaders crushing Razin's revolt. Successfully returned Astrakhan to Moscow, and became its voivode in 1671. In 1675 he became the voivode in Kazan. He was the Viceroy of Belgorod and the first voivode of the Belgorod troop during the Russo-Turkish war of 1676 —1681.

== Estates ==
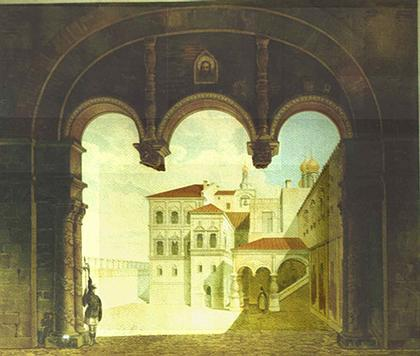
View of the mansion of boyar Ilya Miloslavsky. Now the Amusement Palace at Moscow Kremlin. Painting of the 1840s.

- Petrovskoe (now within Lytkarino, Moscow Oblast), a village owned in fiefdom in the 17th century.
- Lystsovo (Stsypeevo) and Drugunovo, Bolshoy Mikulin Stan, Kolomna Uyezd, an allod.
- An estate in the village of Borok, Shilonskaya Pyatina, Novgorod Uyezd.
- Kurgan and Maryina Gora, Goretov Stan, Moscow Uyezd.
- Amusement Palace at Moscow Kremlin, the mansion formerly owned by boyar Ilya Danilovich Miloslavsky.

== Coat-of-arms ==
The coat-of-arms of the Miloslavsky family is described in the Armorial by Anisim Kniazev (1785). The image is based on the seal of vice-admiral Fyodor Sergeevich Miloslavsky (d. 1783). On the blue shield, there is a silver diagonal stripe with three golden quatrefoils. In the upper section there are four golden six-pointed stars, while in the lower part there are three golden six-pointed stars. The stars are placed in arced lines. Over the shield there is the barred knight's helmet with the crown of nobility. The crest is two horns and three roses on top of one another crowned with a quatrefoil. Beneath the shield there is a templar cross on a ribbon.

== See also ==
- Maria Miloslavskaya
