= Tsarevna =

Daughter of a Russian tsar

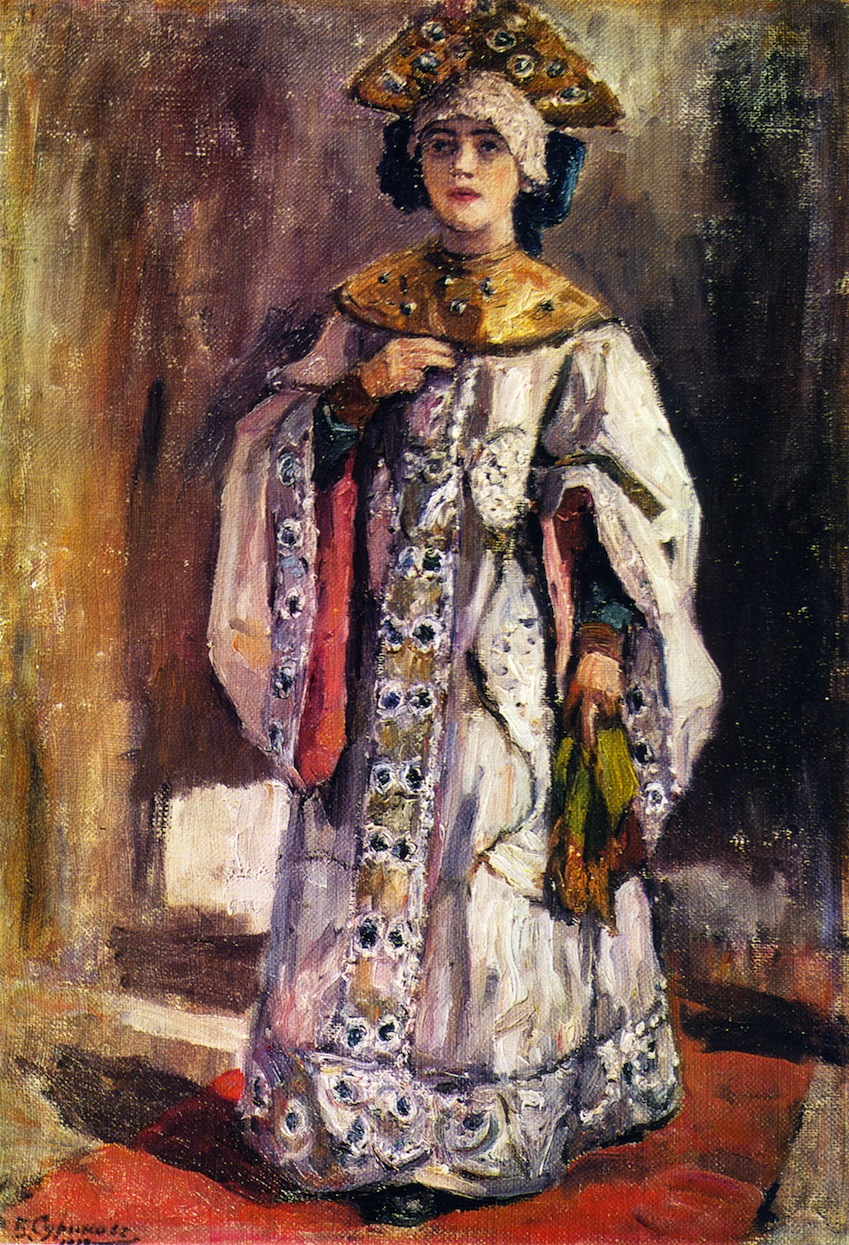
Painting of a tsarevna by Vasily Surikov

Tsarevna (Russian: царевна, IPA: [t͡sɐˈrʲevnə]) was a title given to the daughters of tsars in Russia before the 18th century. The male equivalent was tsarevich.

All of them died unmarried with the exception of the daughters of Ivan V. Notably, his daughter Catherine married Karl Leopold of Mecklenburg-Schwerin.

Both tsarevna and tsarevich were replaced with grand duchess and grand duke (with tsesarevich given to the heir apparent).
