= Ivan V of Russia =

Tsar of Russia from 1682 to 1696

Ivan V
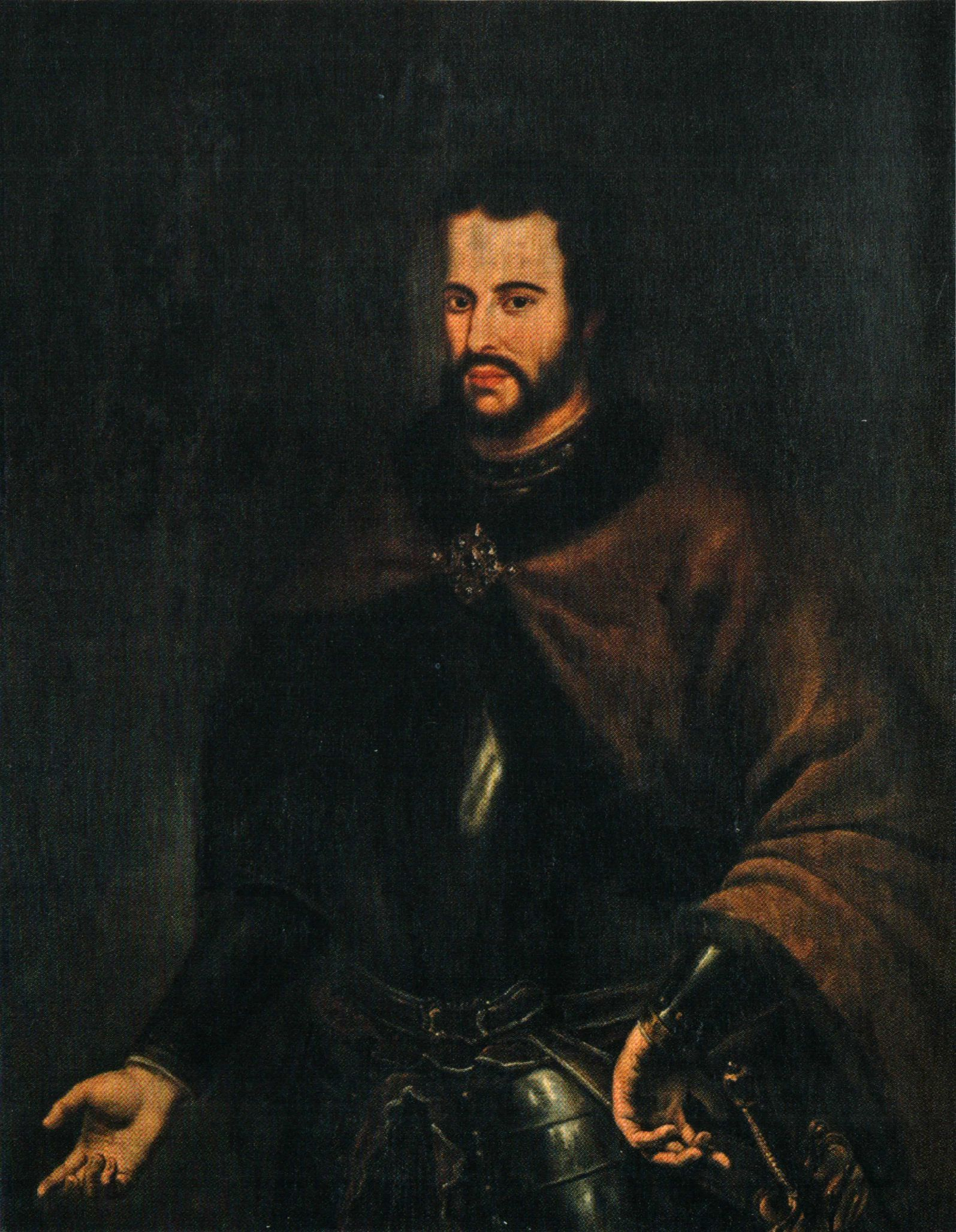
- Portrait by Mikhail Choglokov, 1696

Tsar of all Russia
- Reign: 7 May 1682 – 8 February 1696
- Coronation: 25 June 1682
- Predecessor: Feodor III
- Successor: Peter I (Alone)
- Co-monarch: Peter I
- Regent: Sophia Alekseyevna (1682–1689)
- Born: 6 September 1666; Moscow, Tsardom of Russia
- Died: 8 February 1696 (aged 29); Moscow, Tsardom of Russia
- Burial: Archangel Cathedral
- Spouse: Praskovia Saltykova (m. 1684)
- Issue more...: Catherine, Duchess of Mecklenburg-Schwerin; Anna of Russia; Praskovia Ivanovna
Names
- Ivan Alekseyevich Romanov
- House: Romanov
- Father: Alexis of Russia
- Mother: Maria Miloslavskaya
- Religion: Russian Orthodox

Ivan V Alekseyevich (Russian: Иван V Алексеевич; 6 September [O.S. 27 August] 1666 – 8 February [O.S. 29 January] 1696) was Tsar of all Russia between 1682 and 1696, jointly ruling with his younger half-brother Peter I. Ivan was the youngest son of Alexis I of Russia by his first wife, Maria Miloslavskaya, while Peter was the only son of Alexis by his second wife, Natalya Naryshkina. Ivan's reign was solely titular because he had serious physical and mental challenges.

== Early life and accession ==
Ivan V was born in 1666 in Moscow, the youngest son of Tsar Alexis and Maria Miloslavskaya. Only two of his older brothers survived childhood; his eldest brother, Alexei, died aged 15 in 1670, therefore his second brother, Feodor, became tsar upon the death of their father. When Feodor died in 1682 without issue, the court was faced with a crisis of succession, because Ivan, the next-oldest brother, was thought to be "infirm in body and mind." It was proposed that he be passed over in favor of his younger half-brother, Peter, who was only 10 years old at this time, but was healthy in mind and body, and could be expected to provide adequate leadership in adulthood.

The church and the Naryshkins (family of Peter's mother, Natalya Naryshkina) supported Peter's proposed ascension to the throne. However, the family of Ivan V's mother (the Miloslavski) and Ivan's older sister, Sofia Alekseyevna, in particular, disputed the move. Rumors spread around Moscow that Feodor III had been poisoned and Ivan strangled by boyars so that the 10-year-old Peter could become Tsar. These rumours fomented the Moscow Uprising of 1682, and the streltsy stormed the Kremlin. These disturbances subsided only after Ivan appeared in person in the city, and proved to everyone that he was alive and well.

The streltsy demanded that Ivan be named tsar, and a compromise was found by declaring Ivan and Peter as co-rulers, with a regency government until the boys came of age. Sofia Alekseyevna, who had been influential at court during her brother Feodor's reign, was named regent.

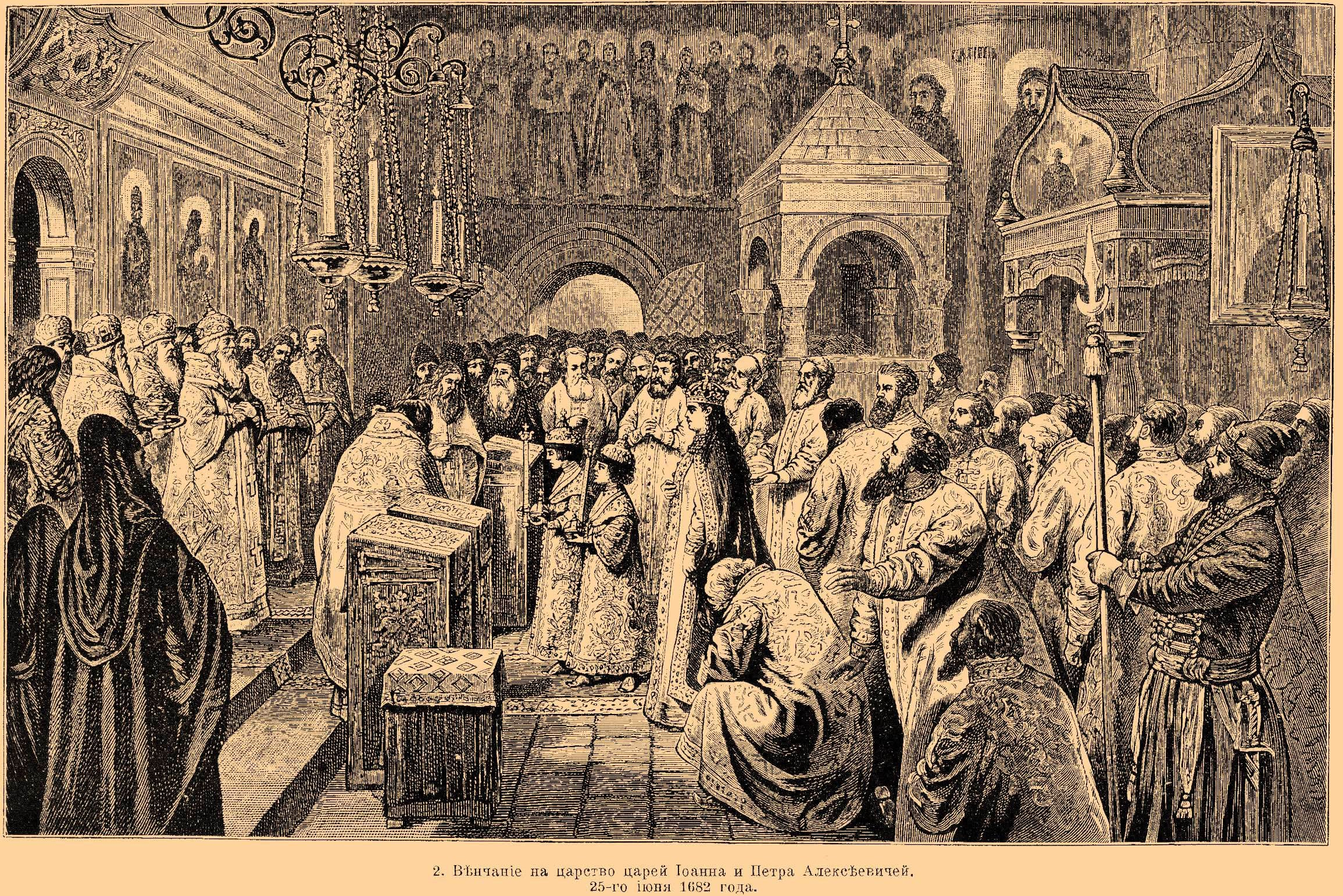
Ivan V and Peter I being crowned as joint Tsars of Russia

== Tsar and co-ruler ==
On 25 June 1682, less than two months after the death of Feodor III, Ivan and Peter were crowned in the Cathedral of the Dormition as co-Tsars. A special throne with two seats was commissioned for the occasion (now on display in the Kremlin Armoury). While Ivan was 16 years old at this time, his co-ruler Peter I was only 10. Ivan was considered the "senior tsar", but actual power was wielded by Sophia Alekseyevna, Ivan's full sister and Peter's half-sister, for the next seven years.

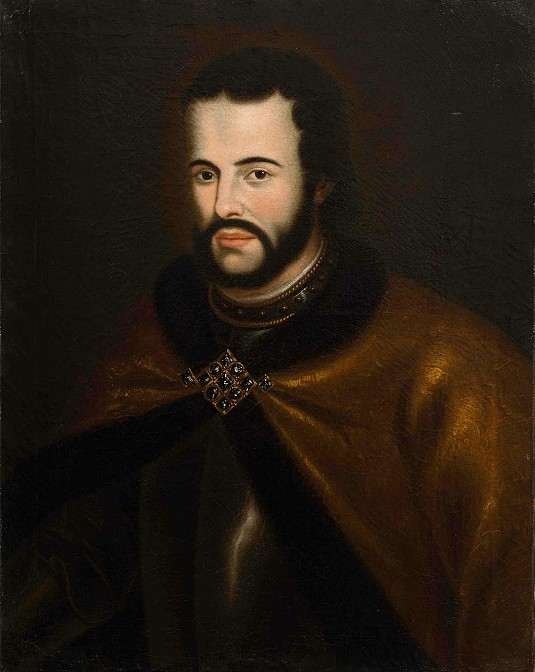
Portrait of Ivan V

Sophia was always considerate of Ivan, although she is never known to have consulted him on any important matter. She was anxious that every outward sign of respect and deference be paid to Ivan, which was a subtle way of undermining the influence of Peter's faction in court. Thus, every wish or opinion expressed by Ivan was deferred to, and his general prestige in court remained intact during the years of Sophia's regency. As Peter grew up, he and his faction, led by his mother's Naryshkin family, contended with Regent Sophia for influence and power. Indeed, Sophia is blamed (perhaps unfairly, as a tactic of defamation) for the murders of Peter's uncles on his mother's side of the family. Due to this and other factors, tension arose between the factions of the two co-tsars.

Ivan being both incapable and uninterested, Peter came into his own and functioned as though he were the sole tsar. The eventual result was that, over time, the outward signs of deference and power which Ivan had enjoyed during the regency slowly withered away, and he became a non-entity in the Russian court. For the last decade of his life, Ivan was completely overshadowed by the more energetic Peter I. He spent his days with his wife, Praskovia Saltykova, caring about little but "fasting and praying, day and night".

== Marriage and issue ==
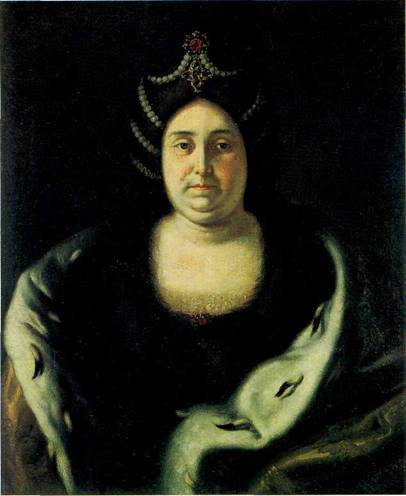
Praskovia Saltykova, Portrait by Ivan Nikitin.

In late 1683 or early 1684, Ivan married Praskovia Saltykova, daughter of Fyodor Petrovich Saltykov, a minor nobleman, by his wife, whose name is uncertain – it was either Yekaterina Fyodorovna or Anna Mikhailovna Tatishcheva. Ivan's marriage was arranged in the traditional style of Russian rulers: he selected a bride from a parade of potential candidates.

Praskovia Saltykova, who came from a rather obscure Russian noble family, had been raised in a middle-class household and adhered to conventional values and moral standards. She bonded strongly with her gentle and simple-minded husband and became the mainstay of his life. She proved to be an exemplary wife to a mentally challenged man. Her moral character, simple lifestyle, charity, piety and non-involvement in politics were admired by all. She earned the lifelong respect of her powerful brother-in-law, Peter the Great, who entrusted the care and education of his own two daughters to her, imploring her to bring them up to be just like herself.

Ivan's purported debility did not prevent him from producing robust offspring, and Praskovia bore him five daughters, three of whom lived to adulthood. Their children were:

- Maria Ivanovna (1689–1692), died in infancy
- Feodosia Ivanovna (1690–1691), died in infancy
- Ekaterina Ivanovna (1691–1733), grandmother of the unfortunate Ivan VI of Russia
- Anna Ivanovna (1693–1740), ruled as Empress of Russia; no issue
- Praskovia Ivanovna (1694–1731), had issue one son who died in infancy

== Death and succession ==
At the age of 27, Ivan was described by foreign ambassadors as senile, paralytic and almost blind. He died two years later, on 8 February 1696, and was interred in the Archangel Cathedral. It was fortuitous to Peter's faction that Ivan produced several daughters but no sons, as there was no confusion regarding the succession of the crown upon his death. His co-ruler was left to become supreme ruler of Russia; with Ivan's death, the struggle for power within the family had finally ended.

In 1730, more than 30 years after Ivan's death, his second surviving daughter, Anna, Duchess of Courland, was invited to the throne of Russia by the country's privy council. She ruled for more than 10 years, and was succeeded by Ivan's infant great-grandson Ivan VI; however, a palace coup engineered in 1741 by Ivan's niece Elizabeth resulted in the throne passing finally to the progeny of Peter the Great.

== See also ==
- Rulers of Russia family tree

== Notes ==
Regnal titles
Preceded by Feodor III	Tsar of Russia with Peter I 1682–1696	Succeeded by Peter I
