= Irina Mikhailovna of Russia =

Russian Tsarevna

Tsarevna Irina Mikhailovna
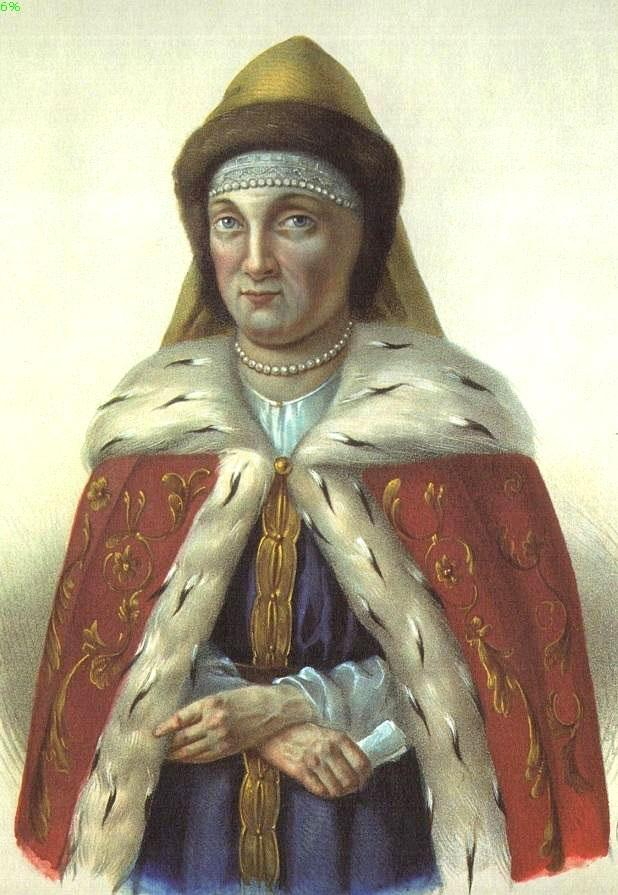
- Irina Mikhailovna Romanova by P.Borel
- Born: 22 April 1627
- Died: 8 April 1679 (aged 51)
- Burial: Novospassky Monastery
Names
- Russian: Ирина Михайловна
- House: Romanov
- Father: Michael of Russia
- Mother: Eudoxia Streshneva
- Religion: Eastern Orthodoxy

Irina Mikhailovna (Russian: Ирина Михайловна; 22 April 1627 – 8 April 1679), was a Russian Tsarevna, the eldest daughter of Tsar Michael of Russia from his second marriage to Eudoxia Streshneva, a noblewoman from Mozhaysk. She was the elder sister of Alexis of Russia and the first 'purple born' child of the Romanov dynasty.

== Biography ==
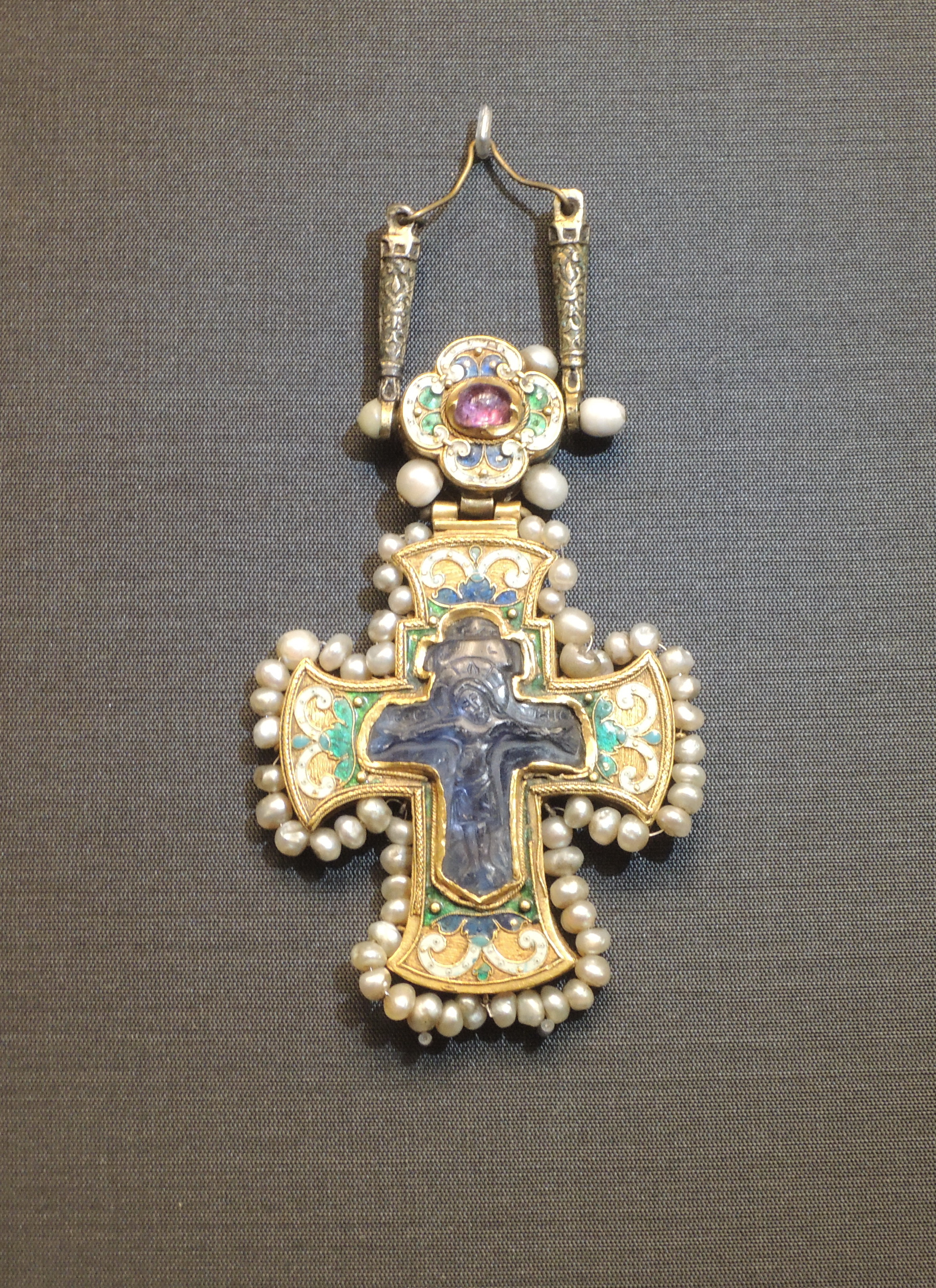
Crucifix presented by Evdokia Lukyanovna to Princess Irina Mikhailovna in 1627.

Irina was baptized in the Chudov Monastery by her grandfather Patriarch Filaret, a crucifix formerly belonging to Ivan the Terrible was gifted to Irina and used in the ceremony. Like other Russian princesses of her time, Irina grew up secluded from men and the world outside of the terem, where she was taught reading, writing, and needlework.

In 1640, Irina was engaged to marry Valdemar Christian of Schleswig-Holstein when she was 13.

Valdemar arrived in Russia for the wedding in 1644, but after arriving, he refused to convert to the Orthodox faith despite the Tsar's influence. Valdemar was imprisoned in an attempt to change his mind, until 1645 upon the death of Michael I and Alexis I acceded to the throne. Irina never married.

=== Later life ===
Irina was close to her brother, Tsar Alexis, who mentions her before his wife and children in his letters and seem to have regarded her as the first lady of the family. She exerted some degree of influence over him, but their relationship cooled down during Alexis' second marriage in 1671. After this, she spent more time on an estate which she had inherited from her grandmother, Xenia Shestova, outside of Moscow.

She devoted her life mainly on her estate, and showed support for the Old Believers, whom she on several occasions saved from execution. In 1672, at the baptism of Peter the Great, she and Feodor III of Russia became his godparents.

== See also ==
- Patriarch Joseph of Moscow
