= Anna Mikhailovna of Russia =

Daughter of Michael of Russia and Eudoxia Streshneva (1630–1692)

Tsarevna Anna Mikhailovna
- Born: 14 August 1630; Moscow
- Died: 27 October 1692 (aged 62)
- Burial: Ascension Convent
- Russian: Анна Михайловна
- House: Romanov
- Father: Michael of Russia
- Mother: Eudoxia Streshneva
- Religion: Russian Orthodox

Anna Mikhailovna (Russian: Анна Михайловна; 14 July 1630 – 27 October 1692) was a Russian tsarevna as the daughter of Michael of Russia and Eudoxia Streshneva. She was also the sister of Alexis.

== Biography ==
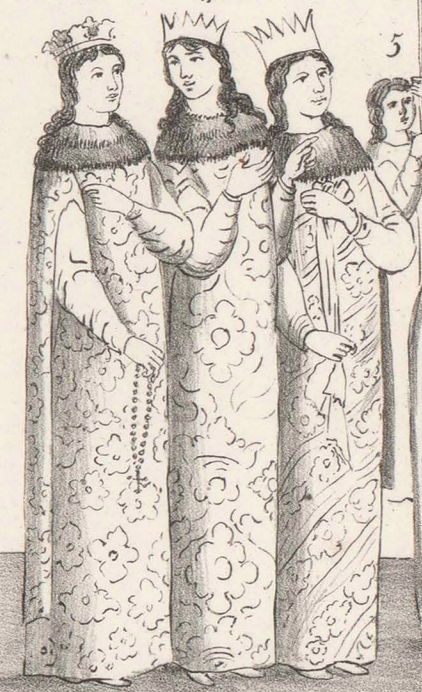
Drawing of Anna and her sisters by Avgustin Meyerberg, ambassador of the Holy Roman Empire to Russia (1661–1662)

Anna was presumably named after her father's aunt. There is little information of her life. The Muscovite custom at the time dictated the ideal life of a Russian princess as a cloistered seclusion from the world; as they were not permitted to marry a non-Orthodox nor a partner below their social status, and there were no Orthodox Kingdoms other than Russia at the time, daughters of the tsar were expected never to marry, nor have any contact with men outside of the family during their life. This necessitated a life secluded with an all-female staff in the imperial terem; the tsarevnas attended church and even official state processions covered by screens, and made their pilgrimages to convents in covered sleighs and wagons, as was in fact the custom for all Russian noblewomen at the time.

Tsarevna Anna's life seem to have answered to this ideal of seclusion. As was required of her, she stayed unmarried. It is known that she was among those accompanying her sister-in-law tsaritsa Maria when the court was evacuated during the Moscow Plague of 1654.

She was known as a supporter of her niece Sophia and her reign as regent. In 1689, when Sofia was deposed by Peter, Foy de la Neuville reported that Sophia sent her sister Marfa Alekseyevna and her aunts Anna Mikhailovna and Tatyana Mikhailovna to mediate.

Anna became a nun at the Ascension Convent a couple of days before her death, taking the name Anfisa.

== Bibliography ==
- Иконникова А. Царицы и царевны из дома Романовых. М., 1991.
