= Shestov =

Shestov (masculine, Russian: Шестов) or Shestova (feminine, Russian: Шестова) is a Russian surname. Notable people with the surname include:

- Lev Shestov (1866–1938), Russian existentialist and philosopher
- Xenia Shestova (1560–1631), Russian nun and mother of Michael of Russia
