= Eudoxia Streshneva =

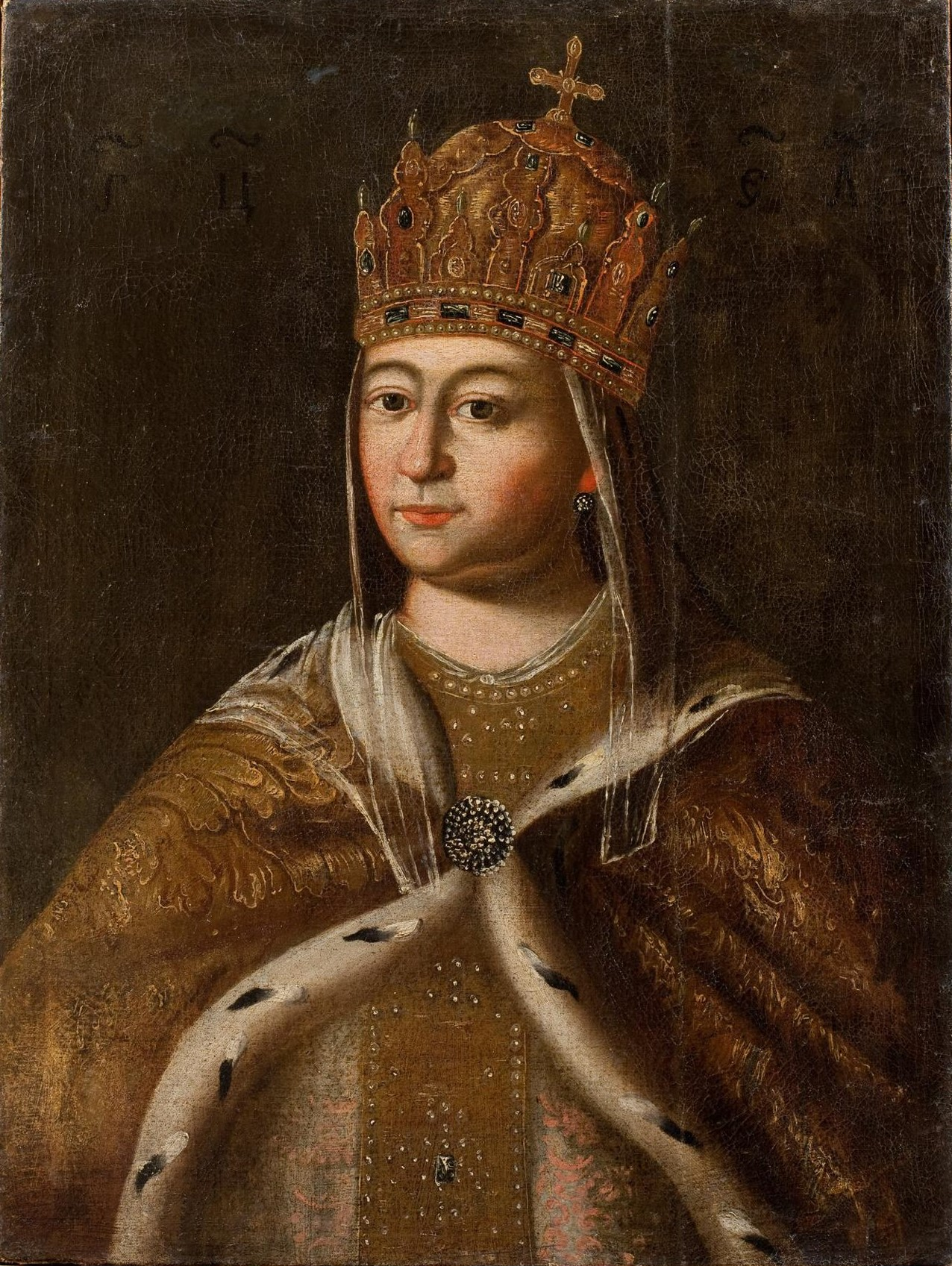

Tsaritsa consort of All Russia
- Tenure: 5 February 1626 – 12 July 1645
- Predecessor: Maria Dolgorukova
- Successor: Maria Miloslavskaya
- Born: c. 1608; Meshchovsk, Russia
- Died: 18 August 1645 (aged 36–37); Moscow, Russia
- Burial: Ascension Convent; Archangel Cathedral (1929)
- Spouse: Michael of Russia (m. 1626; died 1645)
- Issue among others...: Tsarevna Irina Mikhailovna; Alexis I of Russia; Tsarevna Anna Mikhailovna; Tsarevna Tatiana Mikhailovna
- House: Romanov
- Father: Lukyan Stepanovich Streshnev
- Mother: Anna Konstantinovna Volkonskaya
- Religion: Eastern Orthodoxy

Eudoxia Streshneva (Russian: Евдоки́я Лукья́новна Стре́шнева, romanized: Yevdokiya Lukyanovna Streshneva; 1608 – 18 August 1645) was Tsaritsa of Russia as the second wife of Tsar Michael of Russia.

== Life ==
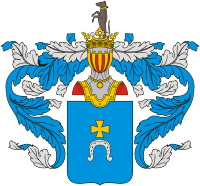
Coat of arms of the Streshnevs

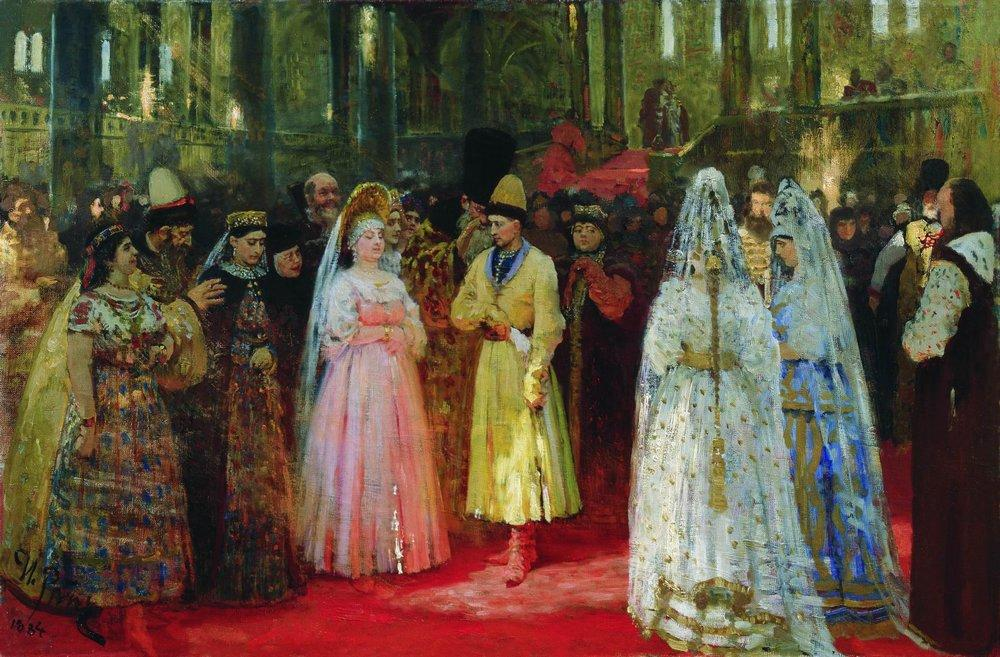
Mikhail Fyodorovich Choosing His Bride, by Ilya Repin.

Eudoxia Streshneva was a daughter of Lukyan Stepanovich Streshnev (d. 1630) from Meshchovsk and his wife, Anna Konstantinovna Volkonskaya. Her family belonged to an old Russian nobility of Polish descent from the Principality of Polotsk. Her mother died shortly after birth, and her father left home to serve in the military. She was thus regarded almost an orphan and was raised by a rich relative who belonged to the circle of the tsar's court in Moscow. She was distantly related to Tikhon Nikitich Streshnev a Russian boyar and statesman during the reign of Peter I of Russia, one of the first members of the Governing Senate and the first governor of Moscow, after the post was reformed by Peter.

=== Marriage ===
Eudoxia Streshneva was among those daughters of the nobility summoned to appear in the bride-show at court, when the tsar was to select his new tsaritsa, after his first spouse had died. Tsar Michael did not like any of those selected for him to choose from, but was pressed by his parents to make a choice. He eventually chose Eudoxia because of her beauty, polite behavior and mild disposition.

The parents of the tsar were reportedly displeased with his choice. His mother, Xenia Shestova, claimed that Streshneva was not of an important enough family, and that he risked angering all the most high ranked noble families by choosing a bride from a family of a lower rank than them.

However, the tsar refused to change his mind. He did not only refer to his feelings, but also to his Christian duty to help a girl who would otherwise be forced to leave court and anger her family. She was described as a modest and virtuous girl, dominated by her proud relatives, who sometimes brought her to tears but still did not complain. Reportedly, the tsar was moved by her situation and felt sorry for her.

The wedding was conducted on 5 February 1626. As was the custom, Eudoxia was given the title of Tsaritsa prior to the wedding, but only three days before the wedding, which was a much shorter time period than usual. Her parents-in-law both participated in the ceremony. They wished to change her name to Anastasia from the tsaritsa of tsar Ivan, but she successfully refused. After the wedding, she was given several lands, and a substantial fortune of her own.

=== Tsaritsa ===
As tsaritsa, Eudoxia Streshneva lived in the terem, secluded from contact with men, as was expected from a Russian noblewoman at the time. Despite this, she was also expected to participate in public religious and charitable duties and manage the imperial household.

Tsaritsa Eudoxia was known to have been in a difficult situation in the imperial court because of her mother-in-law, Xenia Shestova, who dominated her and the life of the imperial court. She and her mother-in-law shared the same confessor and diak. Xenia Shestova accompanied her daughter-in-law during all her official visits to monasteries and churches, and managed her public life as a tsaritsa. She also chose tutors for her grandchildren, dominating her relationship to them. Eudoxia never managed to achieve any influence over Tsar Mikhail, either during or after the death of her mother-in-law.

Reportedly, Eudoxia was under great pressure to produce a son and heir to the throne, a task which gave her great anxiety until the birth of Tsarevich Aleksei in 1629. After the birth of her last child in 1639, Tsar Michael reportedly no longer wished to share her bed. She is noted to have given donations to churches and convents in order to be given another child, but without success.

In 1642, Eudoxia financed the rebuilding of the Saint George Monastery in Meshchovsk. She also benefited the Ivanovsky Convent, where she made several visits and often prayed to Saint Martha during her pregnancies. She founded several charitable institutions, and made public donations to charitable and religious subjects.

=== Death ===
Eudoxia Streshneva died shortly after her spouse. She was buried in the Ascension Convent.

== Issue ==
Yevdokiya and Mikhail had ten children:

Name	Birth	Death
Tsarevna Irina	22 April 1627	8 February 1679
Tsarevna Pelagiya	20 April 1628	25 January 1629
Tsarevich Aleksei	9 May 1629	29 January 1676
Tsarevna Anna	14 August 1631	27 October 1676
Tsarevna Marfa	1631	21 September 1632
Tsarevich Ivan	1 June 1633	10 January 1639
Tsarevna Sofiya	14 September 1634	23 April 1636
Tsarevna Tatyana	5 January 1636	23 August 1706
Tsarevna Yevdokiya	1637?	10 February 1637
Tsarevich Vasily	1638/39?	25 March 1639

Russian royalty
Vacant Title last held by Maria Dolgorukova	Tsaritsa consort of Russia; 1626–1645	Vacant Title next held by Maria Miloslavskaya
