= Maria Dolgorukova =

Tsaritsa of all Russia
- Tenure: 19 September 1624 – 17 January 1625
- Predecessor: Maria Buynosova-Rostovskaya
- Successor: Eudoxia Streshneva
- Born: 1608
- Died: 17 January [O.S. 6 January] 1625
- Burial: Ascension Convent, Kolomenskoye; Archangel Cathedral, Kremlin (1929)
- Spouse: Michael of Russia
- Issue: Stillborn child
Names
- Maria Vladimirovna Dolgorukova
- House: Dolgorukov
- Father: Vladimir Dolgorukov
- Mother: Maria Barbashina-Shuyskaya
- Religion: Russian Orthodox

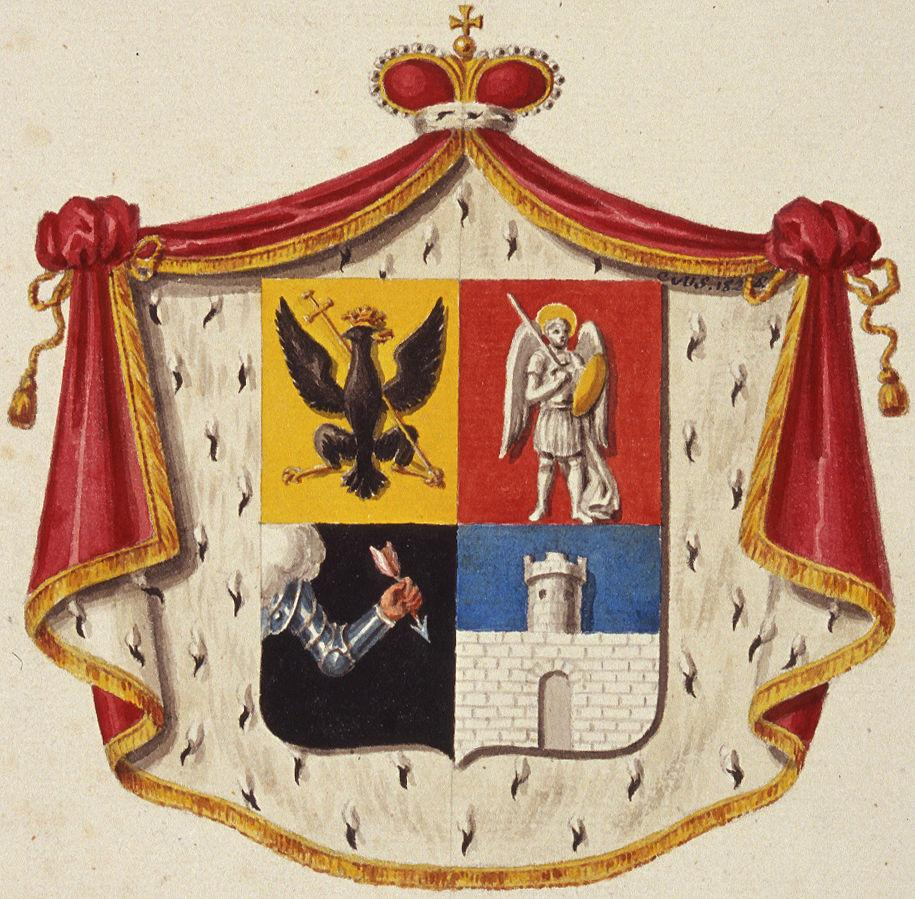
Coat of Arms of Dolgoruky family

Maria Vladimirovna Dolgorukova (Russian: Мария Владимировна Долгорукова; 1608 – 17 January [O.S. 6 January] 1625) was the tsaritsa of all Russia as the first wife of Michael of Russia. She was the first tsaritsa of the Romanov dynasty.

== Life ==
Maria Dolgorukova was born in 1608 into the family of the boyar and knyaz Vladimir Timofeyevich Dolgorukov (1569–1633), and his wife, Maria Vasilievna Barbashina-Shuyskaya (1575–1633/4). Her family were a collateral branch of the Rurik dynasty, and related to past Russian grand princes.

She was selected for marriage to Michael by his mother, Xenia Shestova, after several years of difficulty in finding a partner for the tsar. In 1616, Shestova refused to accept the tsar's choice of Maria Ivanovna Khlopova, and Michael I had eventually been forced to give up his plans to marry her. In 1619, the tsar's father, Patriarch Philaret of Moscow, suggested he marry the sister of John, Prince of Schleswig-Holstein, but eventually, these negotiations were discontinued. In 1623, Xenia Shestova selected Maria Dolgorukova as a marriage partner because of her family connections; her sister Marfa (c. 1600–1634) had been married to the prince Ivan Shuysky ("the Button") (c. 1566 – c. 1638), the brother of Vasili IV of Russia, the last monarch of Russia from the Rurik dynasty.

The wedding took place on 19 September 1624. Not long after the wedding, Maria took ill. She finally died on 17 January [O.S. 6 January] 1625, four months after the wedding. There were rumors at the time that she had been poisoned by a court conspiracy, determined to prevent any potential pro-Rurikid influence, or by the enemies of the Dolgorukov family. Chronicles called her death a divine punishment for the fate of the previous fiancée of the tsar, Maria Ivanovna Khlopova.

On 7 January, six yards of damask was allotted for the presentation of the deceased. This most likely covered Maria's face and body. On 8 January, the funeral was held. Maria's coffin was upholstered with crimson English cloth. The funeral was ordered by Prince Bogdan Dolgorukov, her cousin, and the priest Vasily Semyonov. Maria Vladimirovna was buried in the tomb of the Russian tsaristas in the cathedral of the Ascension Convent, behind the left pillar by the western doors. In 1929, the remains of all queens were transferred to the basement chamber of the Archangel Cathedral.

The inscription on her sarcophagus reads:

In the year 7133, on the sixth day of January, on the feast of the Epiphany of our Lord and Savior Jesus Christ, at the ninth hour of the night towards the seventh day, the wife of the right-believing great sovereign, tsar and grand prince Mikhail Fyodorovich of all Russia, the autocrat, the right-believing and noble tsaritsa and grand princess Maria Vladimirovna, passed away, and was buried on the eighth day of January in commemoration of our venerable father George of Choziba and the venerable Domnica.

== Bibliography ==
- Государство и общество в России XV-начала XX века. // Ред. А. П. Павлов. Стр. 254.
- Martin, Russell E. (15 June 2012). A Bride for the Tsar: Bride-Shows and Marriage Politics in Early Modern Russia. Cornell University Press. ISBN 978-1-5017-5665-8.

Russian royalty
Vacant Title last held by Maria Buynosova-Rostovskaya	Tsaritsa consort of Russia; 1624–1625	Vacant Title next held by Eudoxia Streshneva
