= Ivan Susanin =

Russian martyr (died 1613)

Ivan Susanin (Russian: Иван Сусанин, IPA: [ɪˈvan sʊˈsanʲɪn]; died 1613) was a Russian national hero and martyr of the early-17th-century Time of Troubles. According to the popular legend, Polish troops seeking to kill Tsar Mikhail hired Susanin as a guide. Susanin persuaded them to take a secret path through the Russian forests, and neither they nor Susanin were ever heard from again.

== Evidence ==
In 1619, Bogdan Sobinin from the village of Domnino, near Kostroma, received from Tsar Mikhail half of the village of Derevischi. According to the extant royal charter, the lands were granted him to reward his father-in-law, Ivan Susanin, who refused to reveal to the Poles the location of the Tsar.

Subsequent charters (from 1641, 1691 and 1837) diligently repeat the 1619 charter's phrases about Ivan Susanin being "investigated by Polish and Lithuanian people and subjected to incredible and great tortures in order to learn the great tsar's whereabouts but, though aware of that and suffering incredible pains, saying nothing and in revenge for this being tortured to death by the Poles and Lithuanians".

The legend of Susanin's life and death evolved over time. In the early-19th century, the charters attracted the attention of nascent Russian historiography, and Susanin was proclaimed a Russian national hero and a symbol of the Russian peasants' devotion to the tsar. Susanin was officially promoted as a national hero and commemorated in poems and operas, such as Mikhail Glinka's 1836 opera A Life for the Tsar.

== Legend ==
The village of Domnino was owned by Xenia Shestova, the wife of Fyodor Romanov and the mother of Mikhail Romanov. Upon Mikhail's election to the Russian throne in 1613, the Zemsky Sobor sent Prince Vorotynsky and several other boyars to inform Mikhail, who lived in Domnino, about his election.

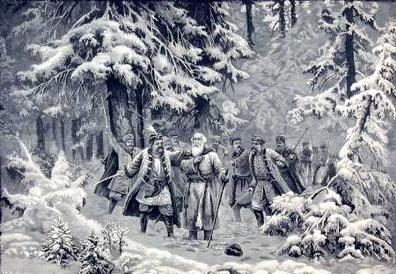
A 19th-century Russian painting representing Susanin's last minutes

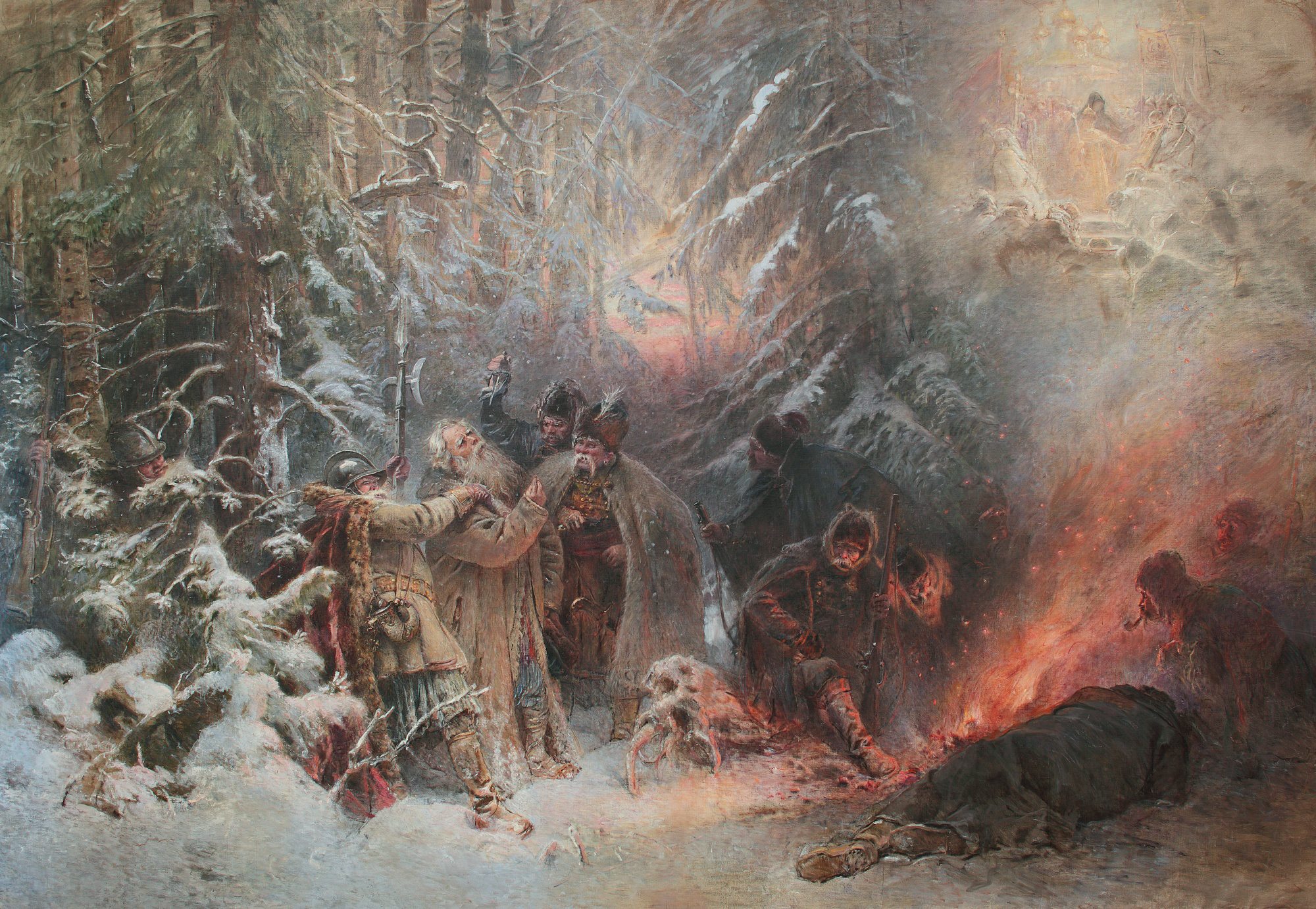
Ivan Susanin (Konstantin Makovsky, 1914)

Many Polish detachments still roamed Russia, however. They supported Sigismund III Vasa, who refused to accept his defeat and still claimed the Russian throne. One of them discovered the news and sent troops to Kostroma to find and to kill the young tsar.

It is said that they were unsure of the road to Domnino and so they started to ask locals for directions. In woods near the village, they met a logger, Ivan Susanin, who promised to take them via a "shortcut" through a forest directly to the Hypatian Monastery, where Mikhail was apparently hiding. His enemies followed Susanin and were never heard from again. It is presumed that Susanin led them so deep into the forest that they could not find a way out and so they perished in the bitter cold February night.

Susanin's son-in-law, whom Susanin had secretly sent ahead via a different route, warned Mikhail, and the monks concealed him from further Polish raids. Mikhail was crowned as tsar, ruled Russia for 32 years and founded the Romanov dynasty.

== Legacy ==
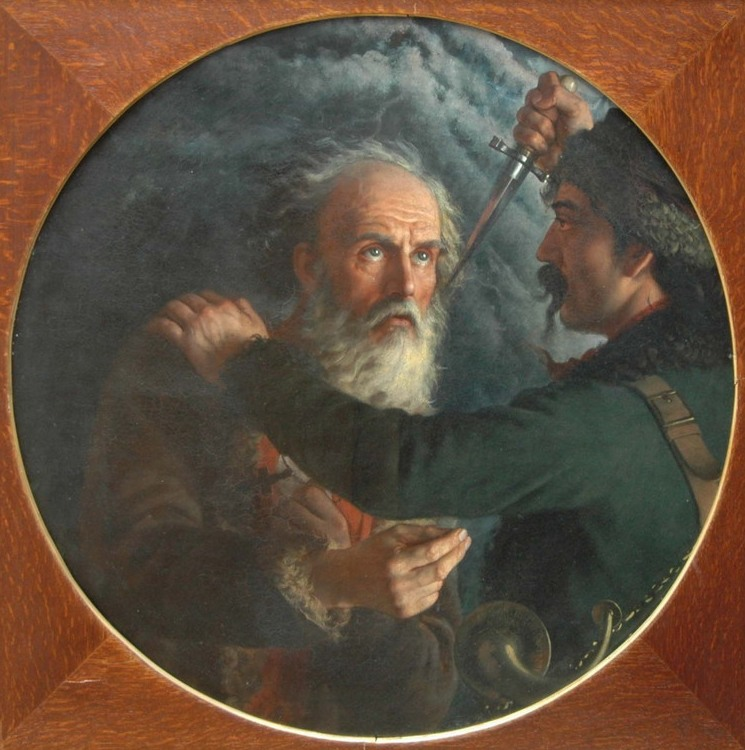
Death of Ivan Susanin, by Mikhail Scotti, 1851.

Stories and images of Ivan Susanin as an iconic Russian patriot inspired many artists, composers and writers, especially in the Russian Empire. Kondraty Ryleyev glorified Susanin's exploits in a poem, and Mikhail Glinka wrote one of the first Russian operas of international renown, "Ivan Susanin", or "A Life for the Tsar". The opera's original title was to be "Ivan Susanin", after the hero, but when Nicholas I attended a rehearsal, Glinka changed the title to "A Life for the Tsar" as an ingratiating gesture. That title was retained in the Russian Empire until the Russian Revolution, when it reverted to "Ivan Susanin". The opera's openly-monarchist libretto was edited to comply with Soviet ideology. The tsar's anthem melody on Tchaikovsky's 1812 finale was, in turn, replaced by the chorus "Glory, glory to you, holy Rus'!" (Славься, славься, святая Русь!), from Glinka's opera.

In 1838, Nicholas I ordered a monument built to Susanin in Kostroma, but it was destroyed by the Bolsheviks, who were offended by statue of the tsar that the monument incorporated. Later, they erected another monument to the hero.

Mykola Kostomarov, a historian opposed to Nicholas' regime, was the first to raise the issue of the legend's doubtful historicity because it was in the Ipatiev Monastery, not Domnino, that Mikhail Romanov lived in 1612. His arguments were dismissed by more orthodox scholars such as Mikhail Pogodin and Sergey Solovyov.

The name "Susanin" has become an ironic cliché in the Russian language for a person who leads somewhere claiming to know the way but eventually proves not to. A famous folk limerick is quoted to invoke the cliche in such situations, which can be translated roughly as: "Ivan Susanin, in what godforsaken trap did we land? / Screw you! I thought I knew the forest like the back of my hand!"

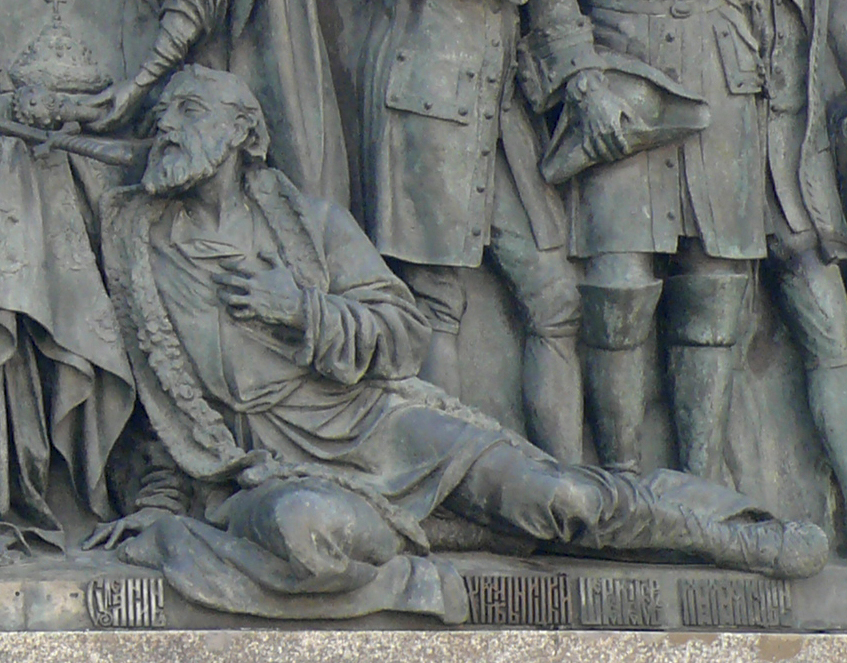
Susanin on the Millennium of Russia monument.

Glinka's opera A Life for the Tsar was featured heavily throughout the Romanov tercentenary celebrations. It was performed in a gala performance at Mariinsky Theatre, Performances were staged throughout Russia by schools, regiments and amateur companies. Pamphlets and the penny press printed the story of Susanin ad nauseam, and one newspaper told how Susanin had shown all soldiers how to fulfill their oath to the sovereign. At the bottom of the Romanov Monument in Kostroma, a female personification of Russia gives blessings to a kneeling Susanin. In Kostroma, Nicholas II was even presented with a group of Potemkin peasants, who claimed to be descendants of Susanin.

== See also ==
- Matvey Kuzmin (1858–1942): the World War II Russian hero who led a German battalion into an ambush, sacrificing himself.

== Sources ==
- Figes, Orlando (2014). A People's Tragedy: The Russian Revolution 1891–1924. London: The Bodley Head. ISBN 9781847922915.
