= Maria Ivanovna Khlopova =

Russian noble

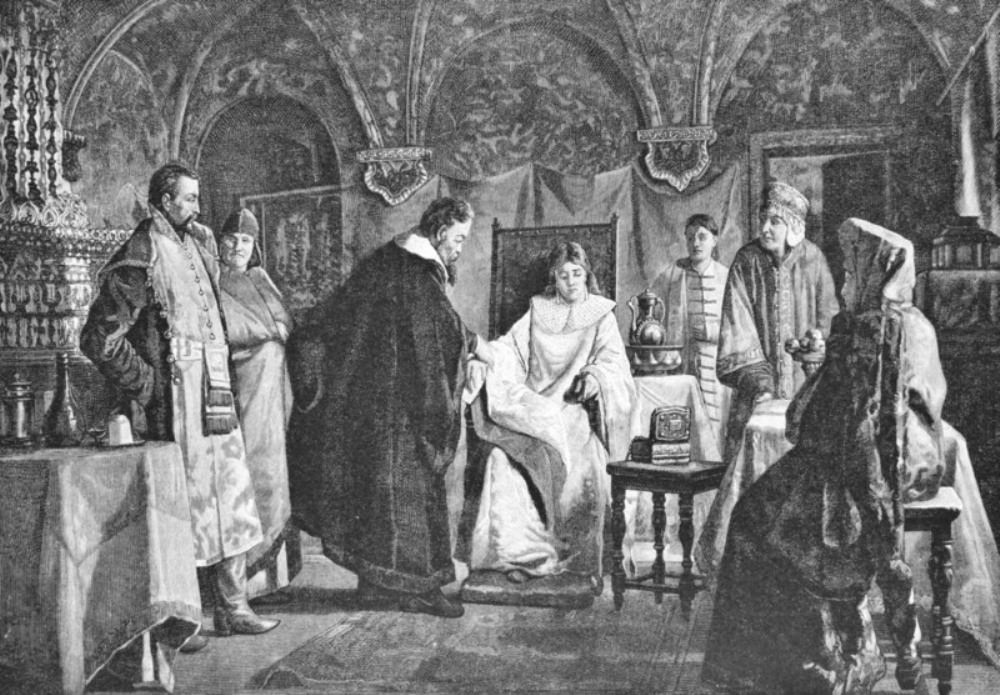
An 1884 portrait of Maria.

Maria Ivanovna Khlopova, known briefly as Anastasia Ivanovna Khlopova (died 1633), was a Russian noble, the fiancée of Tsar Michael I of Russia.

== Biography ==
Maria Ivanovna Khlopova was chosen as a potential bride via a brideshow in 1616, and was brought to live amongst the court, as were her grandmother and aunt. However, despite the Tsar's fondness for Maria, his mother did not like her or her family, and wished for her son to marry one of her own relatives.

During one court function Maria - who had been given the name Anastasia upon coming to court - vomited, collapsed, and soon became violently ill. This caused whispers throughout the court that, despite her apparent good health during the brideshow, she must be inherently ill, and thus likely unfit to bear children for the Tsar. However the truth was that she had simply eaten too many sweets in the Tsar's decadent palace. Some suspected she had been poisoned, which was a great fear in Russian court at the time. Khlopova was put in the care of Mikhail Saltykov, maternal cousin of the Tsar, and strong opponent to Maria's ascension. Saltykov dosed her with potions from the pharmacy causing her to become even more ill. Maria's illness was cited as proof of inability to bear children and she and her family were exiled to Siberia, though her father was later appointed governor of Vologda. The Tsar, who had allegedly become very close to Maria during her six-week stint as Tsarina, swore never to wed.

Even years after she was exiled, Tsar Michael wished to make her his wife. He rejected other potential marriage matches, and finally managed to convince his father, Patriarch Filaret, who had just returned from imprisonment in Poland, to consider Maria again. Filaret sent doctors to investigate and examine Maria in her exile, and they found her to be completely healthy. Filaret and Michael were astounded, and, demanding to know why they had been told Maria suffered from a chronic illness, began a larger inquiry. On further interview, Maria testified that she had vomited only once, until Saltykov had administered a medicine, which caused her extreme sickness.

The Saltykovs barely escaped with their heads, banished. Though Michael hoped he would now be able to marry Maria, his mother still refused to permit it. He was forced to choose another bride, and he married Maria Dolgorukova in 1624.

== Bibliography ==
- П. Мельников. «Мария Ивановна Хлопова, невеста царя Михаила Федоровича» ("Нижегородские Губернские Ведомости", 1845, № 7 и след.)
- Д. Мордовцев. «Русские женщины допетровской Руси»;
- И. Е. Забелин. «Домашний быт русских цариц» (глава 3-я).
