= Tatyana Mikhailovna of Russia =

Russian Tsarevna (1636–1706)

Tsarevna Tatyana Mikhailovna
- Born: 5 January 1636; Moscow, Tsardom of Russia
- Died: 23 August 1706 (aged 70); Moscow, Tsardom of Russia
- Burial: Ascension Convent, Moscow
Names
- Tatyana Mikhailovna Romanova
- House: Romanov
- Father: Michael of Russia
- Mother: Eudoxia Streshneva
- Religion: Russian Orthodoxy

Tatyana Mikhailovna of Russia (Russian: Татьяна Михайловна; 5 January 1636 – 23 August 1706) was a Russian Tsarevna. She was heavily involved with the politics of the Romanov court during the reigns of her brother Alexis and the regency of her niece Sophia.

== Biography ==
Tatyana was born the daughter of Tsar Michael of Russia and Eudoxia Streshneva, and the sister of Tsar Aleksei I of Russia.

In contemporary Muscovite custom, Russian princesses were completely secluded from the world outside of the women's quarters of the terem, not allowed contact with men nor allowed to marry. As they were not permitted to marry a non-Orthodox nor a partner below their social status, and there were no Orthodox Kingdoms other than Russia at the time, daughters of the tsar were expected never to marry, nor have any contact with men outside of the family during their life. Tsarevnas attended church and even official state processions covered by screens, and made their pilgrimages to convents in covered sleighs and wagons, as was in fact the custom for all Russian noblewomen at the time.

Tatyana followed these rules, but she was also able to exert some degree of influence at court. She was known as a supporter of the reforms of Patriarch Nikon of Moscow. She had a good relationship with her brother tsar Alexei.

== Sophia's regency ==
During the regency of her niece Sophia, she reportedly exercised some degree of influence at court, where she was treated as the senior female member at court in etiquette matters and given precedence by regent Sophia before the dowager Tsaritsa Natalya.

When Sophia was deposed by tsar Peter the Great in 1689, Foy de la Neuville reported that Sophia sent her sister, Tsarevna Marfa, and aunts, Anna and Tatyana, to mediate. Tatyana tried to mediate and prevent Peter from imprisoning her niece Tsarevna Marfa in a convent, but without success; she lost her influence as Peter's reforms progressed society from the old way and the old court.

== Death ==
Tatyana died in the early hours of 24 August 1706, and was interred at Ascension Convent near the Spassky Gate in Moscow on the same day. In 1930, her sarcophagus was moved to the basement of the Kremlin's Cathedral of the Archangel. When archaeologists opened her sarcophagus, her body was found dressed in green Chinese silks.
