= Shenderov House =

Historic house in Russia

Coordinates: 47°13′14″N 39°43′09″E

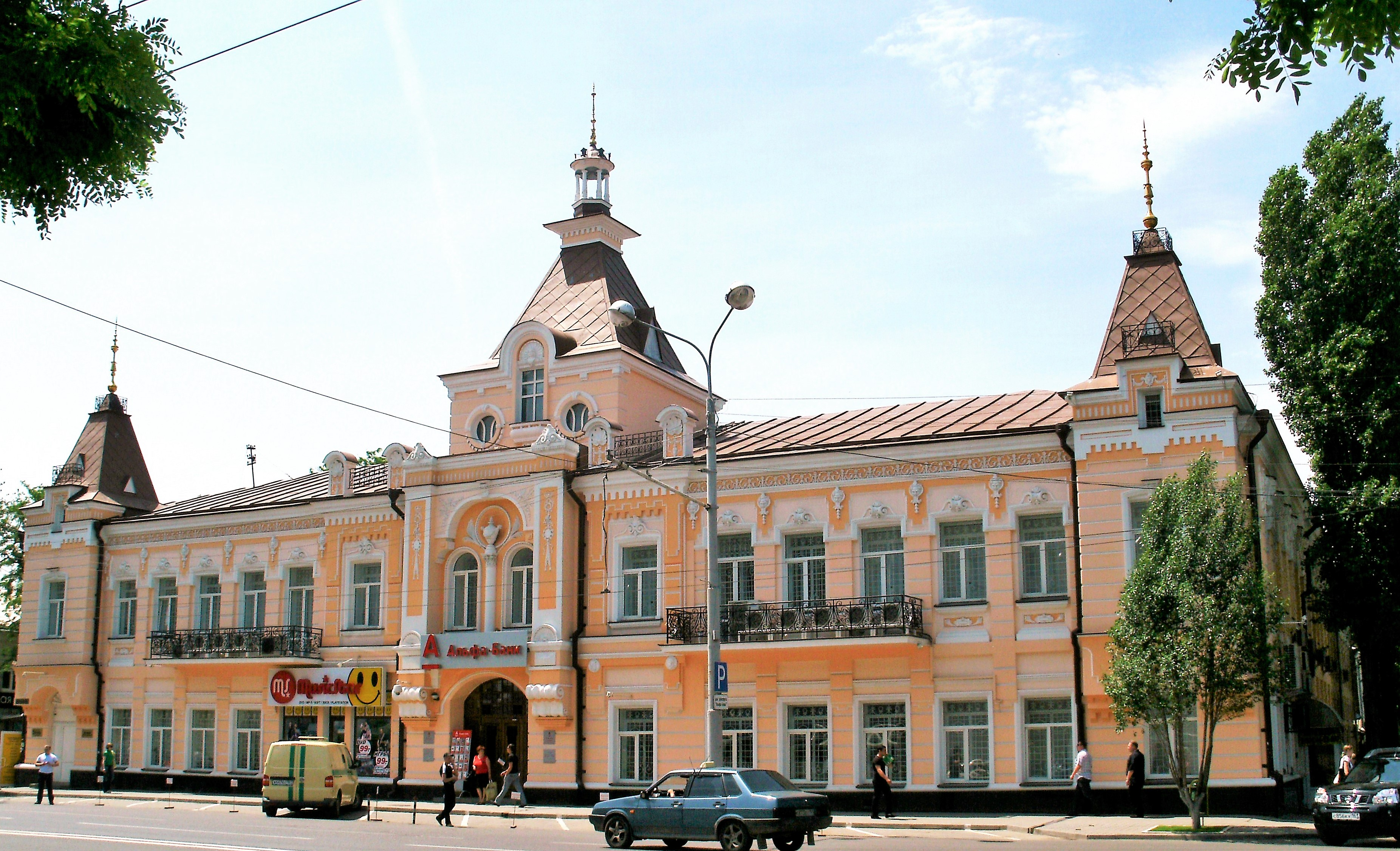
Shenderov house

The Shenderov House (Russian: Дом Шендерова, romanized: Dom Shenderova) is a historic house in Rostov-on-Don and is today the Alfa-Bank branch. The house is located at 33 Voroshilovsky avenue (Russian: Ворошиловский проспект, 33) in the Kirovsky District of Rostov-on-Don. The building is also considered to be an object of cultural heritage.

== History ==
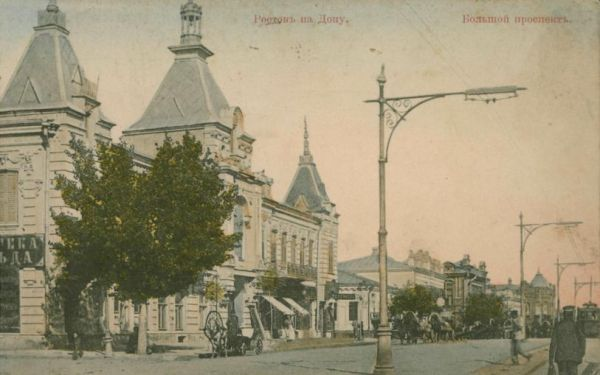
The Shenderov House in the early 1900s

The house was built at the end of 19th century. It was designed by Rostov architect Nikolay Sokolov. The house belonged to a merchant of the second guild Solomon Izrailivech Shenderov. The first floor of central section was rented by different commercial organizations. Dwellings and presence chamber were on the second floor. Rental apartment were located at the side avant-corps.

The Shenderov House was nationalized after the establishment of the Soviet rule. The nationalised building was taken over by trade organizations and multifamily units. The house has been damaged during the Great Patriotic war. The central tabernacle has been lost. The building was restored according to a project of architects M. Ishunin and G. Petrov.

The second reconstruction was held in the 2000s. The central taberlance was restored again to its historic appearance. Now Alfa bank occupied the Shenderov House.

== Description ==
The trapezoidal two-storey building features a combination of elements of Russian Revival architecture. The roof is reminiscent of the Russian Terem, an early 17th-century structure. Attics with taberlances crown central and side sections. The facade is decorated with banded rustication, herma, sculpted garland and wreaths.
