= Patriarch Filaret =

Patriarch Filaret may refer to:

- Patriarch Filaret of Moscow (Feodor Nikitich Romanov, 1553–1633)
- Filaret Denysenko (1929–2026), Patriarch of the Ukrainian Orthodox Church – Kyiv Patriarchate
