= Tatiana of Russia =

Tatiana of Russia may refer to:

- Tatyana Mikhailovna of Russia (1636–1706), daughter of Michael of Russia
- Princess Tatiana Constantinovna of Russia (1890–1979), daughter of Grand Duke Constantine Constantinovich
- Grand Duchess Tatiana Nikolaevna of Russia (1897–1918), daughter of Nicholas II
