= Patriarch Joseph I =

Patriarch Joseph I may refer to:

- Joseph I of Constantinople, Ecumenical Patriarch in 1266–1275 and 1282–1283
- Patriarch Joseph of Moscow and All Russia, ruled in 1642–1652
- Joseph I (Chaldean Patriarch) (reigned in 1681–1696)
