= Patriarch Joseph of Moscow =

Patriarch of Moscow

Joseph
- Patriarch of Moscow and all the Rus'
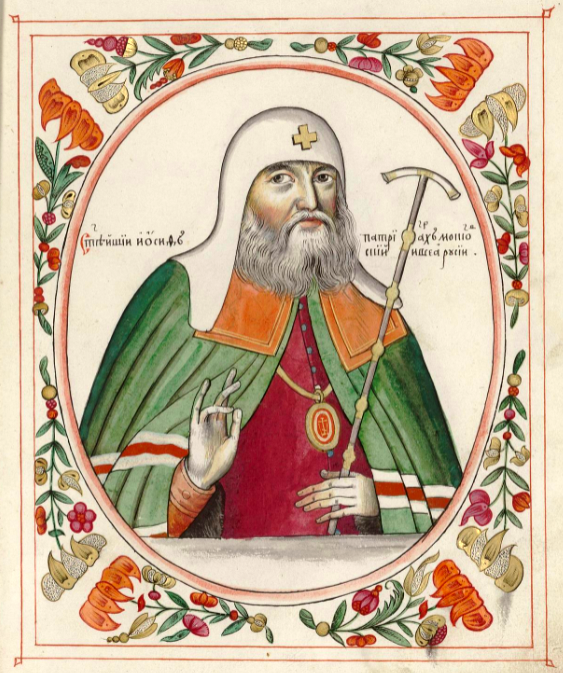
- Portrait in the Tsarsky titulyarnik, 1672
- Church: Russian Orthodox Church
- See: Moscow
- Installed: 27 March 1642
- Term ended: 15 April 1652
- Predecessor: Joasaphus I
- Successor: Nikon

Personal details
- Born: Ignaty Dyakov unknown Vladimir, Tsardom of Russia
- Died: 15 April 1652
- Buried: Dormition Cathedral, Moscow

Joseph (Russian: Иосиф; secular name Ignaty Dyakov, Russian: Игнатий Дьяков; died 15 April [O.S. 5 April] 1652) was the sixth Patriarch of Moscow and All Russia, elected after an unusual one and a half year break.

== Biography ==
The early life of Joseph is unclear. Before the election he was an archimandrite of the Simonov Monastery.

=== Patriarchate ===
For the first time the patriarch was elected by sortition from candidates offered by tsar Mikhail Fyodorovich in coordination with the Council of Bishops. The election was held on 20 March 1642 in Moscow. Joseph came into office on March 27 and was titled "master" and not "sovereign" (as his predecessor Filaret had been).

Joseph conducted a fairly conservative policy. When Danish prince Valdemar Christian arrived to Moscow in 1644 Joseph began persuading him to adopt Orthodoxy because Valdemar was married to tsarevna Irina Romanova. When Valdemar refused, Joseph opened the debate on 2 June 1644. The debate was limited mainly to the fulfilment of the christening but Orthodox scholars couldn't competently prove their opinion. In 1650 Joseph opened another debate, on Russian and Greek Orthodoxy with Paisius I, the Patriarch of Jerusalem.

He took measures to build school in Moscow, which subscribed to the scientists from Kiev.

He cared about the improvement of the beauty of churches and church services, and participated at the dedication of the Church of Elijah the Prophet in Yaroslavl in 1650, and brought a gift of a new piece of the robe of the Lord Church.

Attempts were made during Joseph's reign to introduce the so-called "narechnoye singing" ("наречное пение") instead of khomonic singing, with Patriarch Nikon afterwards fully introducing it.

He ordered to publish printed "Instructions" to the priests, lay people and a number of other messages. Joseph's period as Patriarch marked an intense publishing activity and the recovery of church thought (Moscow circle Zealots of Piety). Religious books published under Joseph, were the last to reflect donikonovskie editorial texts and rituals. Therefore, they are highly valued and subsequently were reprinted.

Inn early 1649 the patriarch Joseph called Church Council, whose members condemned the opponents polyphony when both were committed in different places different parts of the temple worship. For example, in one spot read the Six Psalms, in another - kathisma, in the third - the canon or any sung verses. However, the initiator of this case was the Metropolitan of Novgorod, Nikon, who in his last years of the patriarch Joseph, great influence in Moscow and managed the affairs of the church. Meanwhile, Tsar Alexei Mikhailovich supported his confessor and approved to send him a conciliar act. Moreover, he denied the patriarch in the demand to punish Stephen Vonifateva for public reproach swear words of the patriarch and members of the "consecrated the cathedral."

He died on Maundy Thursday, 15 April 1652, before the arrival in Moscow of the relics of Metropolitan Philip of Moscow. He was buried in the Moscow Dormition Cathedral next to the tomb of the first patriarch Job, in the place which he pointed out shortly before his death.

After the death of the patriarch Joseph left a large sum of cash, which he gathered, wanting to buy land ownership. Testament patriarch Joseph did not leave, and all his savings, according to the king were mainly distributed to monasteries and churches.

Eastern Orthodox Church titles
Preceded by Joasaphus I	Patriarch of Moscow; 1642–1652	Succeeded by Nikon
