= 1616 Russian brideshow =

Russian Brideshow

- Part of Reign of Tsar Michael
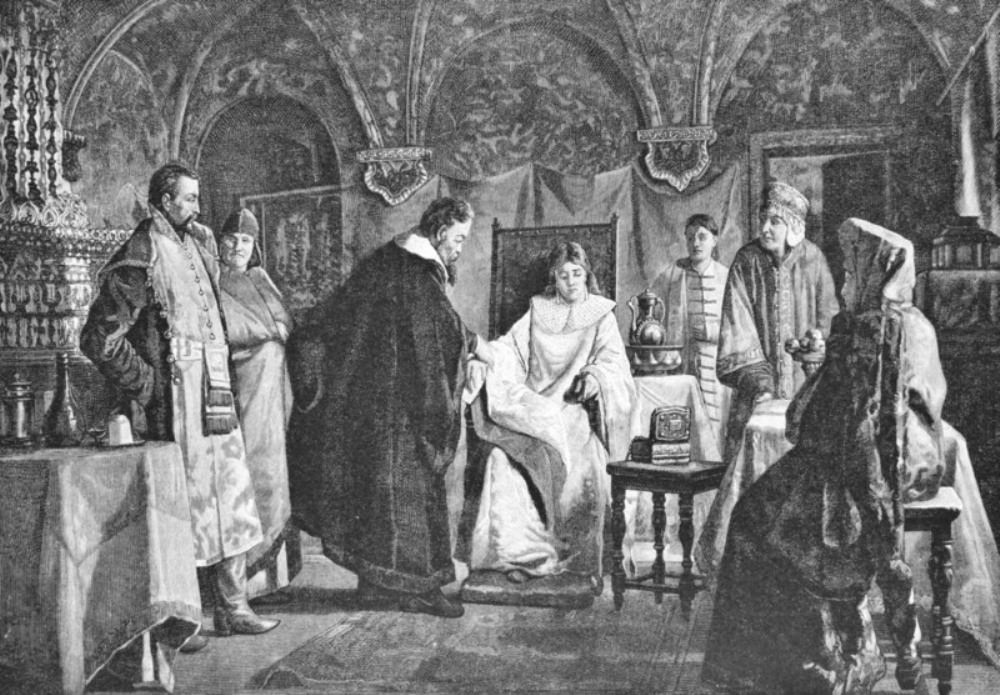
- Maria Ivanovna Khlopova, as depicted by Nikolai Nevrev in 1884
- Date: December 1616
- Location: Moscow, Russia
- Outcome: Maria Ivanovna Khlopova becomes engaged to Michael of Russia, but is deported to Siberia shortly afterwards due to presumed infertility

The 1616 Russian brideshow was held in December 1616 to select the bride of Tsar Michael of Russia. Out of nearly 500 women, Maria Kholpova was selected by the Tsar to be his wife. She adopted the title Tsarina and changed her name to Anastasia. However, the couple could not engage due to Khlopova's suspected infertility.

== Background ==
At the age of 19 in 1615, Tsar Michael of Russia called for a brideshow in order to select his wife. The following year, courtiers were sent across the kingdom in order to locate teenage virgins of predominantly middle-gentry families and house them in Moscow until the brideshow could be held.

In Russia, Tsars often wished to marry beneath them in order to avoid siding with various court factions. However, these shows were often rigged and manipulated by boyars to limit the girls shown to the Tsar.

== Selection ==
Out of an estimated 500 women found across Russia, 60 (Note: Some estimates put this number as low as 10) managed to pass initial inspection of a jury consisting of doctors and courtiers. Court officials also conducted checks into the family history of participants. The second stage was known as the "smortriny" or "viewing" where the Tsar and the Head of the Great Court Office would limit the number of candidates down to six while giving those rejected various presents. Finally, the Tsar made his choice by handing Maria Kholpova a handkerchief and a golden ring.

== Aftermath ==
After the brideshow had concluded, Anastasia suddenly began to vomit and fainted before the entire court. Initially believed to be the result of her eating too many sweets, it was later revealed to be a case of poisoning, likely committed by the Tsar's mother, Xenia Shestova. After six weeks of intensive care, the girl was presumed to be infertile by Court Doctors and was sent to Siberia along with her family and her father was forced out the court, being appointed the Governor of Voldaga.
