= Maria Buynosova-Rostovskaya =

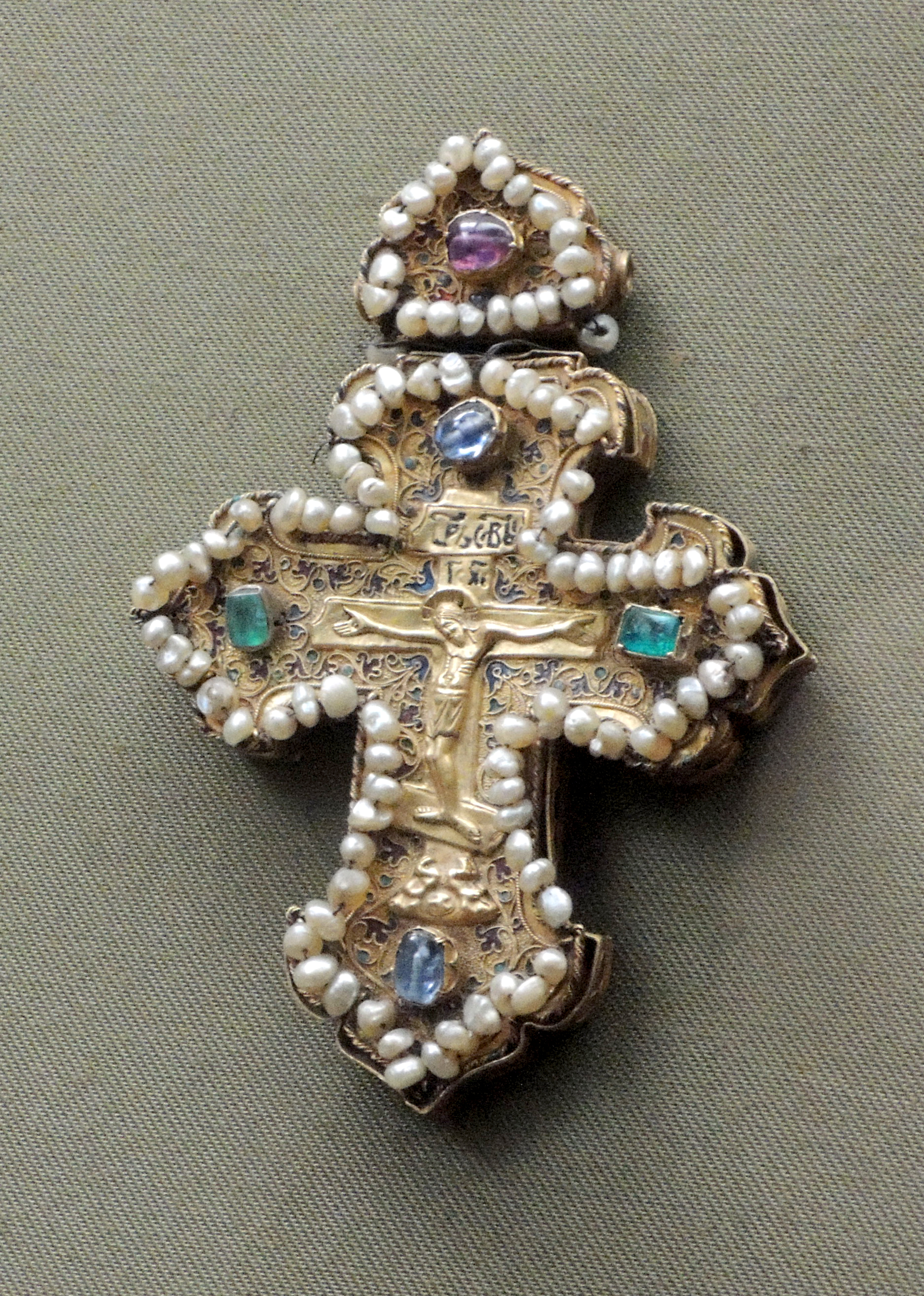

Tsaritsa of All Russia
- Tenure: 1608–1610
- Predecessor: Marina Mniszech
- Successor: Maria Dolgorukova
- Born: 1590s/c. 1586
- Died: 2 January 1626; Novodevichy Convent
- Burial: Archangel Cathedral, Kremlin; prev. Novodevichy Convent
- Spouse: Vasili IV of Russia
- Issue: Tsarevna Anna Vasilievna Tsarevna Anastasia Vasilievna
- Father: Pyotr Ivanovich Buynosov-Rostovsky
- Mother: Maria Ivanovna
- Religion: Eastern Orthodox

Maria Petrovna Buynosova-Rostovskaya (Буйносова-Ростовская, Мария Петровна in Russian) died 2 January 1626) was the second spouse and only tsarina consort of Tsar Vasili IV of Russia.

== Life ==
Maria Buynosova-Rostovskaya, originally named Yekaterina (Catherine) comes from the extinct princely House of Buynosov-Rostovsky. She was the daughter of prince Pyotr Buynosov-Rostovsky, and related to the Nagoi family. The wedding to Vasili IV took place on 17 January, 1608.

She and Vasili had two children, Anna and Anastasia.

In 1610, Vasili - a boyar who had overthrown the previous claimant to the throne, the 'false Dimitri' - was deposed. After the deposition of her consort, Maria was forced to enter a convent, Novodevichy. As a nun, she took the name Elena. Her youngest daughter, by then newborn, joined her into the exile.

Maria died at the Pokrovski, convent in 1625.

Issue

1. Tsarevna Anna Vasilievna (1609-1609)
2. Tsarevna Anastasia Vasilievna (1610-year of death unknown, but before mother's death)

Russian royalty
Vacant Title last held by Marina Mniszech	Tsaritsa consort of Russia; 1608–1610	Vacant Title next held by Maria Dolgorukova
