= Patriarch Joasaphus I of Moscow =

Patriarch of Moscow

Joasaphus
- Patriarch of Moscow and all the Rus'
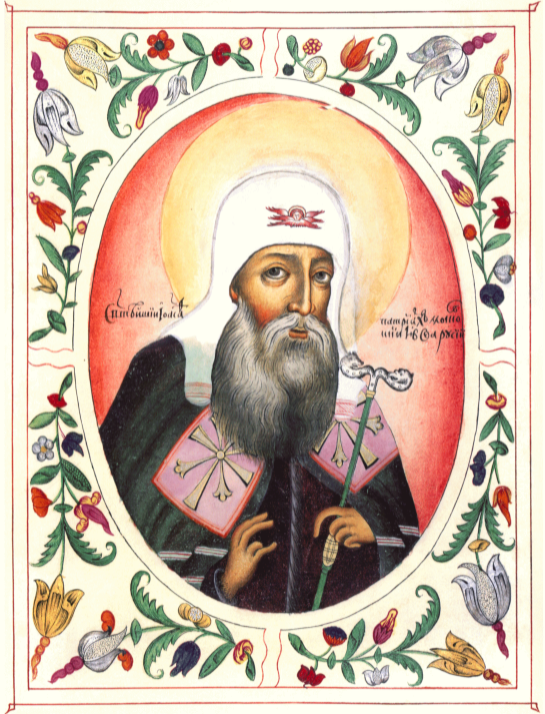
- Portrait in the Tsarsky titulyarnik, 1672
- Church: Russian Orthodox Church
- See: Moscow
- Installed: 1634
- Term ended: 1640
- Predecessor: Filaret
- Successor: Joseph

Personal details
- Born: Tsardom of Russia
- Died: 28 November 1640
- Buried: Dormition Cathedral, Moscow

Joasaphus I (Russian: Иоасаф I, romanized: Ioasaf I; ? – 28 November 1640, Moscow) was the fifth Patriarch of Moscow and All Russia (1634–1640).

== Biography ==
Joasaphus took monastic vows in Solovetsky Monastery. In 1621, he became a hegumen at Pskovo-Pechorsky Monastery. In January 1627, Joasaphus was appointed archbishop of Pskov and Velikiye Luki. He is known for his protection of Pskov's trade privileges and resistance to pretensions of the German merchants, for which he would be punished by the patriarch.

=== Patriarch of Moscow ===
Upon Philaret's death in 1634, Joasaphus was appointed his successor, upon his recommendation. His selection to the role of Patriarch was held in the traditional way: The Council of Bishops of the Russian Orthodox Church (knowing in advance the will of Mikhaill Romanov) pointed to three candidates, of whom the Tsar could choose. Enthronement of the new Primate of the Russian Orthodox Church was held, also in keeping with tradition, in the Cathedral of the Dormition of the Mother of God in the Kremlin in Moscow on 6 February 1634.

One of Joasaphus' first deeds was severe punishment of Joseph Kurtsevich, Archbishop of Suzdal, for his indecent behaviour. He took part in reviving Moscow's printing activities. They published 23 ecclesiastic books under his supervision. In 1636, Joasaphus wrote Память (Pamyat, or memo), in which he urged Russian clergymen to settle all the discords between themselves. He also published a piece called Лестница властям (Lestnitsa vlastyam, or Hierarchy of power), in which he explained the hierarchy of clergymen during divine services and sobors. Also, Joasaphus published the so-called Требник (Trebnik, or book of prayers) with a supplement of Philaret's resolutions and decrees.

As Patriarch, he did not interfere in affairs of state policy and refused to even granting the tsar advice in this regard, thereby the strengthening process the position of the Patriarchate in the country declined. He focused instead on efforts to moral renewal of society. He aimed for the effective implementation of the provisions of the Council of the Hundred Chapters in terms of arrangement of worship, opposed the custom of simultaneous execution of several passages of worship at the same time and false jurodiwych. Joasaphus I is buried in the Cathedral of the Dormition in the Moscow Kremlin.

== Legacy ==
Most historians assess Josaphus as a colorless figure. According to the historian Parsley such determination activities of the patriarch is unfair, because the lack of interest of Josaphus for state affairs did not mean lack of involvement in the problems of the Orthodox Church, where the latter showed the energy and determination. Parsley also points out that the relatively short period of office of the patriarch by Joazafa results in the obfuscation of his achievements by the much more well-known and strong personalities of the two other seventeenth-century Russian Orthodox Church superiors: Filaret and Nikon. At the same time the authors of works devoted to Josaphus give it a raw ascetic, pious and humble man.

Eastern Orthodox Church titles
Preceded by Philaret	Patriarch of Moscow; 1634–1640	Succeeded by Joseph
