= Michael of Russia =

Tsar of Russia from 1613 to 1645

Michael I
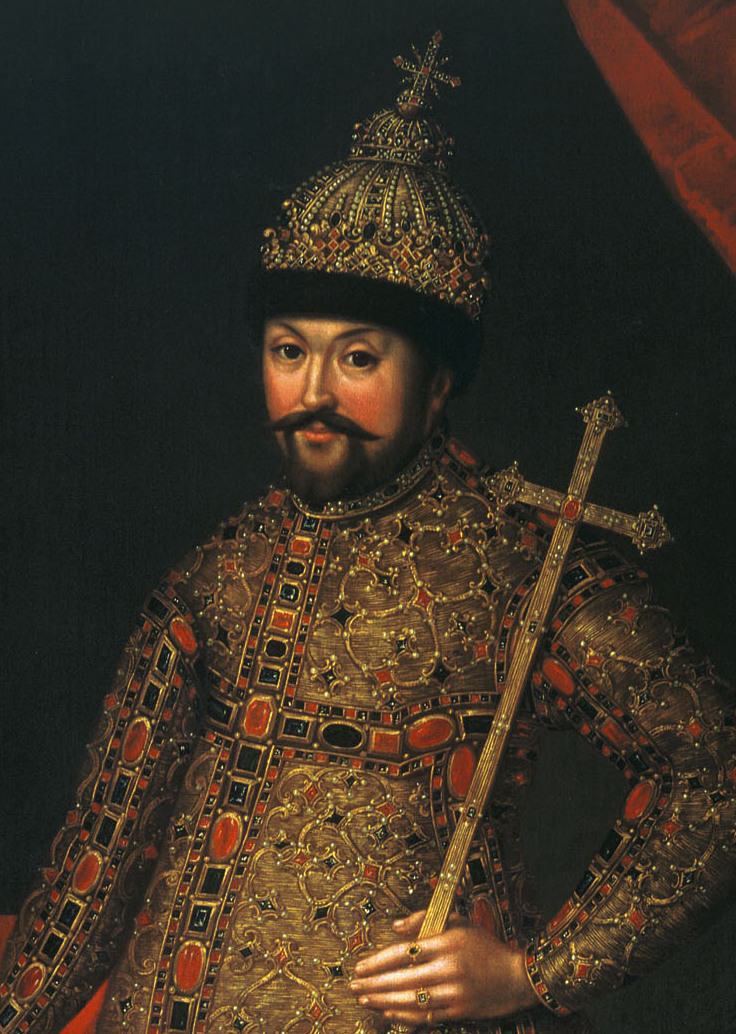
- Johann Heinrich Wedekind's copy of a portrait, 1636

Tsar of all Russia
- Reign: 3 March [O.S. 21 February] 1613 – 23 July [O.S. 13 July] 1645
- Coronation: 11 July 1613
- Predecessor: Vladislav (de jure, disputed); Dmitry Troubetskoy (as the head of the Zemsky government); Vasili IV of Russia (previous crowned Tsar)
- Successor: Alexis
- Born: 22 July 1596; Moscow, Russia
- Died: 23 July 1645 (aged 49); Moscow, Russia
- Burial: Cathedral of the Archangel
- Spouses: Maria Vladimirovna Dolgorukova (m. 1624; died 1625) Eudoxia Lukyanovna Streshneva (m. 1626)
- Issue among others...: Tsarevna Irina Mikhailovna; Alexis I; Tsarevna Anna Mikhailovna; Tsarevna Tatiana Mikhailovna
Names
- Mikhail Fyodorovich Romanov
- House: Romanov
- Father: Feodor Nikitich Romanov
- Mother: Kseniya Shestova
- Religion: Russian Orthodox

Michael I (Russian: Михаил Фёдорович Романов, romanized: Mikhail Fyodorovich Romanov; 22 July [O.S. 12 July] 1596 – 23 July [O.S. 13 July] 1645) was Tsar of all Russia from 1613 after being elected by the Zemsky Sobor of 1613 until his death in 1645. He was the first tsar of the House of Romanov, which succeeded the House of Rurik following the Time of Troubles.

He was the son of Feodor Nikitich Romanov (later known as Patriarch Filaret) and of Xenia Shestova. He was also a first cousin once removed of Feodor I, the last tsar of the Rurik dynasty, through his great-aunt Anastasia Romanovna, who was the mother of Feodor I and first wife of Ivan the Terrible.

His accession marked the end of the Time of Troubles. The Ingrian and Polish–Muscovite Wars were brought to an end in 1617 and 1618 respectively, with continued Russian independence confirmed at the expense of territorial losses in the west. Polish king Władysław IV Vasa finally agreed to formally give up his claim to the Russian throne with the Treaty of Polyanovka in 1634. To the east, Cossacks made unprecedented advances in the conquest of Siberia, and Russian explorers had reached the Pacific Ocean (Sea of Okhotsk) by the end of Michael's reign.

== Life and reign ==
Michael's grandfather, Nikita, was brother to the first Russian Tsaritsa Anastasia and a central advisor to Ivan the Terrible. As a young boy, Michael and his mother had been exiled to Beloozero in 1600. This was a result of the recently elected Tsar Boris Godunov, in 1598, falsely accusing his father, Feodor, of treason. This may have been partly because Feodor had married Ksenia Shestova against Boris's wishes.

=== Election ===
Michael was eventually chosen for the throne of Muscovy due to his father's martyr-like captivity in Polish detention, as the patriotic mood swept the Russian elite after the expulsion of the Poles during the Time of Troubles. Michael's youth also contributed to his election as he was seen as easily manipulated. On 21 February 1613, 700 delegates reached a consensus for Michael to be chosen as a compromise candidate as Tsar of Russia by the Zemsky Sobor of 1613.

The delegates of the council did not discover the young Tsar and his mother at the Ipatiev Monastery near Kostroma until 24 March. He had been chosen after several other options had been removed, including Polish prince Vladislav, Austrian Archduke Maximilian III and the Swedish prince Carl Philip. Initially, Martha protested, believing and stating that her son was too young and tender for so difficult an office, and in such a troublesome time.

According to Dunning, "The sixteen-year-old boy did not impress the boyars at all; he was poorly educated and not particularly intelligent. Nonetheless, those great lords consoled themselves with the knowledge that Trubetskoi would not become tsar and that Mikhail's ambitious and highly intelligent father, Filaret, was still in Polish captivity. One of the boyars allegedly said at the time, 'Let us have Misha Romanov for he is young and not yet wise; he will suit our purposes.' In fact, under the strong influence of reactionary boyars, even in preparation for his coronation, the deeply conservative new tsar revealed his true feelings about his subjects by snubbing many patriots simply because they were commoners." The tsar's family relationship with False Dmitry I, False Dmitry II, and Prince Władysław was covered up, even the two years Mikhail spent in the Polish-occupied Kremlin with his collaborator uncle Ivan Romanov.

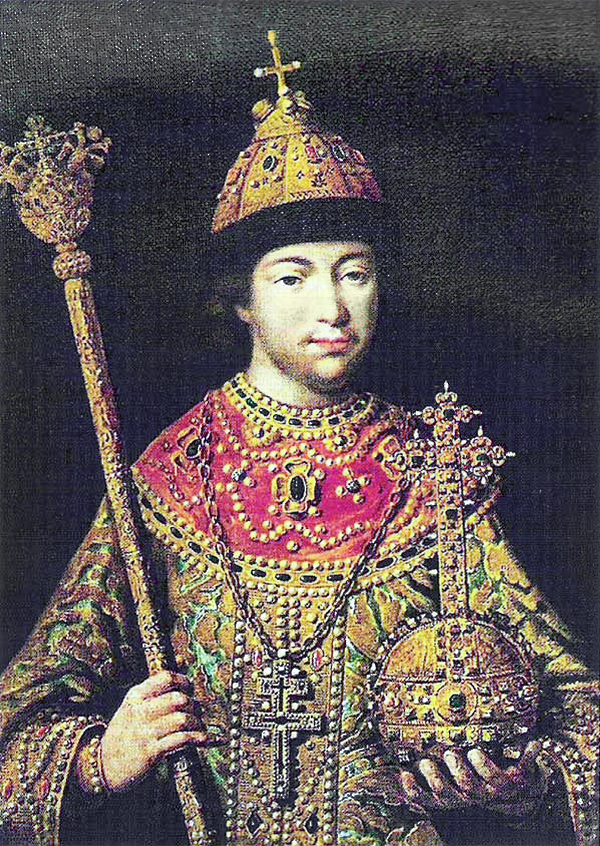
Michael at a young age

Michael's election and accession to the throne form the basis of the Ivan Susanin legend, which Russian composer Mikhail Glinka dramatized in his opera A Life for the Tsar.

In so dilapidated a condition was the capital at this time that Michael had to wait for several weeks at the Troitsa monastery, 75 miles (121 km) off, before decent accommodation could be provided for him at Moscow. He was crowned on 21 July 1613, on his seventeenth birthday. The first task of the new tsar was to clear the land of the countries occupying it. Sweden and Poland were then dealt with respectively by the peace of Stolbovo (17 February 1617) and the Truce of Deulino (1 December 1618).

The most important result of the Truce of Deulino was the return from Polish captivity of the Tsar's father, Patriarch Filaret. Filaret became the effective ruler of Russia until his death in 1633.

=== Reign ===
Russian territory in Siberia (green) in 1636

In the Treaty of Stolbovo (1617) that ended the Ingrian War with Sweden, Russia gave up Ingria and parts of Karelia as well as claims on the duchies of Estonia and Livonia, but in return Sweden recognised Michael as the rightful ruler of Russia. The Truce of Deulino of 1618 (which ended the Polish–Muscovite War (1605–1618) in which Polish forces had once entered Moscow in 1610 and declared Władysław Vasa as Tsar of Russia) saw the loss of Smolensk in exchange for the release of Michael's father Feodor from Polish captivity. A year later, Feodor became Patriarch Filaret of Moscow, or rather was confirmed in the position to which he was previously controversially named by the pretender False Dmitriy II. Filaret subsequently began to play a large role in the ruling of Russia, lasting until his death in 1633. Russia failed to recover Smolensk from the Poles in a later war from 1632 to 1634, but did achieve Władysław Vasa's renunciation of his long-standing claims to the Russian throne. Smolensk would officially remain part of the Polish–Lithuanian Commonwealth until it was recovered with the conclusion of another war under Michael's son and successor Alexis in 1667.

Michael's reign saw some of the greatest territorial expansion in Russian history. During his reign, the conquest of Siberia continued, largely accomplished by the Cossacks and financed by the Stroganov merchant family. In 1638, Michael made Pyotr Golovin the first governor (voivode) of Lensky Ostrog, a Russian frontier fortress in what is now the Sakha Republic, the largest federal subject of Russia by area.

Tsar Michael suffered from a progressive leg injury (a consequence of a horse accident early in his life), which resulted in his not being able to walk towards the end of his life. He was a gentle and pious prince who gave little trouble to anyone and effaced himself behind his counsellors. Sometimes they were relatively honest and capable men like his father; sometimes they were corrupted and bigoted, like the Saltykov relatives of his mother.

Tsar Michael fell ill in April 1645, with scurvy, dropsy, and probably depression. His doctors prescribed purgatives which did not improve his condition; and after fainting in church on 12 July, he died on 23 July 1645.

=== Marriages and issue ===
He was married three times. He first became engaged to Maria Ivanovna Khlopova via a brideshow in 1616, where she changed her name to Anastasia. She quickly grew ill and after six weeks of marriage, was deported to Siberia. Michael maintained a strong affection towards her and vowed to never marry.

He was married off to Princess Maria Vladimirovna Dolgorukova in 1624, but she became ill, and died in early 1625, only four months after the marriage.

In 1626, he married Eudoxia Streshneva (1608–1645), who bore him 10 children, of whom four reached adulthood: the future Tsar Alexis and the Tsarevnas Irina, Anna, and Tatyana. Michael's failure to wed his eldest daughter, Irina, with Count Valdemar Christian of Schleswig-Holstein, a morganatic son of King Christian IV of Denmark, in consequence of the refusal of the latter to accept Orthodoxy, so deeply afflicted him as to contribute to bringing about his death.

== Michael's governments ==
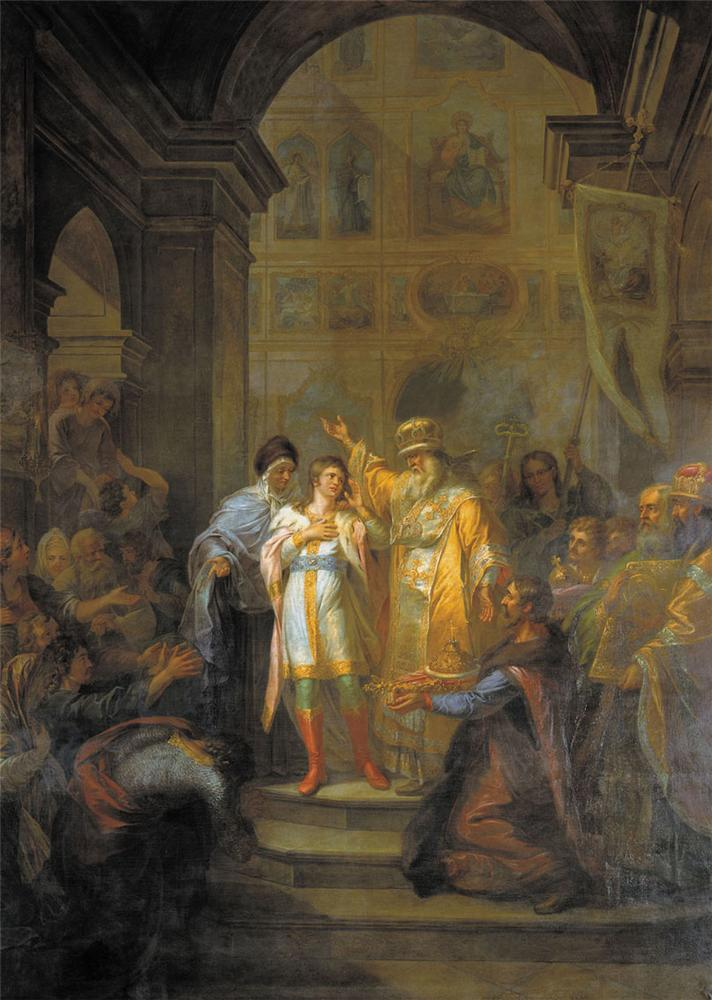
Sixteen-year-old Michael being offered the crown at the Ipatiev Monastery in 1613, painting by Grigory Ugryumov

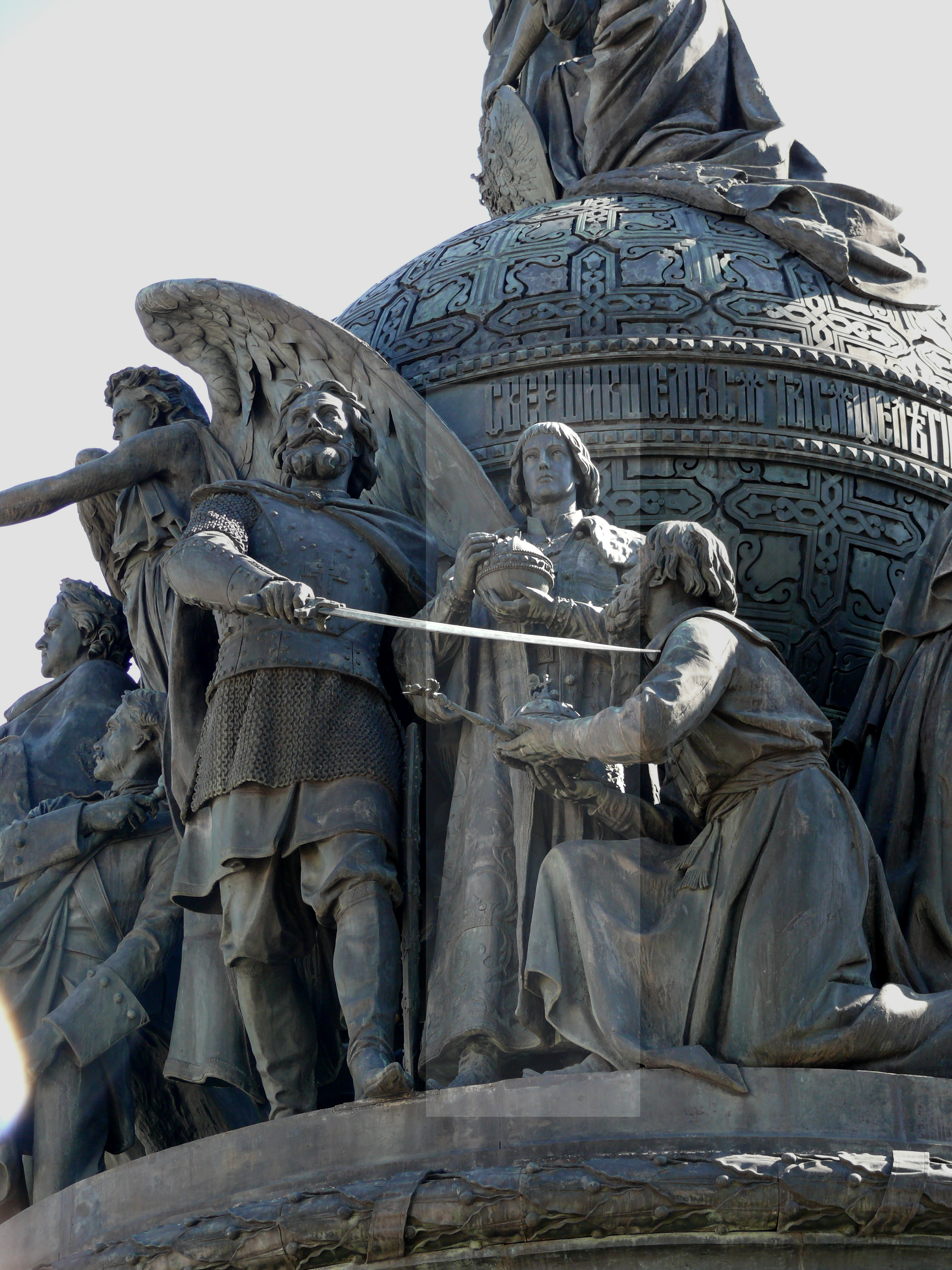
Michael offered Monomakh's Cap and scepter by Kuzma Minin, protected by Dmitry Pozharsky

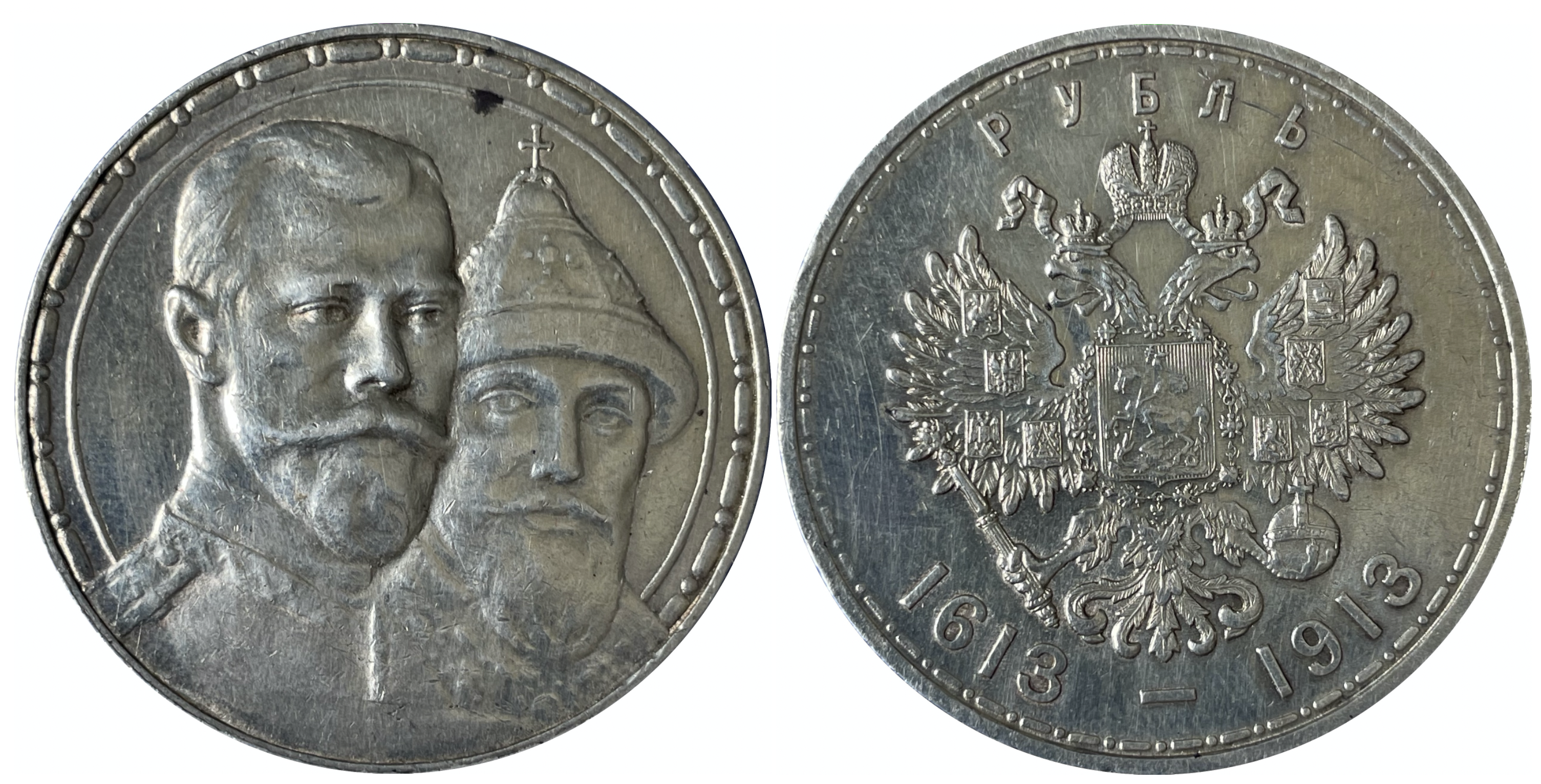
Silver coin: 1 ruble depicting Nikolai II Romanov (1913). On the obverse of the coin features two rulers: left Emperor Nikolai II in military uniform of the life guards of the 4th infantry regiment of the Imperial family, right Michael I in Royal robes and Monomakh's Cap. Portraits made in a circular frame around of a Greek ornament.

The two government offices (prikazes) that were most important politically were the Posolsky Prikaz ("Foreign Office") and the Razryadny Prikaz (a Duma chancellery and a personnel department for both central and provincial administration including military command). Those offices could be pivotal in struggles between boyar factions, so they were traditionally headed not by boyars but by dyaki (professional clerks).

The first head of the Posolsky Prikaz under Michael was Pyotr Tretyakov until his death in 1618; he conducted a policy of allying with Sweden against Poland. The next, Ivan Gramotin had a reputation for being a Polonophile; this appointment was necessary to bring forth Filaret's release from captivity. In the mid-1620s Filaret began preparations for war with Poland; Gramotin fell into disfavour and was dismissed and exiled in 1626. The same fate was shared by Efim Telepnev in 1630 and Fyodor Likhachov in 1631 – they too tried to mitigate Filaret's belligerent approach. Ivan Gryazev, appointed in 1632, was promoted from the second rank of the bureaucracy to carry out Filaret's orders. After the deaths of Filaret and Gryazev, the post was once again assumed by Gramotin in 1634, and after his retirement in 1635, by Likhachov, who undertook a general course of pacification.

The Razryadny Prikaz was first headed by Sydavny Vasilyev; Filaret replaced him with his fellow in captivity Tomilo Lugovskoy, but the latter somehow provoked Filaret's anger and was sent into exile. In 1623, Fyodor Likhachov was appointed head of the prikaz until his move to the Posolsky Prikaz, and, in 1630, the Razryad was given to Ivan Gavrenev, an outstanding administrator who held this post for 30 years.

Three other key offices were the Streletsky Prikaz (in charge of the streltsy, regiments who served as Moscow's garrison), the Prikaz bolshoy kazny, minister of the treasury, and the Aptekarsky Prikaz ("Pharmacy Office", a de facto ministry of health, most particularly the tsar's health). After Filaret's arrival, their former heads were sent away from Moscow, and all three given to Ivan Cherkassky (Filaret's nephew), who proved to be an able and competent administrator and was a de facto prime minister until his death in 1642. Fyodor Sheremetev, who had succeeded to all of Cherkassky's posts was a rather weak figure; real power lay in the hands of a court marshal, Alexey Lvov.

== Issue ==
From his third marriage of 1626 to Eudoxia Streshneva, Michael fathered the following 10 children, but according to Physician Samuel Collins, Tsar Alexis had an older brother who died young.

Name	Birth	Death
Tsarevna Irina	22 April 1627	8 April 1679
Tsarevna Pelagia	17 August 1628	25 January 1629
Tsar Alexei I	19 March 1629	29 January 1676
Tsarevna Anna	14 July 1630	27 October 1692
Tsarevna Martha	19 August 1631	21 September 1632
Tsarevich Ivan	2 June 1633	10 January 1639
Tsarevna Sophia	30 September 1634	23 June 1636
Tsarevna Tatiana	5 January 1636	24 August 1706
Tsarevna Eudoxia	10 February 1637	10 February 1637
Tsarevich Vasili	14 March 1639	25 March 1639

== See also ==
- Rulers of Russia family tree

Regnal titles
Preceded by Vladislav I	Tsar of Russia; 1613–1645	Succeeded by Alexis
