= Foy de la Neuville =

Foy de la Neuville is the mysterious author of Relation curieuse de la Moscovie, a late seventeen-hundreds account of a foreign traveler's trek to Russia. Almost nothing is known about this author, not even his real name. His reasons for traveling to Muscovy are also not known with certainty. It is speculated that he may have been a Polish diplomat assigned to Russia.

Relation curieuse de la Moscovie describes de la Neuville's visit to Russia in the Winter months of 1689. The writing shows that he clearly had access to the Russian government and its officials at high levels. It has been at times suggested that he never actually visited Russia, and that his book is simply a compilation of what other's before him had written. While it is probable that much of the stories he recalls from his travels are simply made up, it is clear that even more are not. His travels to Russia in service of the king of Poland are well documented.

De la Neuville has also been (falsely) identified as a pen name for another writer, Adrien Baillet.
