= Terem (Russia) =

Separate living quarters for women in Muscovite Russia

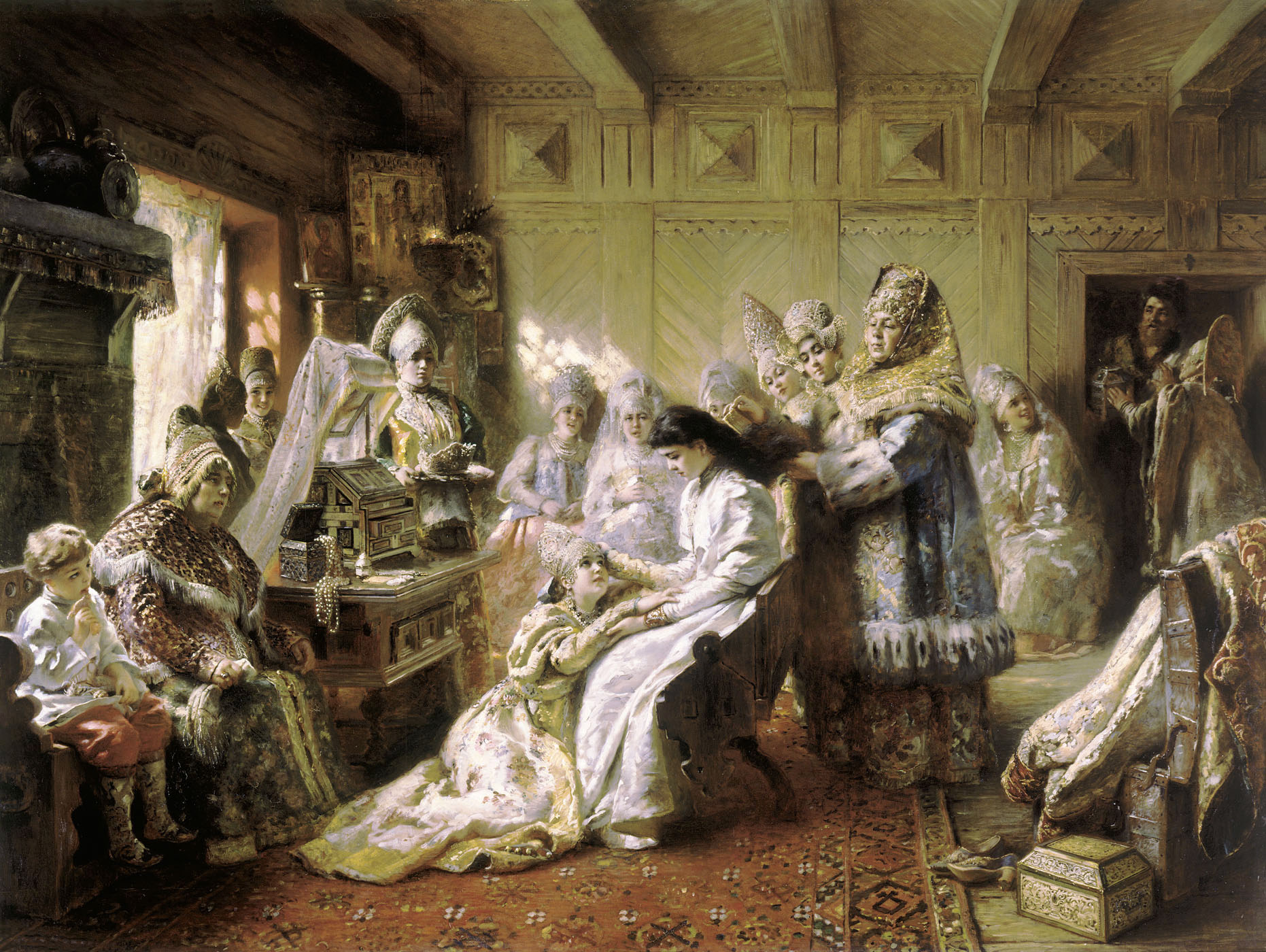
Preparation for the wedding in the terem, painting by Konstantin Makovsky, 1890

The terem (Russian: терем) was separate living quarters occupied by elite women in Muscovite Russia. In a narrow context, it may refer to the upper story of a home or castle, often with a pitched roof. In a broader context, the term is used by historians to discuss the elite social practice of female seclusion that reached its height in the 17th century. Royal or noble women were not only confined to separate quarters, but were also prevented from socialization with men outside their immediate family, and were shielded from the public eye in closed carriages or heavily concealing clothing.

The word is not to be confused with the Terem Palace in Moscow, an extended part of the Grand Kremlin Palace, which was not occupied exclusively by women.

== Etymology ==
Although the origins of the practice are still a matter of debate among historians, it is generally believed that the word terem comes from the Proto-Slavic root *term ('dwelling'). Its usage in a Russian context has been dated to the times of Kievan Rus'. Although a matriarchy may have ruled over several East Slavic tribes prior to the Kievan period, the introduction of Christianity in the late 10th century brought a patriarchal system. However, the process of conversion took several centuries. and the Church was forced to assimilate various pagan beliefs into its own structure. By the 14th and 15th centuries, during the Mongol domination of Russia, Christianity had permeated all levels of Russian society, and women were increasingly subordinated to men. During the Muscovite period, with growing centralization, the hierarchy of social relations became much more clearly defined.

The word terem is in no way linguistically related to the Arabic word harem, as was mistakenly assumed by foreign travelers to Russia during the period, as well as 19th-century Russian historians who thought it to be directly derived from the Islamic practice of enclosing the female members of a household. Parallels have been drawn between the terem and the South Asian practice of female physical seclusion, purdah, but this is also problematic due to a lack of evidence suggesting that the terem was derived from foreign cultural practices. Contemporary Russian sources often use the word pokoi ('calm, rest'), but 19th-century historians popularized the word terem, which became synonymous with the general practice of elite female seclusion.

== Practice ==
=== As women's quarters ===
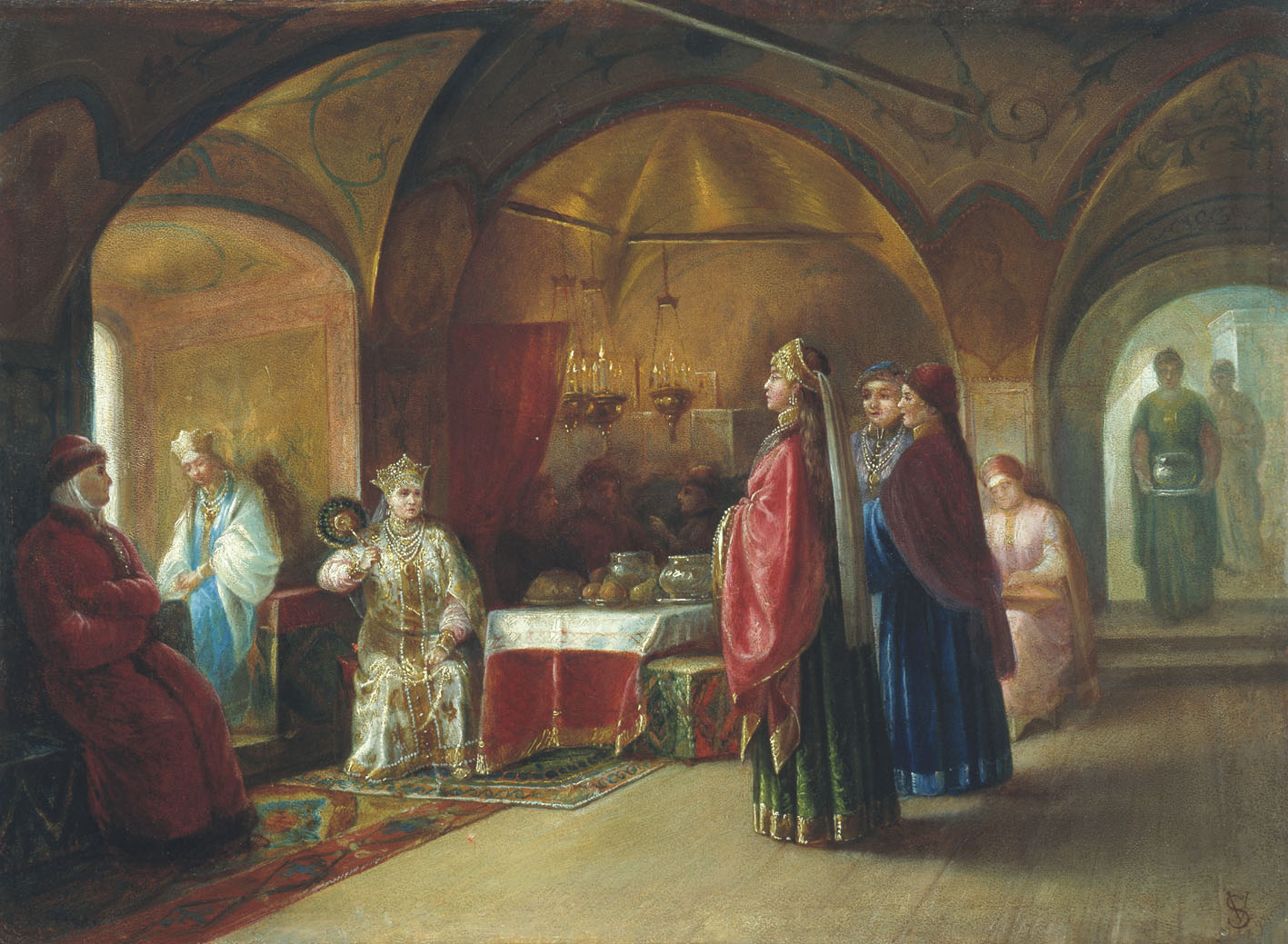
The terem of tsarevnas, painting by Mikhail Petrovich Klodt, 1878

In the 16th and 17th centuries, the seclusion of aristocratic women in separate quarters became a common practice among royal and boyar families. The terem was often a cloistered apartment within a home or castle, usually on an upper story or in a separate wing, from which all contact with unrelated males was forbidden. As a separate building, the women's quarters might only be connected to the men's by an outdoor passageway. The women's quarters of the tsar's palace were particularly elaborate and were equipped with a separate courtyard, dining room, and children’s apartments, as well as a large group of maidservants, wet nurses, nannies, and ladies in waiting. Even in the late 17th century, when different rooms began to be distinguished for specific purposes, separate quarters for men and women were maintained in noble households.

Daughters were often born and brought up solely within the confines of the terem, where they were isolated in accordance with Eastern Orthodox teachings regarding premarital virginity. They were taught by their mothers and other female relatives to become wives, spending most of their days in prayer or needlework. Indeed, except for short excursions, women did not leave their quarters until marriage, though they were permitted to receive visitors and leave their rooms to manage household affairs. Male children, on the other hand, were typically taken from their mother’s care around the age of seven to receive formal instruction at the hands of private tutors or their male family members.

=== As a political and social institution ===
The practice of the terem strictly segregated aristocratic Russian women both from members of the opposite sex as well as the public eye in general. Under the institution of the terem, aristocratic men and women were assigned to wholly separate spheres. Elite women were completely subordinate to their husbands and could not hold public office or power. Even tsaritsas were not crowned alongside their husbands, the first female co-ruler being Catherine I in 1724. However, in some ways, the women did have an advantage over their Western counterparts in that they could hold property and manage their own dowries. Most importantly, though, mothers were given great authority in arranging marriages, which often had invaluable political and economic implications. Traditionally, they held immense influence over marriage selections for their children, both male and female, and even interviewed prospective candidates. For example, the Romanovs' ascension to power in 1613 was dependent on a marriage alliance formed between Anastasia Romanovna and Ivan IV in 1547, an alliance overseen by the mothers of both parties. Most of the petitions received by the tsaritsa were, in fact, requests for permission to marry. In this way, women were able to express some degree of political sway, a fact that has led some recent historians such as Isolde Thyret to question the degree to which women were politically repressed by the institution of the terem. These issues aside, the fact that the institution placed extreme restrictions on female mobility remains unquestionable.

The primary function of the terem was political, as it was intended to protect a woman's value in the marriage market. As in Islamic and Near Eastern societies, the veiling and seclusion of women allowed for greater control over a woman’s marriage choices, which often had immense political and economic implications. The seclusion of women and the practice of arranged marriage were fairly common in medieval and early modern European history, though Russian women were restricted to a greater degree. Though Orthodox belief emphasized the importance of virginity, to a greater degree was virginity valued as a measure of a woman's worth when establishing political and economic alliances through marriage. Mothers had a traditional role in negotiating these arranged marriages, one of the few ways in which female political power could be manifested under the institution of the terem. Orthodox beliefs regarding menstruation may have also been used to justify the seclusion of women. Ecclesiastical regulations forbade menstruating women from entering in church buildings and participating in other activities, further justifying the segregation of women who were "ritually unclean".

The extent to which female mobility was restricted by the terem as an institution governing female behavior is evident in several different sources. In the 16th-century travel writings of German diplomat Sigismund von Herberstein, which provides the first record of female seclusion in Russia, it is noted that:

No woman who walks in the street is deemed chaste or respectable. Thus wealthy or important people keep their women so shut up that no one can see or speak to them; they entrust them with nothing beyond sewing and spinning. The women conduct their domestic affairs by themselves with male servants…The women are rarely allowed to go to church, and much less often to visit friends, unless they have grown so old as to be beyond attention and suspicion.

A century later, German scholar Adam Olearius also observed the extent to which female movement was regulated:

After the wedding, the women are secluded in their chambers and rarely appear in company. They are more often visited by their friends than permitted to visit them...because they are mistrusted, they are rarely allowed out of the house, even to go to church.

This extended to seclusion from social and political affairs within the royal court. As noted by historian Brenda Meehan-Waters, "propriety demanded that 'if a Russian gives an Entertainment to Persons not related to him, the Mistress of the House does not appear at all or only just before Dinner, to make the Guests welcome with a Kiss and a Cup of Brandy, after which she makes her Poclan or Courtesy, and gets out of the Way again.'" The institution of the terem was even reflected in diplomatic practice, particularly in forging marriage alliances. Strict separation was maintained even between the betrothed. For example, during the marriage of Ivan III's daughter Helena Ivanovna to Alexander, the grand duke of Lithuania, it was insisted upon that Helena use her own carriage and even stand on a separate carpet when meeting with her future husband.

The terem as a social ideal was also exhibited in women's dress of the 16th and 17th centuries. Women traditionally wore heavily concealing clothing with high necks and long sleeves. They were often multi-layered and loose-fitting. Married women of all statuses were expected to cover their heads with a headdress like a kokoshnik, and shrouding or veiling was common. The terem also held a certain amount of social value. Seclusion was considered a mark of honor among aristocratic women, and a privilege out of the reach of the lower classes. Inside the terem walls, women were safe from attack and insult, as well as contact with people who might "besmirch their character".

This was a socially narrow practice, meaning that strict segregation of women was only practiced on the daughters and wives of wealthy boyars and the royal family. Women from the provincial gentry, merchant, and peasant classes did not have the "economic means, nor the political incentive" to practice female seclusion, and often had to bear the same economic responsibilities as men. In this respect, peasant and town women were afforded greater freedom of movement. As Adam Olearius observed, speaking of the strict segregation of aristocratic women, "These customs, however, are not strictly observed among the common people. At home the women go poorly attired except when they appear, at the order of their husbands, to render honor to a strange guest by sipping a cup of vodka to him, or when they go through the streets, to church, for example; then they are supposed to be dressed gorgeously, with their faces and throats heavily made up."

However, as seclusion was perceived as a mark of honor, all women "mimicked the goals of seclusion by modest dress and public behavior, and by supporting a highly articulated system of honor" deeply influenced by Orthodox teaching.

=== In folklore ===
The motif of the terem was frequently alluded to in folklore. One story immortalizes the lonely daughter of the tsar who “sits behind three-times-nine locks; she sits behind three-times-nine keys; where the wind never blew, the sun never shone, and young heroes never saw her.” In popular songs, too, many allusions are made to the mysterious and symbolic seclusion of women. One wedding song references the symbolic emergence of the virtuous maiden from the seclusion of the terem, emphasizing the untouchable nature of the female sphere:

So from the terem, the terem,

From the fair, the lofty terem, The fair, the lofty, the bright, From under her mother’s care, Has come forth the fair maiden, Has come forth, has hastened out,

The sweet fair maiden, Avdotyushka.

== Origins and historiography ==
The origins of the terem are still a matter of historical debate among scholars. Unfortunately, due to a paucity of sources from the late Muscovite and early modern Russian period, it is particularly difficult for historians to either determine the cultural origins of the practice of segregating elite women, or when it became a part of the social mainstream.

=== Chronological origins ===
Historians of the nineteenth and early twentieth centuries theorized that the terem was adopted from practices of the Mongol Empire during the occupation of the Golden Horde, in the 13th century.

The earliest source which references the terem does not appear until the 16th century, but it is uncertain how long it had been in practice prior to the writing of Sigismund von Herberstein's 1557 account of Russia. With Herberstein's account, historians "postulate a radical change in women’s status during the time of Ivan III," though it is unlikely that such a dramatic social change was undertaken so suddenly.

This evidence has led several modern historians, including Nancy S. Kollman, to point to the end of the 15th century for the origins of female seclusion in Russia. This is further corroborated by the fact that the grand princesses of the 15th century, Sofiia Vitovtovna and Sofiia Palaiologina both received foreign envoys in 1476 and 1490, respectively. An elite society governed by strict segregation of the sexes, like that of the later period, would not have permitted women such participation in political affairs. According to Natalia Pushkareva, women earlier in the Muscovite period "had actively involved themselves in governmental affairs, had received ambassadors, led diplomatic missions, disseminated learning, and worked as physicians." Indeed, royal women in the following century clearly lacked the level of political participation enjoyed by their 15th-century counterparts. As Kollmann points out, women are discussed in much the same way throughout the period from the 14th to the 17th centuries, suggesting that the terem was a gradual adoption over time, but that the position of elite women was limited throughout the Muscovite period. Other modern historians favor the view that the terem was a relatively recent innovation, some even going so far as to call it “short-lived” and hardly predating the Time of Troubles.

=== Cultural origins ===
The other historiographic issue which dominates discussion on the terem is whether the practice itself was adopted externally from another culture or was unique to Muscovite society. Historians previously thought that the terem was a practice of female seclusion borrowed from Mongol overlordship around the thirteenth century. However, this view is now outdated and generally discredited for assuming “Orientalizing” stereotypes of Russian culture common in popular literature of the time. Russian historian Vissarion Belinsky, writing on the reforms of Peter the Great, associated the terem and other "backward" institutions like "burying money in the ground and of wearing rags for fear of revealing one's wealth" as being the fault of Tatar influence. This tendency to associate repressive cultural practices with Mongol influence, claims Charles J. Halperin, constitutes an attempt to explain away “Russia's failings” by placing the blame on Mongol occupiers. Other claims that linked the terem to the Islamic harem or the South Asian purdah are faulty, if not completely unsubstantiated.

The suggestion that the Muscovites borrowed female seclusion from the Mongols is impossible, as pointed out by Halperin, because the Mongols never practiced female seclusion, a view upheld by Kollmann and Ostrowski as well. In fact, women of the Chingisid dynasty and the wives and widows of the khan enjoyed relatively higher political power and social freedom. An alternative theory proposes that the practice was taken from the Byzantine Empire. Though Byzantine women were not secluded after the 11th century, it remained a highly praised ideal that could have easily been adopted by visiting Muscovite churchmen, already deeply influenced by Orthodox teachings on gender and female roles.

Although the exact origins of the practice remain a mystery, most historians now concede that the terem was actually an indigenous innovation, most likely developed in response to political changes that occurred during the 16th century.

=== Problems with foreign sources ===
Because many of the sources that describe the terem were written by foreign travelers, many scholars are skeptical of their validity and the degree to which they merely perpetuated European stereotypes of Russian "backwardness". For example, historian Nada Boskovska argues that the Russian, Grigory Kotoshikhin, who wrote a 17th-century account of Russia during the reign of Aleksei Mikhailovich for the king of Sweden, may have been merely fulfilling European stereotypes of Russian “orientalism” when he described women as being secluded to "secret chambers" (tainye pokoi). Similar charges have been levied against the 16th-century travel accounts of Olearius and Von Herberstein. However, as most of the only surviving sources that describe the practice of the terem were written by foreign travelers, it is difficult to completely dismiss the evidence which they present.

== History and evolution ==
=== 16th and 17th centuries ===
The first accounts by foreign travelers like Adam Olearius and Sigismund von Herberstein that described the institution of the terem first appeared in the 16th century. Though a lack of source evidence makes comparison with previous centuries difficult, historians generally agree that the practice of terem reached its height during the 17th century, during the early Romanov dynasty. During this time, the political importance of upper-class women, even those who were members of the tsar's family, clearly began to decline, as power became increasingly centralized in the person of the autocrat. Multiple accounts by foreign travelers described women as being in nearly constant seclusion and women and children in procession were observed as shrouded. The Russian government also became more formalized and bureaucratic. As a result, traditional offices typically afforded to women of the imperial family, such as the reading of petitions by the tsaritsa, were transferred to officials of the court instead.

At least for the family of the tsar, however, the terem was relatively short-lived and restrictions imposed on female members of the royal family were relaxed towards the end of the century. Strict rules governing female appearance in public were somewhat relaxed after the marriage of Tsar Aleksei to Natalia Naryshkina in 1671. Natalia, his second wife, was quick to abandon the practice of riding in a closed carriage, sparking public scandal. When Aleksei died, he left six daughters by his first marriage, most of whom began to appear in public and dress in a more European fashion. The regent Sophia (1682-1689), although greatly limited in her power, was also able to participate in activities of state and received foreign ambassadors. However, she too spent much of her time in her quarters and later, banishment in a convent. Still, by the end of the 1670s and 1680s, women began to appear unveiled in public and women began to play a greater role in the social functions of state.

=== Reign of Peter the Great and abolition of the terem ===
In 1718, Peter the Great (r. 1682–1725) officially outlawed the seclusion of aristocratic women in the terem and ordered that they participate in the social functioning of the new, Western-style court at St. Petersburg. During this period, Peter sought to transform the nobility from a hereditary class to one whose status was dependent on service to the state. Thus, targeting familial norms was only one part of his ongoing agenda to destroy the "clan politics" of his realm and to "create a service nobility modeled on that of the West".

However, the forced introduction of women into the social organism of the court was met with resistance on certain fronts. Certainly, not all women were happy to attend the assemblies of court organized by Peter and adopt new clothing styles radically different from traditionally concealing garments. Traditionally, women were draped in heavily concealing clothing and were often veiled, but at the behest of Peter, royal women began to adopt clothing that closely mimicked revealing, Western-style gowns and corsets. Evidence also suggests that for many years the presence of noblewomen at court functions was only practiced in St. Petersburg. The practice was slow to die in many parts because, in the eyes of the conservative, the honor and reputation of wives and daughters were at stake. As late as 1713, foreign travelers observed that aristocratic Russian women were still kept "extremely retired".

On the whole, however, the abolition of the terem greatly improved the legal and social status of noblewomen in Russia. The decision followed on the heels of Peter's 1714 decree which abolished the distinction between military land grants and hereditary estates, giving women the ability to inherit all her husband's lands. Socialization and new forms of leisure and luxury obliterated the terem and female seclusion as an institution. Women, by law, were now allowed to have a say in the choice of their marriage partners and the education of elite women was made a priority, later carried out by Catherine the Great.

== Bibliography ==
- "Терем" . Brockhaus and Efron Encyclopedic Dictionary (in Russian). 1906.
- Halperin, Charles J. (1985). Russia and the Golden Horde: The Mongol Impact on Medieval Russian History. Bloomington, IN: Indiana University Press. p. 116. ISBN 978-0-253-35033-6.
  - Halperin, Charles J. (1987). Russia and the Golden Horde: The Mongol Impact on Medieval Russian History. p. 222. ISBN 9781850430575. (e-book).
