= Xenia Shestova =

Russian noblewoman (1560–1631)

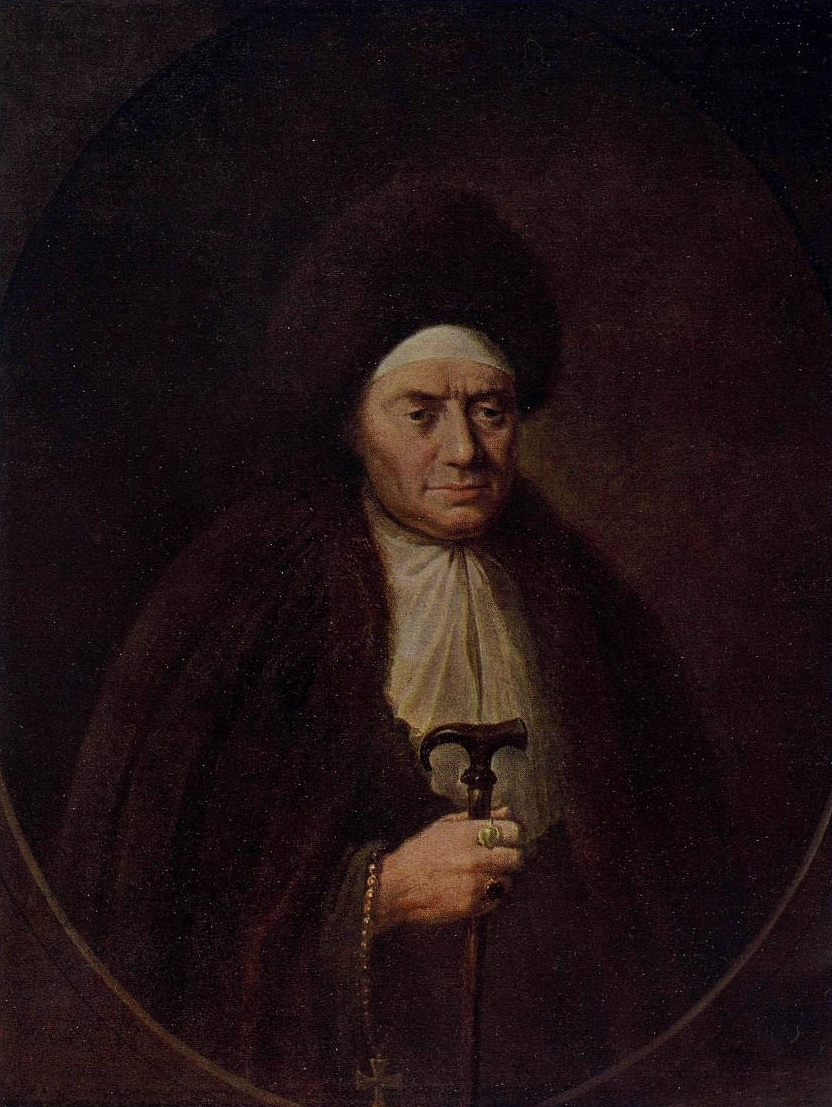
- Born: 1560
- Died: January 27, 1631 (aged 70–71)
- Buried: Novospassky Monastery
- Noble family: Romanov
- Spouse: Fyodor Romanov
- Issue: Michael of Russia
- Father: Ivan Vasiljevich Shestov
- Mother: Maria Timofeyevna Shestova

Xenia Ivanovna Shestova (Russian: Ксения Ивановна Шестова (or Романова); 1560–1631) was the wife of boyar Fyodor Romanov and the mother of Tsar Michael of Russia.

== Life ==
The origins of Xenia Ivanovna Shestova have been disputed by genealogists for centuries. It is currently accepted that her surname was Shestova (Шестова; rather than Shastunova, as was previously thought) and that her maternal grandfather was Timofey Gryaznoy, a rich landowner from Uglich.

During Boris Godunov's repression of the Romanovs, she was forced to take the veil, changing her name to Martha (Russian: Марфа). After several years of exile at Tolvuyskiy pogost, she settled with her son in Kostroma. It was there that the ambassadors arrived to inform Mikhail about his election to the Russian throne in 1613. As the previous tsars had been either killed or disgraced, Martha at first declined to bless her son and let him go to Moscow.

During the first years of his reign, Martha (or the "great nun" as she came to be known) exerted her influence on her young and collaboration-minded son. She spoke ill of Michael’s three choices of wives. Unbidden, she assumed education of her grandchildren. Xenia placed her relatives at important posts in the government, leading to widespread corruption. Her husband's return from Poland in 1619 put an end to their, and her own, influence in court. She died on 27 January 1631 and was buried in the Novospassky Monastery.
