= Patriarch Filaret of Moscow =

Russian boyar

Filaret
- Patriarch of Moscow and all Russia
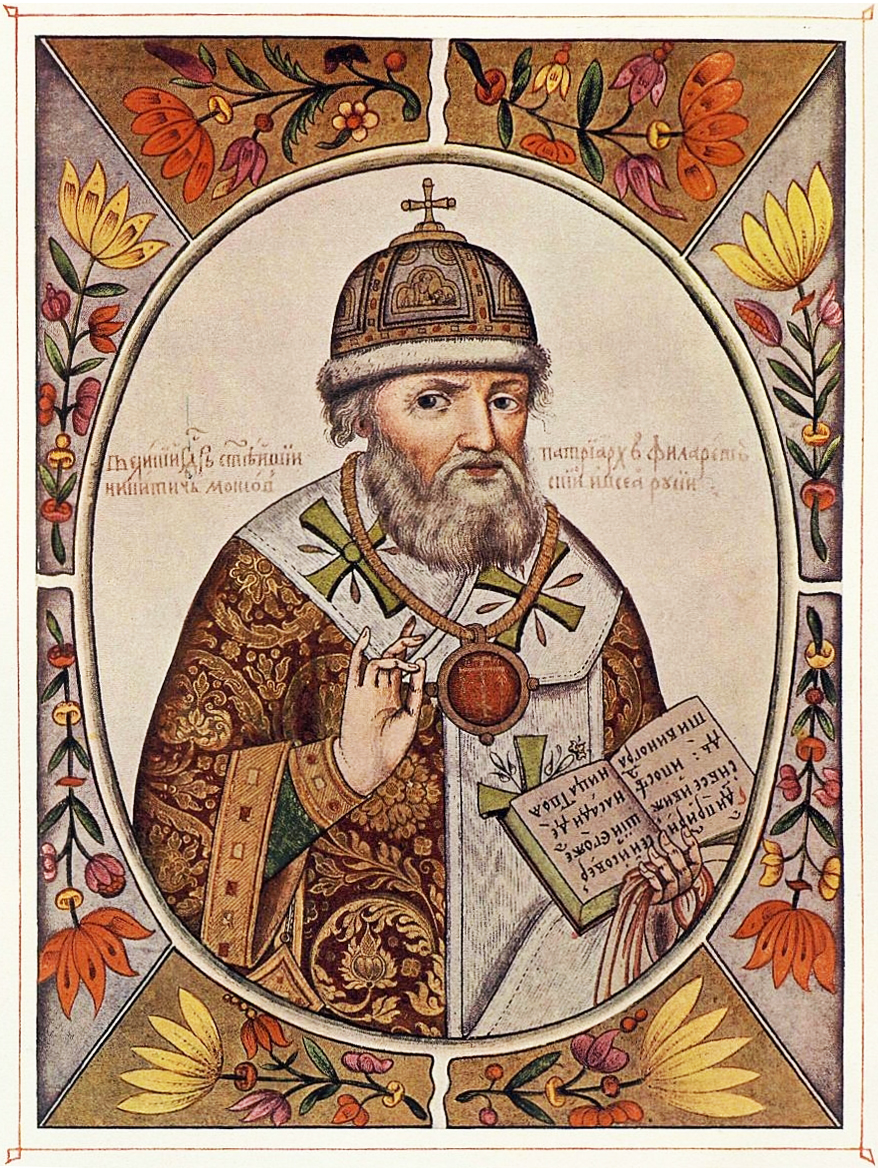
- Portrait in the Tsarsky titulyarnik, 1672
- Church: Russian Orthodox Church
- See: Moscow
- Installed: 1619
- Term ended: 1633
- Predecessor: Hermogenes
- Successor: Joasaphus I

Personal details
- Born: Fyodor Nikitich Romanov c. 1553 Moscow, Russia
- Died: 1 October 1633 (aged 79–80) Moscow, Russia
- Buried: Dormition Cathedral, Moscow
- Denomination: Orthodox Christianity
- Parents: Nikita Romanovich; Princess Evdokiya Alexandrovna Gorbataya-Shuyskaya
- Spouse: Xenia Shestova
- Children: Mikhail Fyodorovich Romanov; 5 others

Feodor Nikitich Romanov (Russian: Фео́дор Ники́тич Рома́нов, IPA: [ˈfʲɵdər nʲɪˈkʲitʲɪtɕ rɐˈmanəf]; 1553 – 1 October [O.S. 21 September] 1633) was a Russian boyar who after temporary disgrace rose to become patriarch of Moscow as Filaret (Russian: Филаре́т, IPA: [fʲɪɫɐˈrʲet]), and became de facto ruler of Russia during the reign of his son, Mikhail Feodorovich.

== Biography ==
The second son of the prominent boyar Nikita Romanovich, Feodor was born in Moscow and was the first to bear the Romanov surname. During the reign of his first cousin, Feodor I (1584–1598), Feodor distinguished himself both as a soldier and a diplomat, fighting against the forces of John III of Sweden in 1590, and conducting negotiations with the ambassadors of Rudolf II, Holy Roman Emperor from 1593 to 1594. He was made a boyar in 1583.

On the death of the childless tsar, he was the popular candidate for the vacant throne; but he acquiesced in the election of Boris Godunov, and shared the disgrace of his too-powerful family three years later, when Boris compelled both him and his wife, Xenia Shestova, to take monastic vows under the names of Filaret and Martha respectively.

Filaret was kept in the strictest confinement in the Antoniev Monastery of the Russian North, where he was exposed to every conceivable indignity; but when the False Dmitriy I overthrew the Godunovs, he released Filaret and made him metropolitan of Rostov (1605).

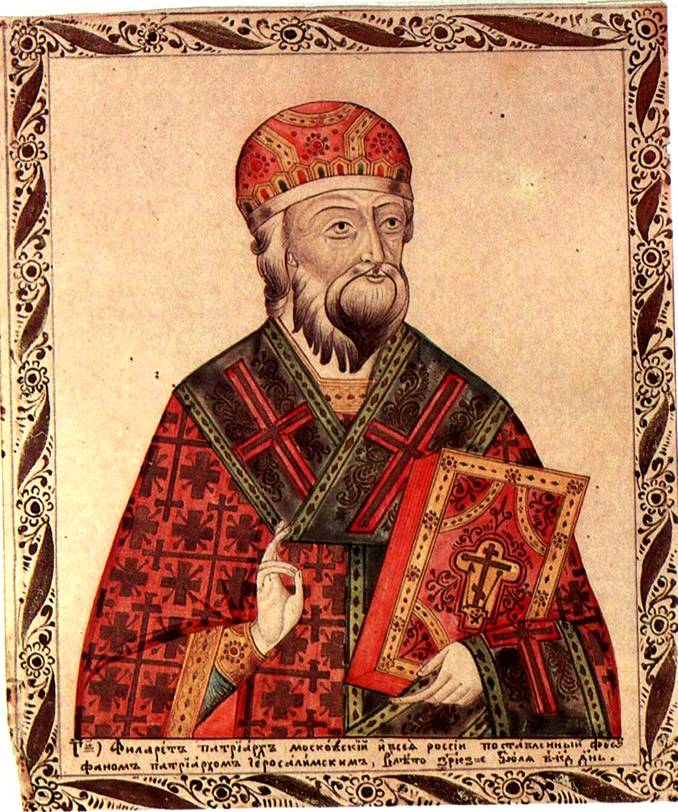
Patriarch Filaret of Moscow. A 19th-century hand-drawn lubok.

=== Patriarch of Moscow ===
In 1609 Filaret fell into the hands of False Dmitriy II, who named him Patriarch of all Russia, though his jurisdiction only extended over the very limited area which acknowledged the impostor. From 1610 to 1618 he was a prisoner in the hands of the Polish king, Sigismund III Vasa, whom he refused to acknowledge as tsar of Muscovy on being sent on an embassy to the Polish camp in 1610. He was released on the conclusion of the Truce of Deulino (13 February 1619), and on 24 June of the same year was canonically enthroned Patriarch of Moscow and all of Russia.

Thenceforth, until his death, the established government of Muscovy was a diarchy. From 1619 to 1633 there were two actual sovereigns, Tsar Michael and his father, the most holy Patriarch Filaret. Theoretically they were co-regents, but Filaret frequently transacted affairs of state without consulting the tsar. He replenished the treasury by a more equitable and rational system of assessing and collecting the taxes. His most important domestic measure was the chaining of the peasantry to the soil, a measure directed against the ever-increasing migration of the down-trodden serfs to the steppes, where they became freebooters instead of taxpayers. The taxation of the tsar's military tenants was a first step towards the proportional taxation of the hitherto privileged classes.

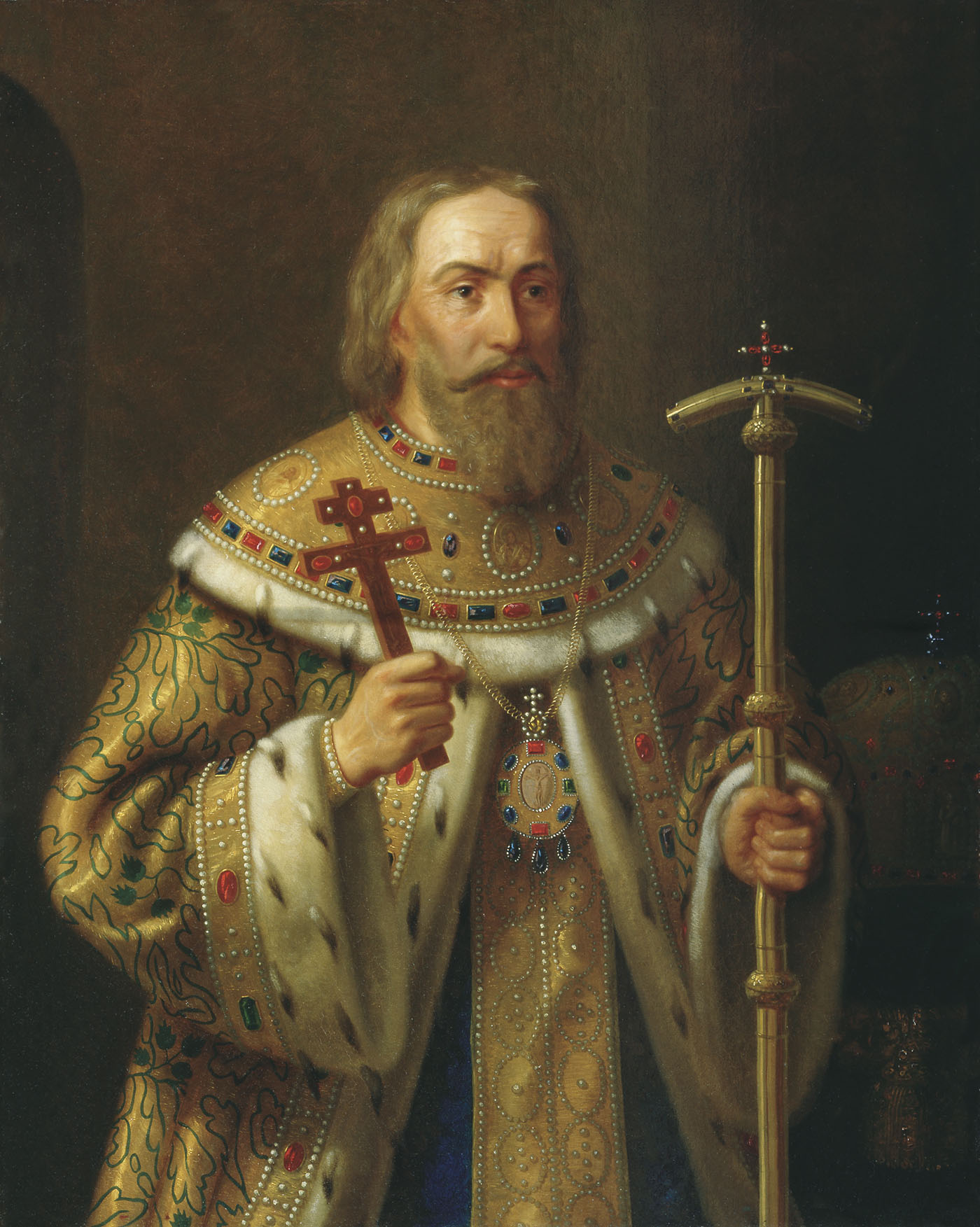
Posthumous portrait of Patriarch Filaret, before 1877

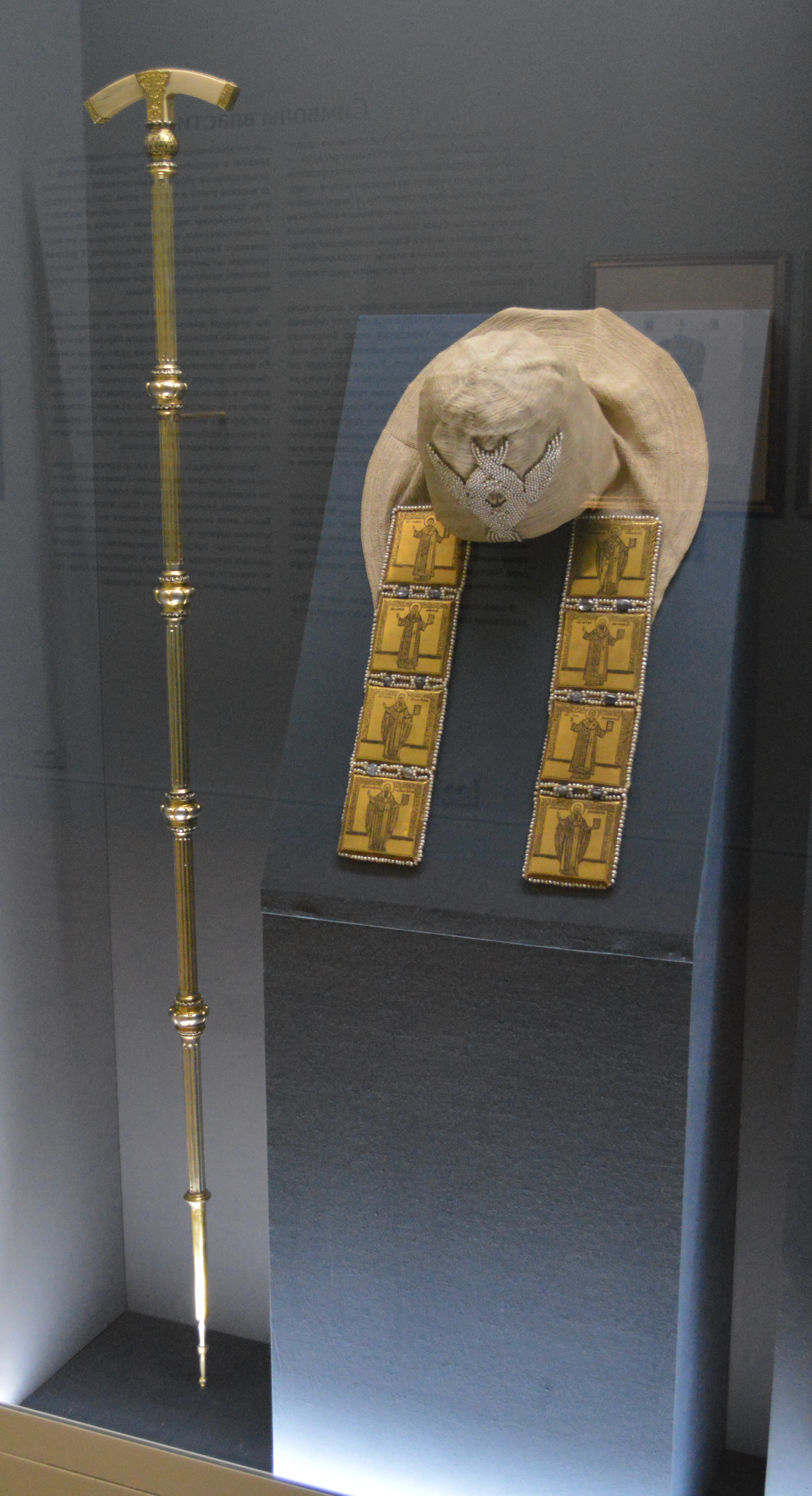
Staff and klobuk of Patriarch Filaret

Filaret's zeal for the purity of Orthodoxy sometimes led him into excesses but he encouraged the publication of theological works, formed the nucleus of the subsequently famous Patriarchal Library, and commanded that every archbishop should establish a seminary for the clergy, himself setting the example. Another great service rendered by Filaret to his country was the reorganization of the Muscovite army with the help of foreign officers. His death in October 1633 put an end to the Russo-Polish War (1632–33), withdrawing the strongest prop from a tsar feeble enough even when supported by all the weight of his authority.

Exercising the rights of a sovereign, Filaret issued a royal decree in May 1625 which gave the patriarch the right to judge and oversee the clerical and peasant populations of the patriarchate in all matters except for theft and robbery. Thus, under Filaret the patriarchate ultimately developed into a state within a state. While the administration of the patriarchate became more structured, it also became significantly more complex.

The patriarchate's administration was divided into the following departments: the Judicial (Судный) department which oversaw legal affairs; the Ecclesiastical (Церковный) department which oversaw matters regarding parishes; the Treasury (Казенный) department which oversaw tax collections from the clergy; and the Palace (Дворцовый) department which managed the economic matters on the patriarchal estates.

Each department was headed by a patriarchal boyar (a member of the highest rank of the Russian aristocracy) and staffed with clerks and scribes. The patriarch personally received and signed reports. Filaret also ordered a full inventory of church and monastery property as well as a review of the land grants issued to the monasteries.

In 1620 the new Diocese of Tobolsk was created.

In 1625 as a gift from the king of Persia, Filaret received a piece of the supposed Seamless Robe of Jesus. This relic was placed in a shrine in the Kremlin's Assumption Cathedral, and today is kept in the Cathedral of Christ the Savior in Moscow.

== Legacy ==
The patriarch was instrumental in the establishment of the Romanov dynasty through his use of ostentatious ceremonies and architectural projects which succeeded in underlining the importance of the Crown. Due to the Thirty Years War, mercenaries were common, so he hired English and Scottish officers to modernize the army, helping to push Russia into the modern age.

== Issue ==
Filaret's marriage to Xenia Shestova produced six children, of whom two survived into adulthood:

1. Tatyana (d. 1612), married Prince Ivan Mikhailovich Katyrev-Rostovsky, no issue
2. Boris (b. 1592, died in infancy)
3. Nikita (b. 1593, died in infancy)
4. Michael (1596–1645), first tsar of Russia from the House of Romanov
5. Lev (b. 1597, died in infancy)
6. Ivan (b. 1599, died in infancy)

== Sources ==
- Keep, J. L. H. "The Régime of Filaret 1619–1633". The Slavonic and East European Review 38, no. 91 (1960): 334–60. http://www.jstor.org/stable/4205172.
- Michael Karpovich. "Church and State in Russian History". The Russian Review 3, no. 2 (1944): 10–20. https://doi.org/10.2307/125405.
- Sebag Montefiore, Simon. The Romanovs: 1613 to 1918. (Penguin Random House, 2016)

Eastern Orthodox Church titles
Preceded by Germogen	Patriarch of Moscow and all Russia; 1619–1633	Succeeded by Joasaphus I
