= Dmitry Mikhailovich Golitsyn the Elder =

Russian aristocrat

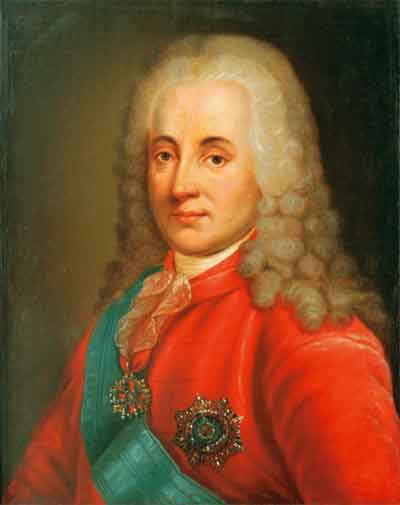
Prince Dmitry Mikhailovich Golitsyn

Prince Dmitry Mikhailovich Golitsyn (Russian: Дмитрий Михайлович Голицын, IPA: [ˈdmʲitrʲɪj mʲɪˈxajləvʲɪdʑ ɡɐˈlʲitsɨn]; 1665 – 1737) was a Russian aristocrat of the Golitsyn family. A cousin of Prince Vasily Vasilyevich Golitsyn, he was noted for his attempt to turn the Russian Empire into a constitutional monarchy.

Golitsyn was sent by Peter the Great in 1697 to Italy to learn military affairs; in 1704 he was appointed to the command of an auxiliary corps in Poland against Charles XII; from 1711 to 1718 he was governor of Belgorod. In 1718 he was appointed president of the newly erected Commerce Collegium and a senator. In May 1723 he was implicated in the disgrace of the vice-chancellor Shafirov and was deprived of all his offices and dignities, which he only recovered through the mediation of the empress.

After the death of Peter the Great, Golitsyn became the recognized head of the old Conservative party which had never forgiven Peter for divorcing Eudoxia and marrying the plebeian Martha Skavronskaya (Catherine I of Russia). But the reformers, as represented by Alexander Menshikov and Peter Tolstoi, prevailed; and Golitsyn remained in the background till the fall of Menshikov in 1727. During the last years of Peter II (1728–1730), Golitsyn was the most prominent statesman in Russia and his high aristocratic theories had full play.

On the death of Peter II he conceived the idea of limiting the autocracy by subordinating it to the authority of the Supreme privy council, of which he was president. He drew up a Conditions which Anna of Courland, the newly elected Russian empress, was forced to sign at Mittau before being permitted to proceed to Saint Petersburg. Anna lost no time in repudiating this constitution, and never forgave its authors.

Golitsyn was left in peace, however, and lived for the most part in retirement, till 1736, when he was arrested on suspicion of being concerned in the conspiracy of his son-in-law Prince Konstantin Dmitrievich Kantemir. This, however, was a mere pretext, it was for his anti-monarchical sentiments that he was really prosecuted. A court, largely composed of his antagonists, condemned him to death, but the empress reduced the sentence to lifelong imprisonment in Schlisselburg and confiscation of all his estates. He died in his prison on the 14th of April 1737, after three months of confinement.
