= Ivan Nikitin (painter) =

Russian painter (c. 1690–1741)

Ivan Nikitich Nikitin (Russian: Иван Никитич Никитин c. 1690–1741) was a Russian painter, an author of portraits and battle paintings.

== Biography ==
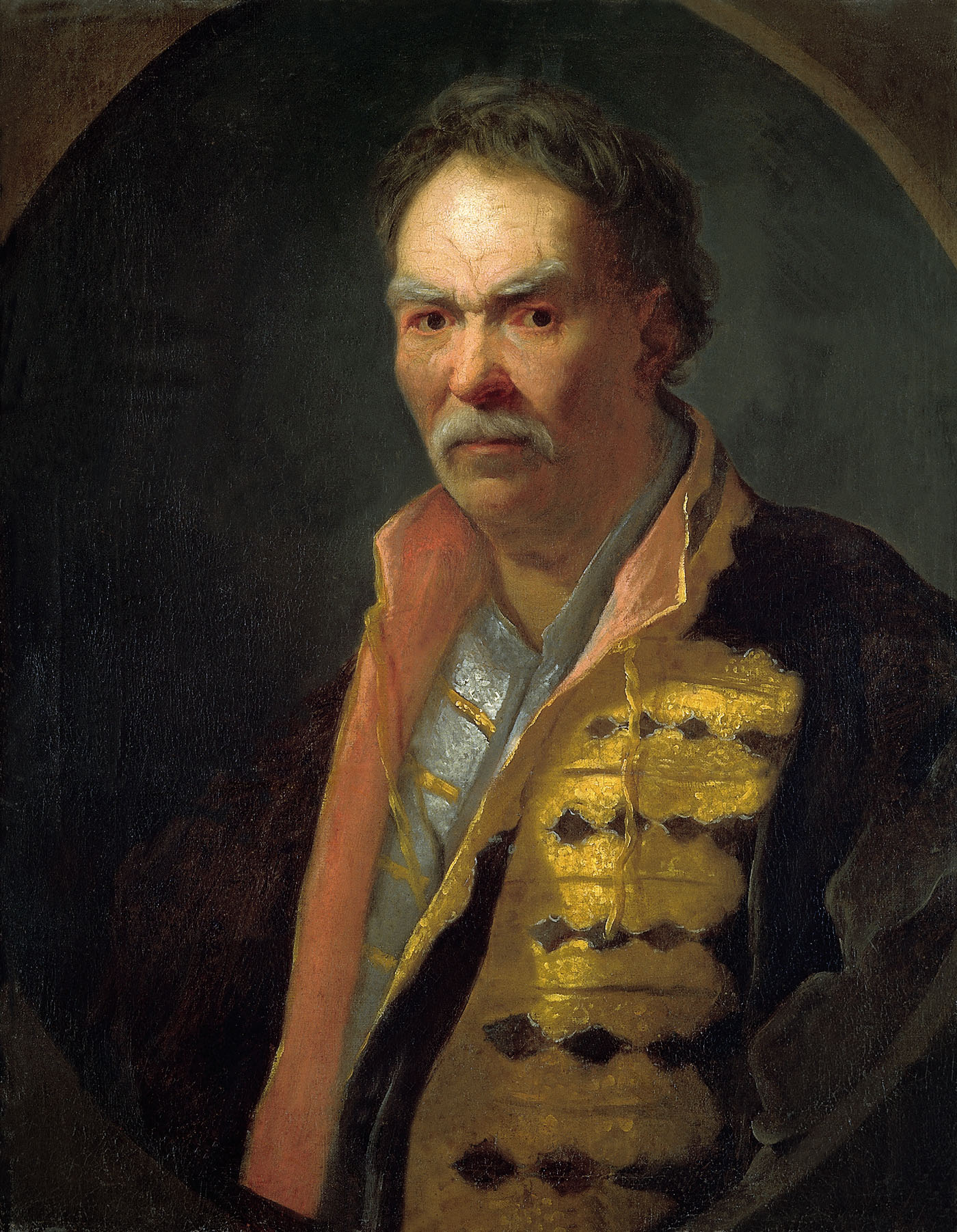
Hetman (Pavlo Polubotok?), 1720s

Ivan Nikitin was born in Moscow to a family of an Orthodox priest. He received his first artistic lessons from a Dutch artist Schwonbek at the engraving shop of the Kremlin Armoury. In 1711 the Armory together with Ivan Nikitin was moved to Saint Petersburg. In 1716–1720 he and his brother Roman Nikitin were sent to Italy by Peter the Great. The brothers learnt the art of painting at Florence and Venice. After returning to Russia Nikitin became the favorite court painter of Peter the Great. He worked in Moscow and Saint Petersburg.

After Peter's death in 1725 Nikitin continued to work at the court until 1732, when he and his brothers Roman and Rodion (the dean of the Cathedral of the Annunciation in Moscow Kremlin) were arrested for the distribution of pamphlets against vice-Procurator of Synod Feofan Prokopovich. Ivan was tortured, for five years imprisoned in the Peter and Paul Fortress, then whipped and exiled to Tobolsk.

In 1740 Anna of Russia signed an amnesty for the brothers. The amnesty came into force in 1741. By request of the new Empress Elizabeth of Russia, Nikitin travelled back from Tobolsk to Saint Petersburg and died somewhere on the road either in late 1741 or in early 1742.

== Works ==
The early portraits by Nikitin had a strong influence of the traditional 17th century parsuna style: no perspective, rigid local colors, dark backgrounds. The later portraits are typical Baroque paintings. Most art historians consider the Nikitin's best portraits to be Chancellor G. I. Golovkin and A Malorossian Hetman. There are problems attributing the subject of the portrait, with different historians arguing that he is Ivan Mazepa or Ivan Skoropadsky or Kazimir Ian Sapega, or Pavlo Polubotok, but they all are equal in emphasising the psychological depth of the portrait.

Besides portraits, Ivan Nikitin is also considered to be the first notable Russian battle painter due to his paintings of the Battle of Poltava and Battle of Kulikovo.

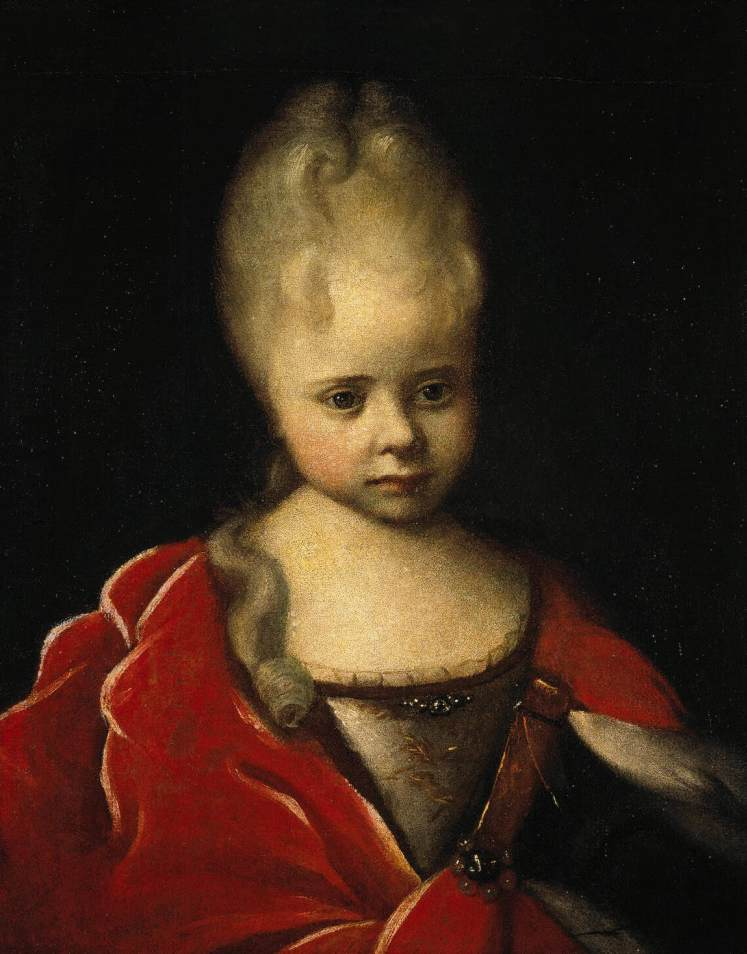
Princess Elizabeth, 1712–1713

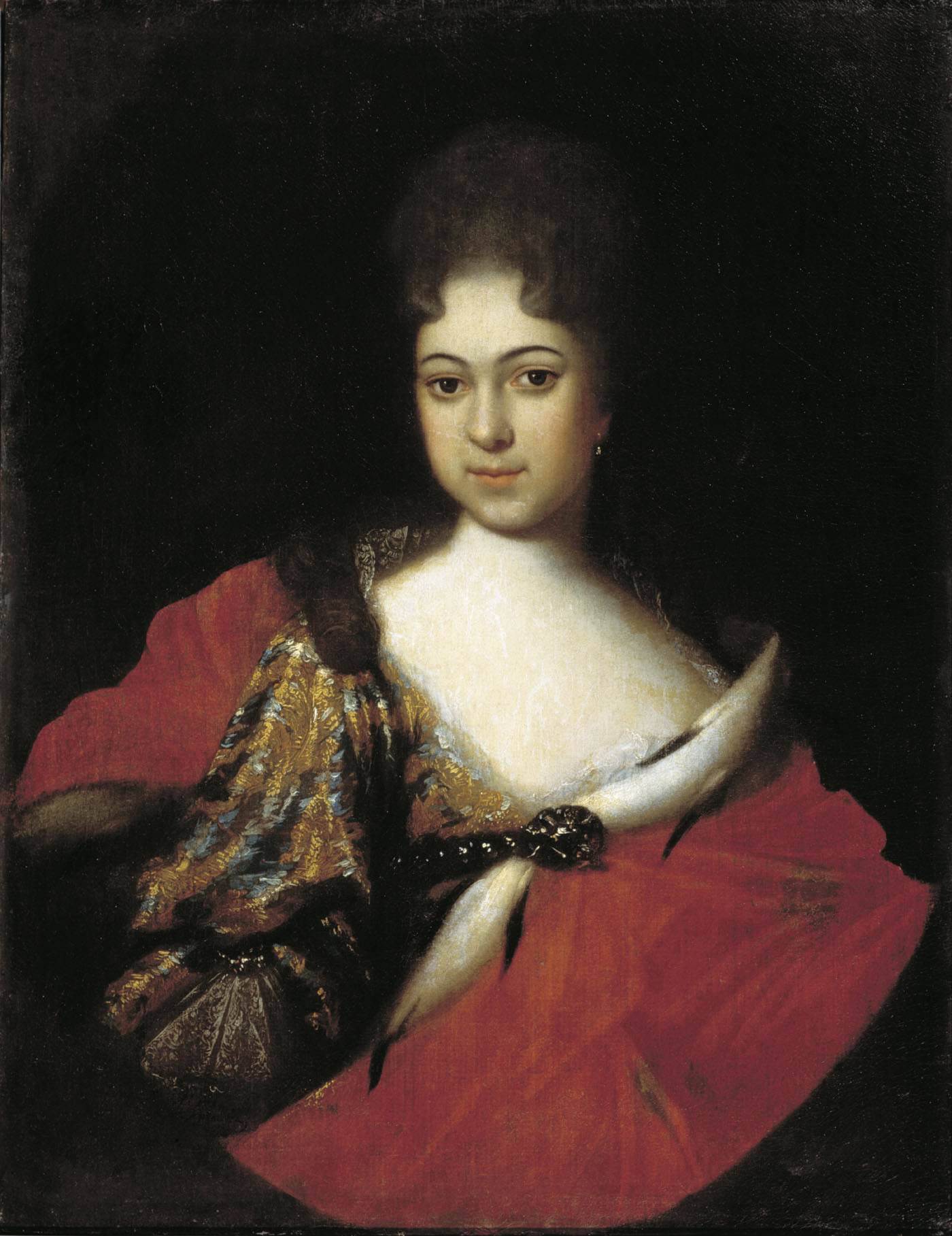
Tsarevna Praskovya Ivanovna, 1714

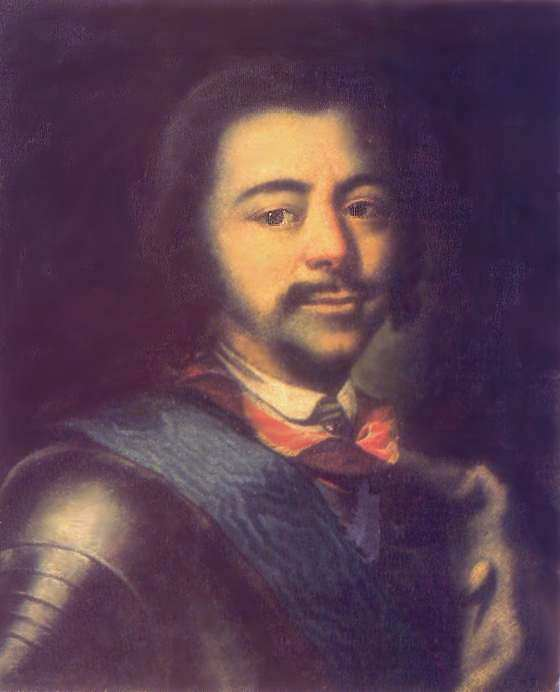
Peter the Great, 1715–1716

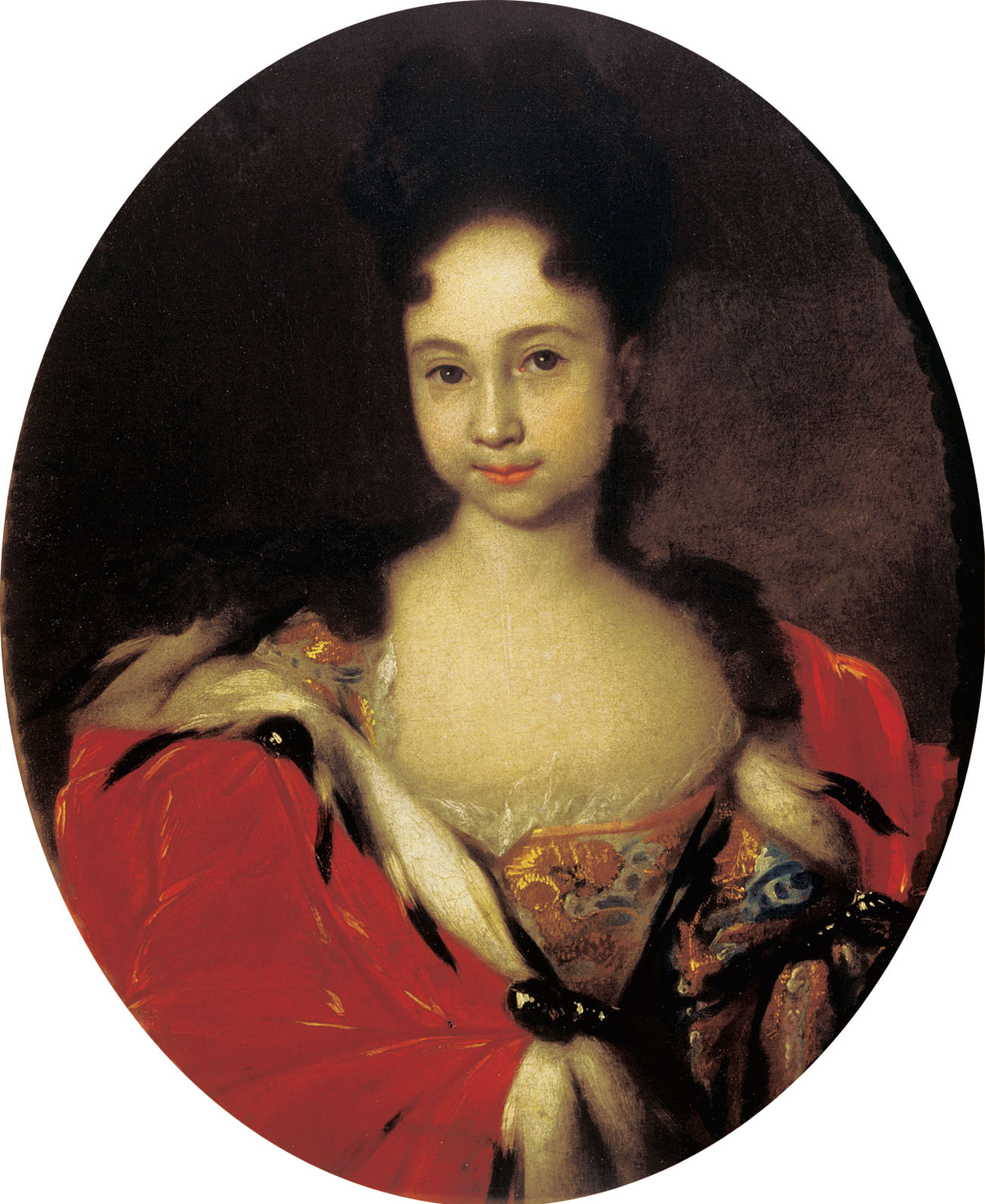
Grand Duchess Anna Petrovna, before 1716

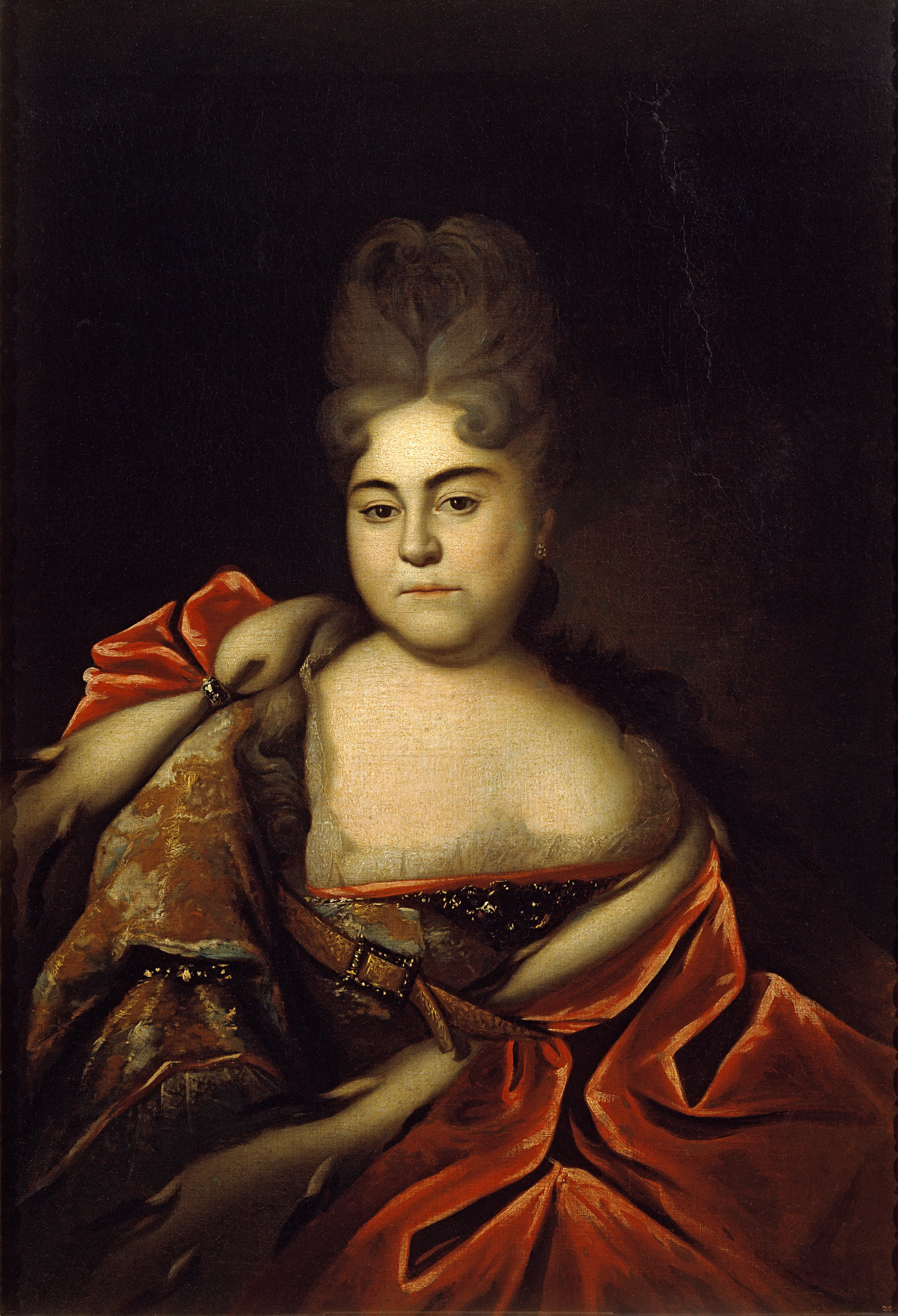
Tsarevna Natalya Alexeyevna 1716

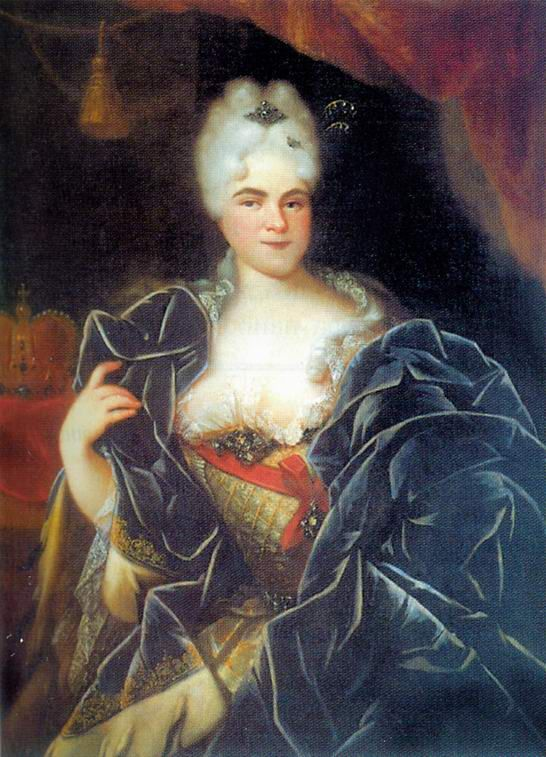
Catherine I of Russia, 1717

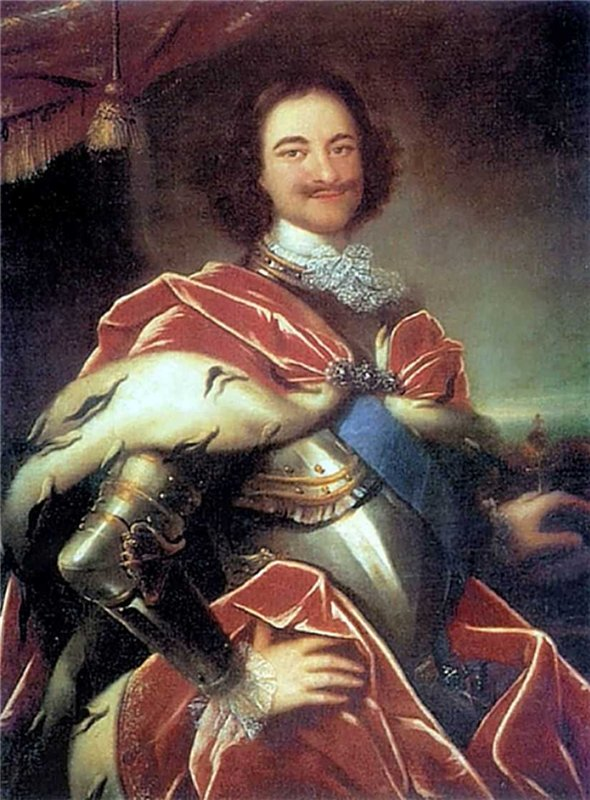
Peter the Great, 1717

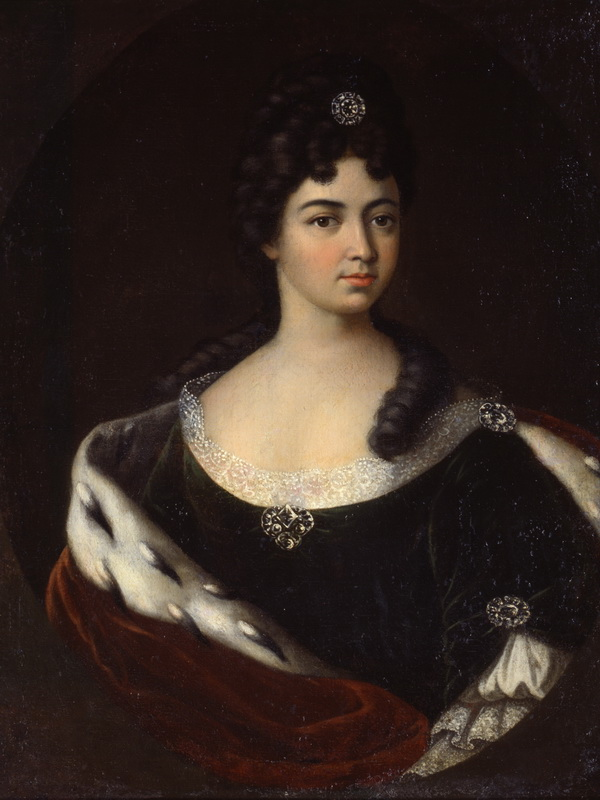
Maria Cantemir

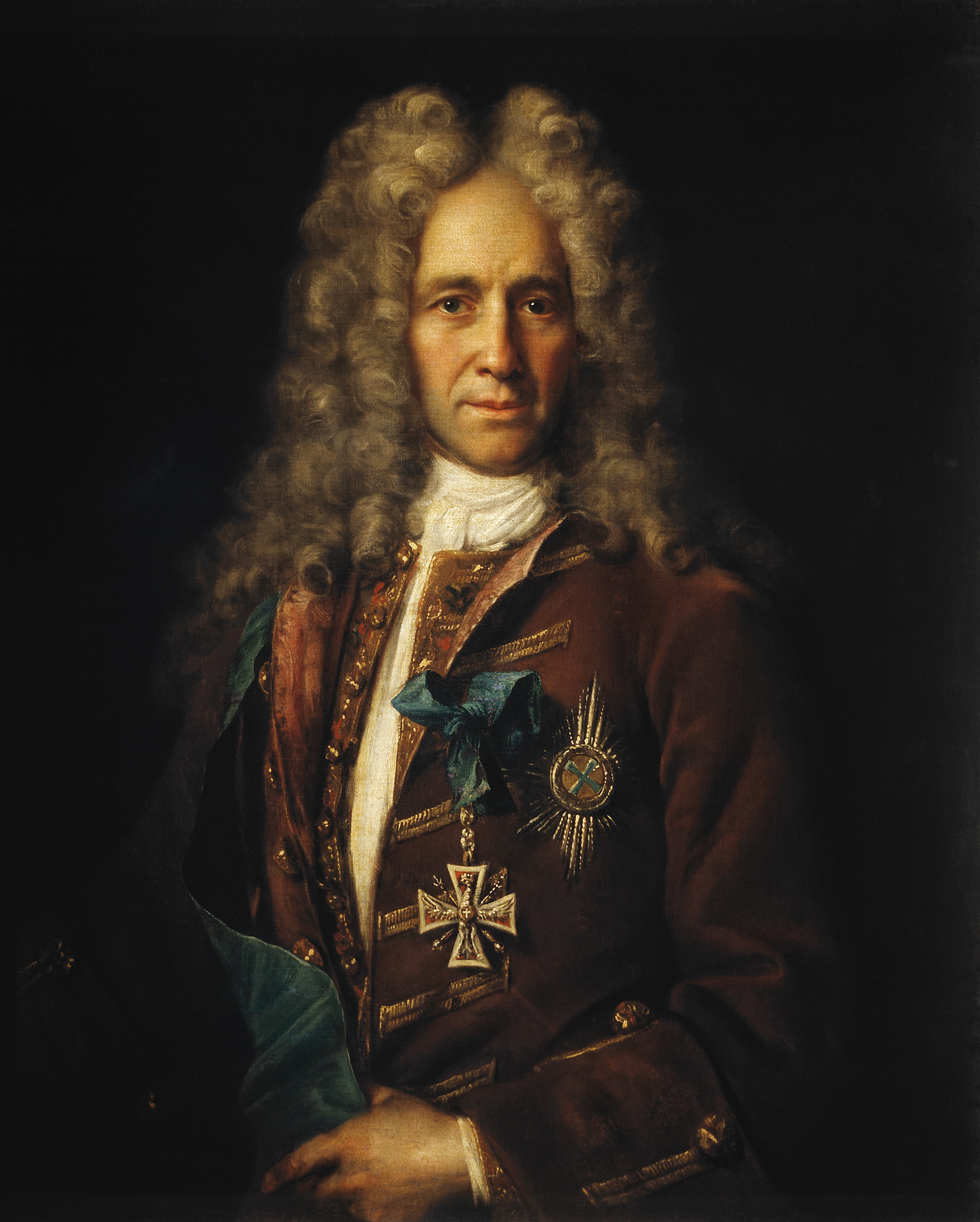
Chancellor G. I. Golovkin 1720s

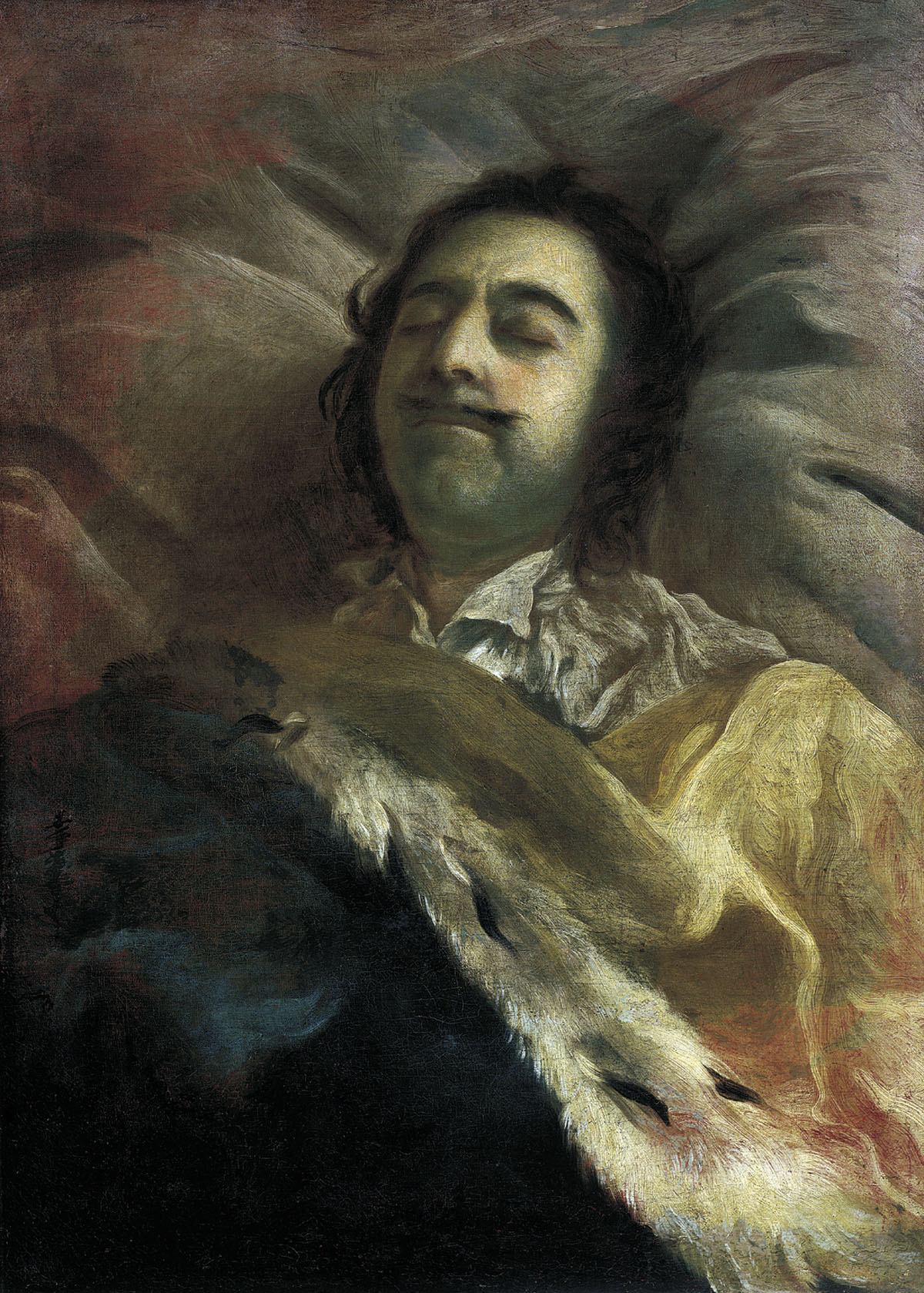
Peter the Great on the deathbed 1725

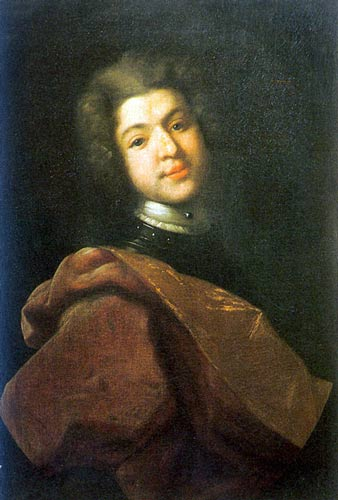
Baron Sergei Grigoriyevich Stroganov 1726

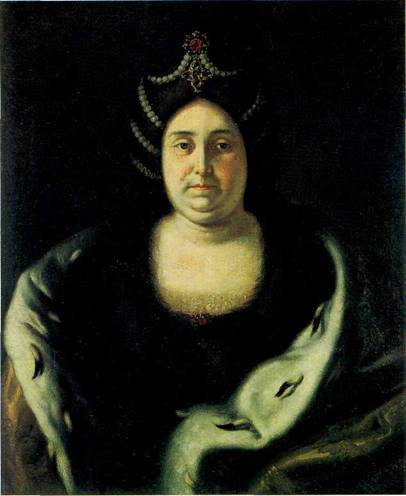
Tsarina Praskovia Saltykova
