= Praskovia Saltykova =

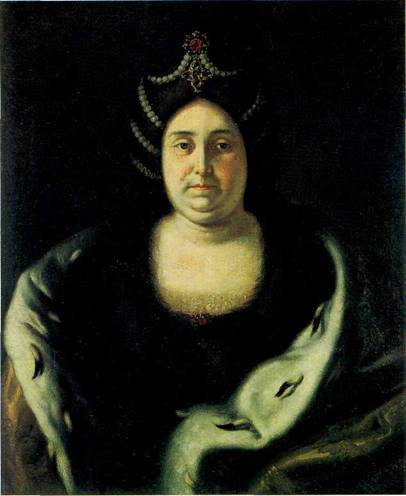
- Portrait by Ivan Nikitin

Tsaritsa consort of Russia
- Tenure: 9 January 1684 – 8 February 1696
- Predecessor: Marfa Apraksina
- Successor: Eudoxia Lopukhina (Alone)
- Co-Tsaritsa: Eudoxia Lopukhina (1689 - 1696)
- Born: 12 October 1664
- Died: 13 October 1723 (aged 59); Saint Petersburg
- Spouse: Ivan V (m. 1684; died 1696)
- Issue more...: Catherine, Duchess of Mecklenburg-Schwerin; Anna of Russia; Praskovia Ivanovna
Names
- Praskovia Fyodorovna Saltykova
- House: Romanov (by marriage)
- Father: Fyodor Petrovich Saltykov
- Mother: Anna Mikhailovna Tatishcheva

Praskovia Fyodorovna Saltykova (Russian: Прасковья Фёдоровна Салтыкова; 12 October 1664 – 13 October 1723) was the tsaritsa of Russia as the only wife of joint-Tsar Ivan V of Russia. She was the mother of Empress Anna of Russia. She played an important part as the most senior woman of the Russian court in 1698–1712.

== Life ==
Praskovia Fyodorovna was born into the old noble Saltykov family. She was the elder daughter of Fyodor Petrovich Saltykov and either Yekaterina Fyodorovna or of Anna Mikhailovna Tatischeva

=== Empress ===
The marriage of Ivan V was arranged by his sister, the regent Sophia, who wished to ensure the next heir to the throne through Ivan and his faction of the family rather than from his half brother and co-Tsar, Peter. Sophia was at the time the ruler of Russia in place of the two Tsars: the underage Peter and the mentally challenged Ivan. Reportedly, Prince Vasily Golitsyn advised Sophia that when Ivan V had a son, she could appoint Ivan's son to be his co-regent and place Peter in a monastery, thus securing her regency for a much longer period. Ivan V himself reportedly showed no inclination toward marriage, but did as he was told, and Sophia in fact chose his bride. According to the Swedish diplomat Hildebrandt Horn, Praskovia was not willing to marry Ivan, but was forced to consent.

She was selected as the bride of Tsar Ivan V through a traditional parade of potential candidates presented before him. This was the last use of this method to choose a tsaritsa in Russia. The wedding took place in the cathedral church on 9 January 1684, with Patriarch John officiating the ceremony. At the wedding, her father changed his name from Alexander Saltykov to Feodor in order to give Praskovia the patronymic Feodorovna, which was associated with the icon by Romanov and considered suitable for an empress.

At the time of her marriage, Praskovia Saltykova was described as a healthy Russian beauty, tall, with a full figure and long, thick hair, fully corresponding to the contemporary Russian ideal of beauty. She was also described as religious, superstitious and not very well educated.

Praskovia Saltykova was reportedly particularly devoted to the Virgin icon of Yaroslavl, and the Virgin Mother Icon of Kazan.

The marriage remained childless for five years. After five years, Praskovia started to have children, which was the reason why a marriage was arranged for Tsar Peter by his mother. Ivan V and Praskovia eventually had five daughters. Their lack of sons before a time when female succession was possible in Russia allowed Peter to usurp full power from Ivan more easily than may otherwise have been the case.

=== Dowager Empress ===
In 1696, Ivan V died. Praskovia Saltykova and her surviving three daughters retired from court and settled in the imperial country estate of Izmailovo outside Moscow. She was respectfully referred to in official documents as Her Majesty Tsarina Praskovia Feodorovna until her death.

Praskovia had a long affair with the boyar Vassili Yushkov, who was the head of her household and entrusted with the affairs and economy of her court.

Praskovia had great respect for her brother-in-law emperor Peter I, with whom she maintained a good relationship. Although she was raised in the old Russian Terem culture, she adjusted to the Westernized reforms of Peter out of respect for his authority as Tsar, an office she regarded to be holy. She gave her daughters a Western education and hosted entertainment receptions for Western visitors in her residence, thereby discontinuing the Terem system which had required her to live secluded. This was a contrast to many of Peter's other female relatives. Peter responded with gratitude and always treated her with respect and consideration, and often visited her and her daughters.

She had a friendly relationship to her sister-in-law Natalya, and helped her set up an amateur theater. She also helped Tsarina Evdokia to set up the celebrations of Tsar Peter's birthday and name day in her palace of Izmaylovo. In 1698, it is described how she arranged entertainment with music for the court.

Despite her willingness to adjust to the Petrine reforms, however, her outwardly Westernized court was described as full of old superstition. One of her most influential courtiers was Timothy Arkhipovich, who acted as her holy fool in the old Russian tradition.

At the fall and following execution of Tsarevich Alexei, Praskovia Saltykova was in fact implicated as a sympathizer of the Tsarevich and his conservative views, but Peter refused to act upon this because of his regard for her.

=== Saint Petersburg ===
In 1708, Praskovia Saltykova moved with her daughters and her entire household to the new capital of Saint Petersburg on the Tsar's orders, where their own palace had been allotted to them by the Neva. She was, however, allowed to visit Izmaylovo, which she often did. In contrast to many other female relations of Peter, Praskovia never refused to attend the Westernized entertainments, such as theater plays and masquerade balls, or to dress herself and her ladies-in-waiting in costumes on such occasions or to drink alcohol in gender-mixed parties, which was a part of Peter's reforms of upper class social and court life. During this period, after the divorce of Peter from his first wife and before his marriage to his next, Praskovia as well as Peter's sister ceremoniously acted as the first ladies of his court, as his new Western court needed a hostess for him to receive ambassadors and similar events in accordance with his desired Western standard.

In 1712, she and her daughters attended the wedding of Peter I and the future Catherine I of Russia.

In accordance with her reverence for the Tsar's office, she did not protest his right to arrange marriages for her daughters. When her daughter Anna left for Courland, Peter arranged for Praskovia to visit with her in Riga.

During her last years, Praskovia was affected by a deteriorating health and often visited spas for health reasons. In 1719, she visited the waters of Konchezerskoye, and the Olonets in 1721. During this period, she was also reported to drink very much. She received her eldest daughter Catherine when she escaped home to Russia from an abusive marriage in 1722.

In 1722, the courtier Vasily Derevnin stole her letters to her lover Vasily Yushkov. She had him illegally arrested and interrogated, during which he was reportedly severely abused. When Tsar Peter investigated the case, her servants who had acted on her orders were arrested and Yushkov was exiled to Nizhny Novgorod. The fate of Derevnina is unknown.

Praskovia Saltykova continued to participate in court life until her death, and hosted a birthday party for her youngest daughter shortly before her death. She was given a stately funeral by Tsar Peter, which became the first Imperial funeral hosted in the new capital of Saint Petersburg.

== Issue ==
- Maria Ivanovna (1689–1692)
- Feodosia Ivanovna (1690–1691)
- Ekaterina Ivanovna (1691–1733)
- Anna Ivanovna (1693–1740)
- Praskovia Ivanovna (1694–1731)

Praskovia Saltykova Born: 12 October 1664 Died: 13 October 1723
Russian royalty
| Vacant Title last held by Marfa Apraksina | Tsaritsa consort of Russia; 1684–1696 | Vacant Title next held by Eudoxia Lopukhina |
