= Supreme Privy Council =

Body of advisors to Russian Empress Catherine I (1725–1730)

The Supreme Privy Council (Russian: Верховный тайный совет, romanized: Verkhovnyy taynyy sovet) of Imperial Russia, founded on 19 February 1726 and operative until 1730, originated as a body of advisors to Empress Catherine I.

== History ==
Originally, the council comprised six members—Alexander Menshikov, Fyodor Apraksin, Gavriil Golovkin, Andrey Osterman, Peter Tolstoy, and Dmitry Mikhaylovich Golitsyn. Several months later, Catherine's son-in-law, Karl Friedrich, Duke of Holstein-Gottorp, joined the council. During Catherine's reign (1725–1727), her favorite, Prince Menshikov, dominated the council.

In her testament the Empress Catherine I authorized the council to wield power equal to that of her successor Peter II, except in matters of succession. Peter II, Catherine's step-grandson, assumed the throne on 6 May 1727; Menshikov organised for the 11-year-old Peter to become engaged to his 15-year-old daughter Maria Alexandrovna Menshikova (25 May 1727). By the time of Menshikov's downfall in September 1727 the council's make-up had changed drastically: Apraksin had died, Tolstoy had been exiled, and the Duke of Holstein had left Russia. Thereupon the Council expanded to eight members, of which six represented old boyar families opposing the Westernization reforms of Peter the Great—the Dolgorukovs and the Golitsyns. Osterman and Golovkin retained the other two seats.

As the conservative influence prevailed among its members, the council, although nominally a consultative body, monopolized supreme power and had the imperial capital moved de facto back to Moscow. The collegia (i.e., ministries) and the Senate, instituted by Peter the Great as supreme governing bodies, were held accountable before the Council rather than to the young Emperor. The Senate was renamed from "Governing" to "High".

After Peter II's death in 1730, the Council chose a rather improbable successor—the daughter of Tsar Ivan V, Anna Ivanovna, Duchess of Courland, whom they deemed easily amenable to manipulation and too conservative to restore Peter I's reforms. Anna was allowed to ascend the throne only after she had signed the famous "Conditions" which conferred on the council the powers of war and peace and of taxation. According to the Conditions, Anna couldn't promote officers to ranks higher than colonel or interfere in military affairs. She promised not to marry and not to choose her successor. The Council modelled the Conditions on the form of government recently instituted in Great Britain. If implemented, they could have led to Russia's transformation into a constitutional monarchy. If she were to violate the Conditions, Anna was to be dethroned.

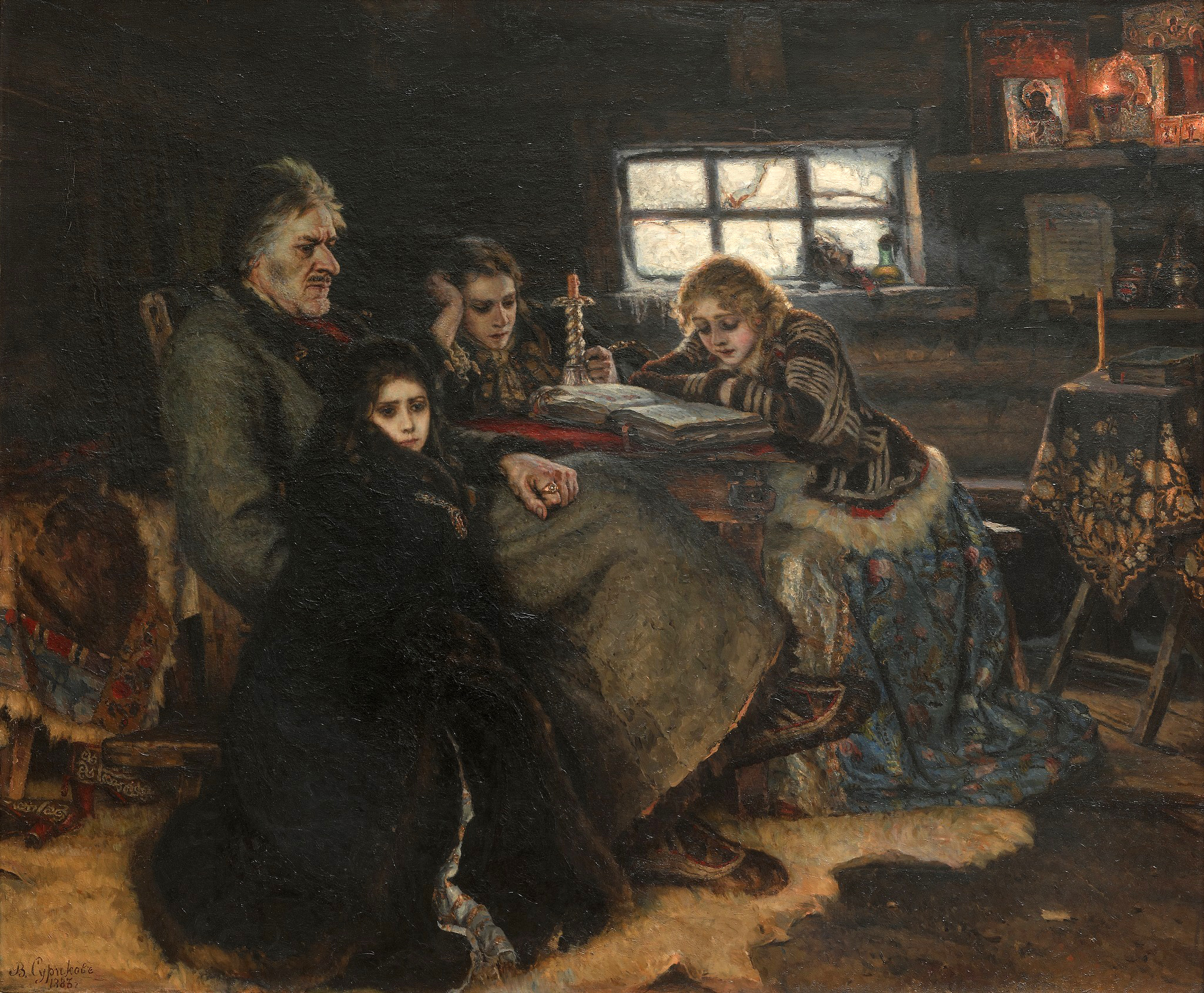
Menshikov in Beryozovo, Vasily Surikov

A month after signing the document, on 25 February 1730, Anna, on the advice of her close counsellor, Ernst Johann von Biron, won the sympathies of the Leib Guard and tore up the terms of her accession. Within days, the council was abolished and many of its members were exiled to Siberia.

== See also ==
- Privy Councillor (Russia)
- Active Privy Councillor
- Active Privy Councillor, 1st class
- Conditions (Russia)
