= Louis Caravaque =

French painter (1684–1754)

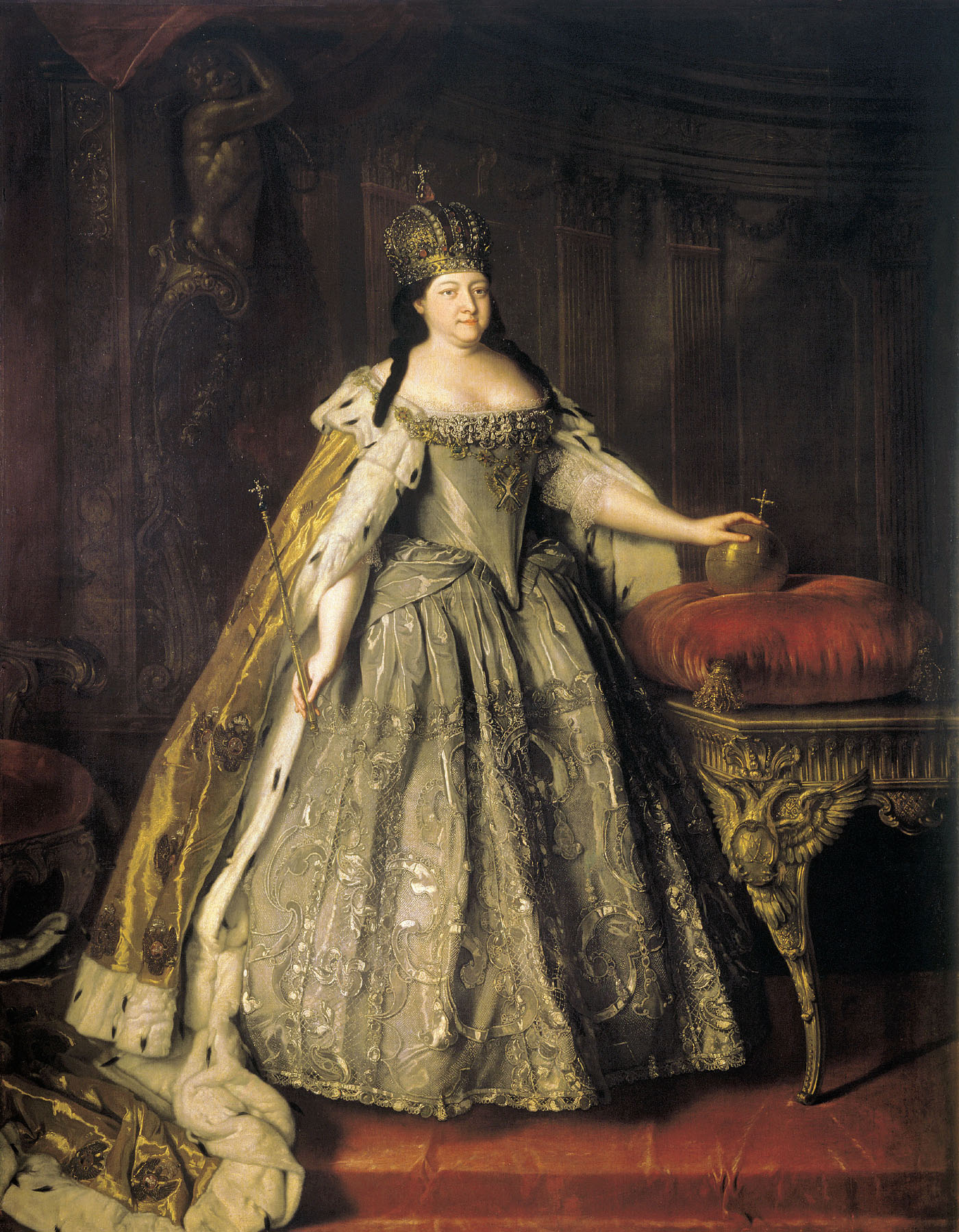
Portrait of Empress Anna Ioannovna, 1730, the Tretyakov Gallery, Moscow

Louis Caravaque (French pronunciation: [lwi kaʁavak]; 1684–1754) was a French portrait painter active mainly in Russia.

== Life ==
Caravaque was born in 1686 in Marseilles, Provence. He was born into a family of a painter-decorator who specialized in painting ships from Gascony. Caravaque followed in his father's footsteps, starting work at the Arsenal Galeries in Marseille. In 1715 in Paris he attracted the attention of Peter Lefort with his portraits, with whom he concluded a contract to work in Russia for three years as a painter and with the additional obligation of training Russian pupils. He went to Russia, and painted a portrait of Peter the Great at Astrakhan in 1716. It was engraved by Massard and by Langlois. Caravaque lived on Vasilyevsky Island near the Menshikov Palace, in his own house presented to him in 1722 by Peter I. He also lived in Moscow.

During Anna of Russia's reign, he was appointed "the first painter at court" (at first with a salary of 1500 rubles, later worked up to 2000 rubles a year), he painted her coronation portrait and took part in the decoration of the coronation celebrations. He remained as a goffmiller under Anna Leopoldovna and Elizaveta Petrovna. He became the author of the official "approved" image of Elisabeth as the new Empress. In May 1743 he was entrusted with a responsible order – to execute fourteen portraits of Elizabeth for Russian embassies abroad. He also participated in the decoration of her coronation.

He died in St. Petersburg, Russia, on June 9, 1754.

== Gallery ==
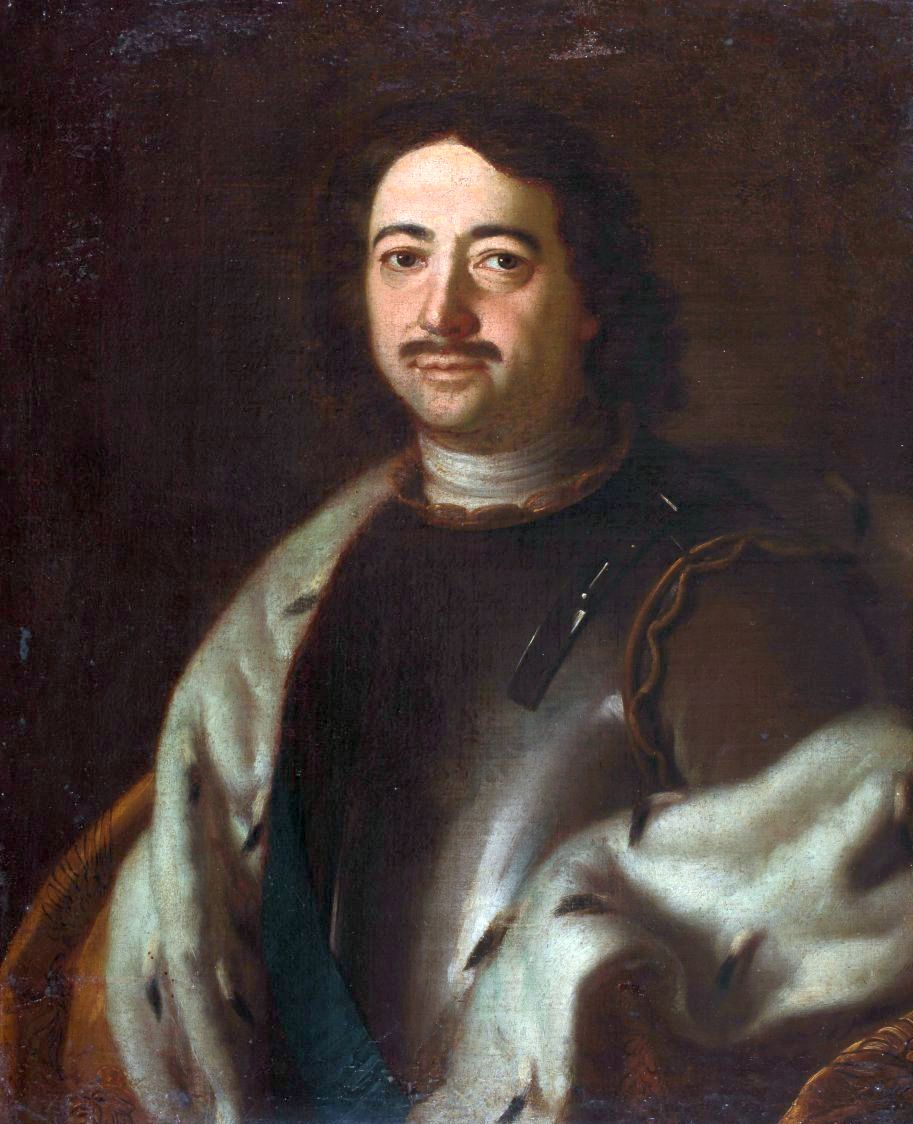
Portrait of Peter the Great

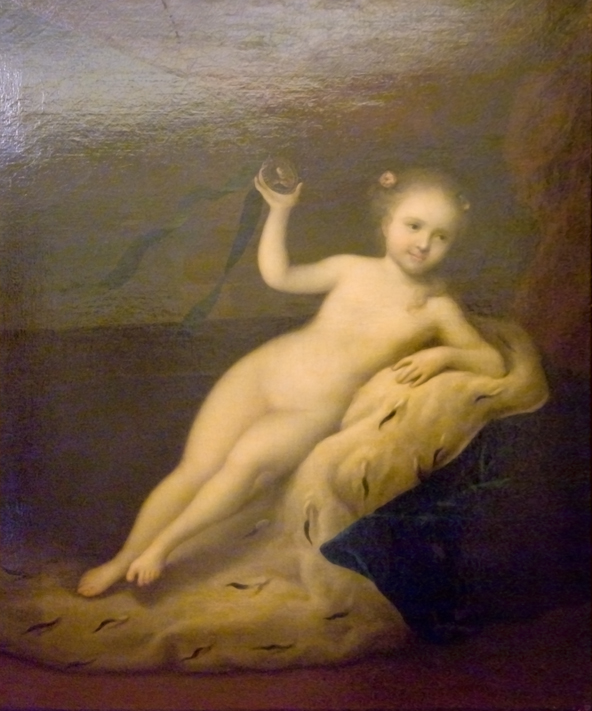
Portrait of the future Empress Elizabeth as an Olympic goddess, Russian Museum, St. Petersburg

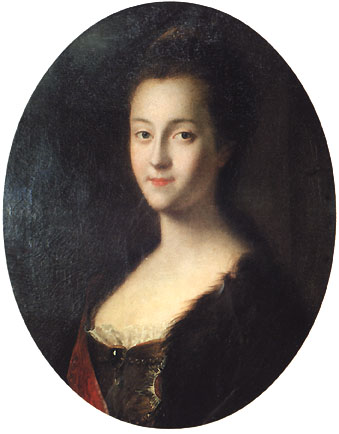
Portrait of Catherine II of Russia, 1745, Gatchina Palace

== Sources ==
- "Каравак, Людовик" . Brockhaus and Efron Encyclopedic Dictionary (in Russian). 1906.
