= Praskovya Ivanovna of Russia =

Daughter of Tsar Ivan V (1694–1731)

Praskovya Ivanovna
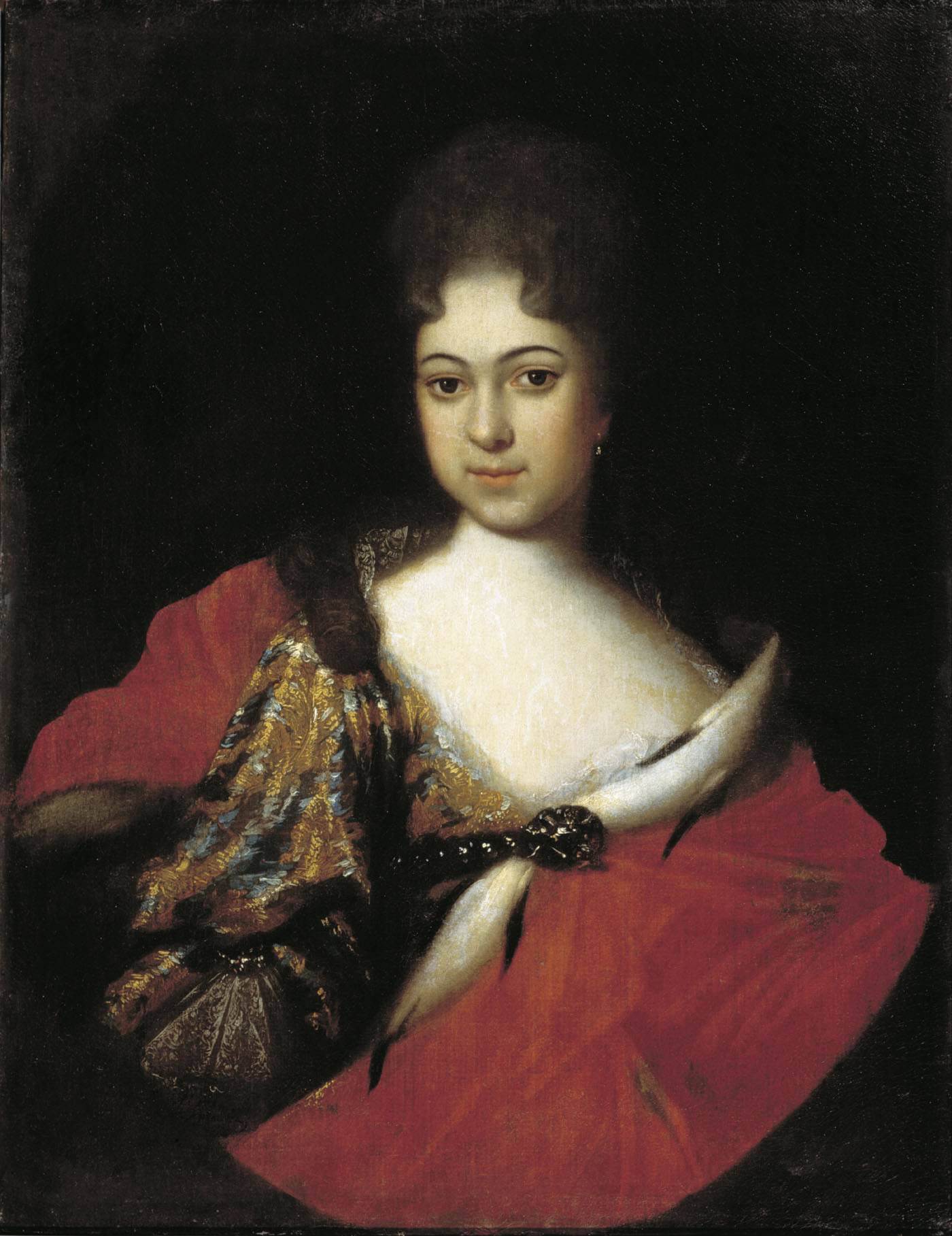
- Portrait by Ivan Nikitich Nikitin
- Born: 24 September 1694; Moscow
- Died: 8 October 1731 (aged 37); Saint Petersburg
- Burial: Peter and Paul Cathedral
- Spouse: Ivan Ilich Dmitriev-Mamonov
Names
- Praskovya Ioannovna
- House: Romanov
- Father: Ivan V of Russia
- Mother: Praskovia Saltykova

Praskovya Ivanovna (24 September 1694 – 8 October 1731) was a Russian tsarevna, being the daughter of Tsar Ivan V of Russia and his wife Praskovia Saltykova. She was the niece of Tsar Peter the Great and the sister of Empress Anna Ivanovna.

== Biography ==
Praskovya Ivanovna's father died in 1696, and she was raised with her sisters Catherine and Anna at the estate awarded to her mother by Tsar Peter, the Izmaylovo Estate in Moscow.

Praskovya was tutored in literature and science by German teachers. Praskovya was described by the Spanish ambassador in comparison to her sisters as lacking in intelligence, in addition to being very sickly. The court official, Bergholtz, described her in his journal as a “pretty brunette”, and the noblewoman Rondo noted that despite her bad health, she was quite beautiful.

In contrast to that of her sisters, Peter the Great did not arrange a dynastic marriage for Praskovya. By the consent of her mother, she was married to a Rurikid noble, general prince Ivan Dmitriev-Mamonov (1680–1730). They had one son in 1724, who died in approximately 1730. The marriage was an informal, private marriage and was not public, nor was the birth of their child.

According to Polovtsev, Praskovya was so accustomed to adjusting to the will of her mother and living in her household that she had difficulty adjusting to an independent life after the death of her mother. When her mother died in 1723, the shyness and indecision of Praskovya was demonstrated in her difficulty in handling the estate of her dead mother, and she started to hand out bribes to influential people of the court. She now became a part of the household of Catherine I.

During the reign of Peter II, Praskovya Ivanovna established her own court and reportedly lived extravagantly on the generous allowance awarded to her from the Imperial treasury, which in 1728 amounted about 12,000 rubles. In 1728, she was also granted her own residence in Moscow.

In 1730 her sister Anna Ivanovna succeeded to the throne as sovereign empress, after their older sister's claims was refused: the claim of Praskovya, being the younger sister, came after that of her sister Anna. Her sister's succession resulted in an increased allowance for Praskovya Ivanovna.
