= Conditions (Russia) =

18th-century project in Russia to limit the power of the Empress

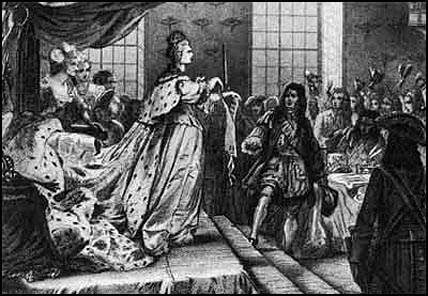
Empress Anna abrogates the Conditions

The Conditions (Russian: Кондиции, Konditsii, from Latin condicio) were an 18th-century legal document compiled by the Supreme Privy Council immediately after the death of Peter II and signed by Empress Anna of Russia in Mitau on 18 January 1730. It was giving substantial power to the Supreme Privy Council and some consider it to be the first constitutional project in Russian Empire. When the Empress returned to Russia, she revoked her approval of the Conditions and dissolved the Supreme Privy Council on the 20 February. The members of the council were removed from government and exiled or repressed.

== Terms ==
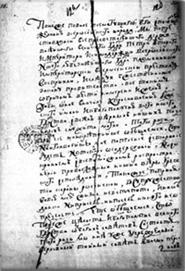
The text of the Conditions

The Conditions were formulated as a statement of the Empress herself. They were binding the monarch in relation to declarations of war, the signing of treaties, the imposing of new taxes, the appointing of officers to ranks higher than polkovnik (colonel), the depriving and granting of estates, appointments to the court ranks and the use of public revenues.

None of those powers could be exercised by the monarch under the Conditions without the approval of the Supreme Privy Council, or else the monarch would face the possibility of deposition.
