= Pyotr Andreyevich Tolstoy =

Russian statesman and diplomat (1645–1729)

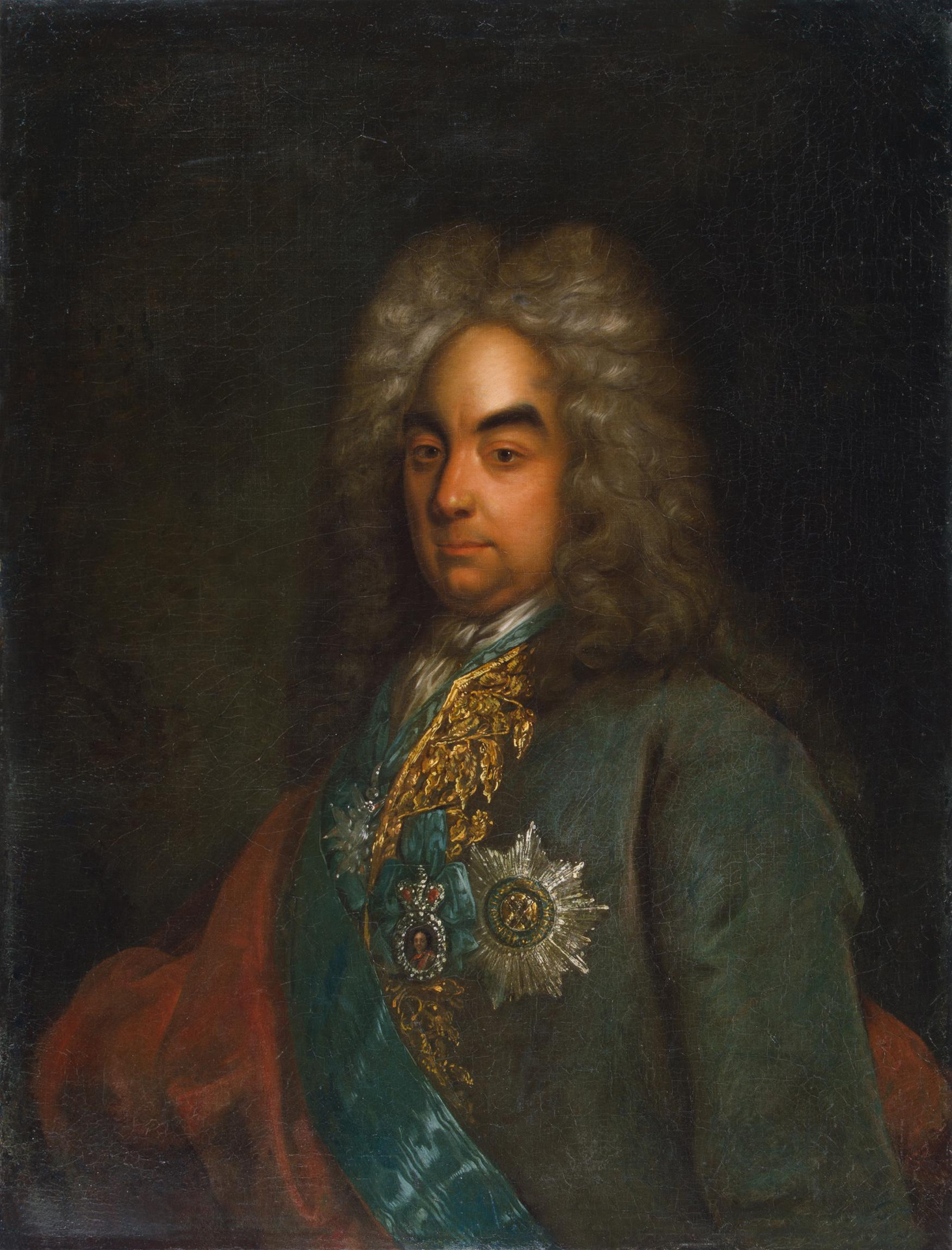
Count Peter A. Tolstoy

Count Pyotr Andreyevich Tolstoy (Russian: Граф Пётр Андреевич Толстой; 1645–1729) was a Russian statesman and diplomat, who played a central role in imperial politics during and after the reign of Peter the Great.

He served as Russia’s first formally accredited ambassador to the Ottoman Empire, became head of the Secret Chancellery, and was a key participant in major dynastic struggles of the early 18th century.

Tolstoy rose to power through diplomatic service and political loyalty, most notably for his role in locating and returning Tsarevich Alexei Petrovich to Russia in 1717. His influence continued under Catherine I, whom he supported during the succession crisis following Peter the Great’s death. After losing a power struggle at court, Tolstoy was exiled to the Solovetsky Monastery, where he died.

He is the ancestor of the noble Tolstoy family, which later produced prominent writers including Leo Tolstoy.

== Family and early life ==
Tolstoy was a Russian nobleman, statesman, and diplomat. He was born into a prominent Muscovite family, though historians differ on whether his lineage was that of an okolnichy or of boyar rank. He died in exile in 1729, aged about 84.

Tolstoy married Solomonida Timofeevna Dubrovskaya (1660–1722). The couple had two sons, Ivan (born 1685) and Peter (born 1680). Both sons died in exile with their father in the year before his death. Tolstoy was nevertheless survived by several grandchildren. In 1760, during the reign of Empress Elizabeth, daughter of Peter the Great, the Tolstoy family was recalled from disgrace, and its lands and honours were restored.

Pyotr Andreyevich Tolstoy is regarded as the principal ancestor of the Tolstoy noble family in the male line. Among his descendants were many statesmen, soldiers, and intellectuals, as well as several of Russia’s most prominent writers. These include Leo Tolstoy, Aleksey Konstantinovich Tolstoy, and Aleksey Nikolayevich Tolstoy. Other figures traditionally identified among his descendants include the philosopher Pyotr Chaadayev and the writer Vladimir Odoyevsky, though not all later Tolstoy lineages consistently trace their ancestry to him.

== Background ==
Some historians assume Pyotr Tolstoy to have been an "okolnichy", while others consider he came from a "boyar" background. He served in 1682 as Chamberlain at the court of childless Tsar Feodor III Alekseevich, Tsar 1676–1682. On account of his family relationship with the Miloslavsky family, he miscalculated the strength of the tsarevna Sophia Alekseyevna, (September 17 [N.S. September 27], 1657 – regent of Russia (1682–1689) – July 3 [N.S. July 14], 1704), full sister of Feodor III and third daughter, also, of Tsar Alexei I of Russia by his first wife, Maria Miloslavskaya and became one of her most energetic supporters, but contrived to join the other, and winning, side just before the final catastrophe.

Peter was the only son of Tsar Alexei I of Russia's second marriage (to Nataliya Kyrillovna Naryshkina), and therefore, was the younger half-brother of childless Tsar Feodor III and of Sophia, temporary regent of Russia. For a long time Peter kept his latest supporter at arm's length. However, in 1697, Tolstoy volunteered to go to Venice to learn Italian and ship-building, and Peter could not resist the subtle flattery implied in such a proposal from a middle-aged Muscovite noble.

== Career ==
=== Ambassador to the Ottoman Empire ===
In November 1701, Tolstoy was appointed the first regularly accredited Russian ambassador to the Ottoman Empire, known as The Sublime Porte, and in this demanding role, he more than justified the confidence of the most exacting of masters. Even before Poltava, Tolstoy had the greatest difficulty in preventing the Turks from aiding the Swedes.

When Charles XII took refuge on Turkish soil, Tolstoy instantly demanded his extradition. This diplomatic blunder only irritated the already alarmed Turks, and on 10 October 1710, Tolstoy was thrown into the Seven Towers, a proceeding tantamount to a declaration of war against Russia.

On his release, in 1714, he returned to Russia, was created a senator, and closely associated himself with the omnipotent favourite, Aleksandr Menshikov.

=== Role in the case of Tsarevich Alexei ===
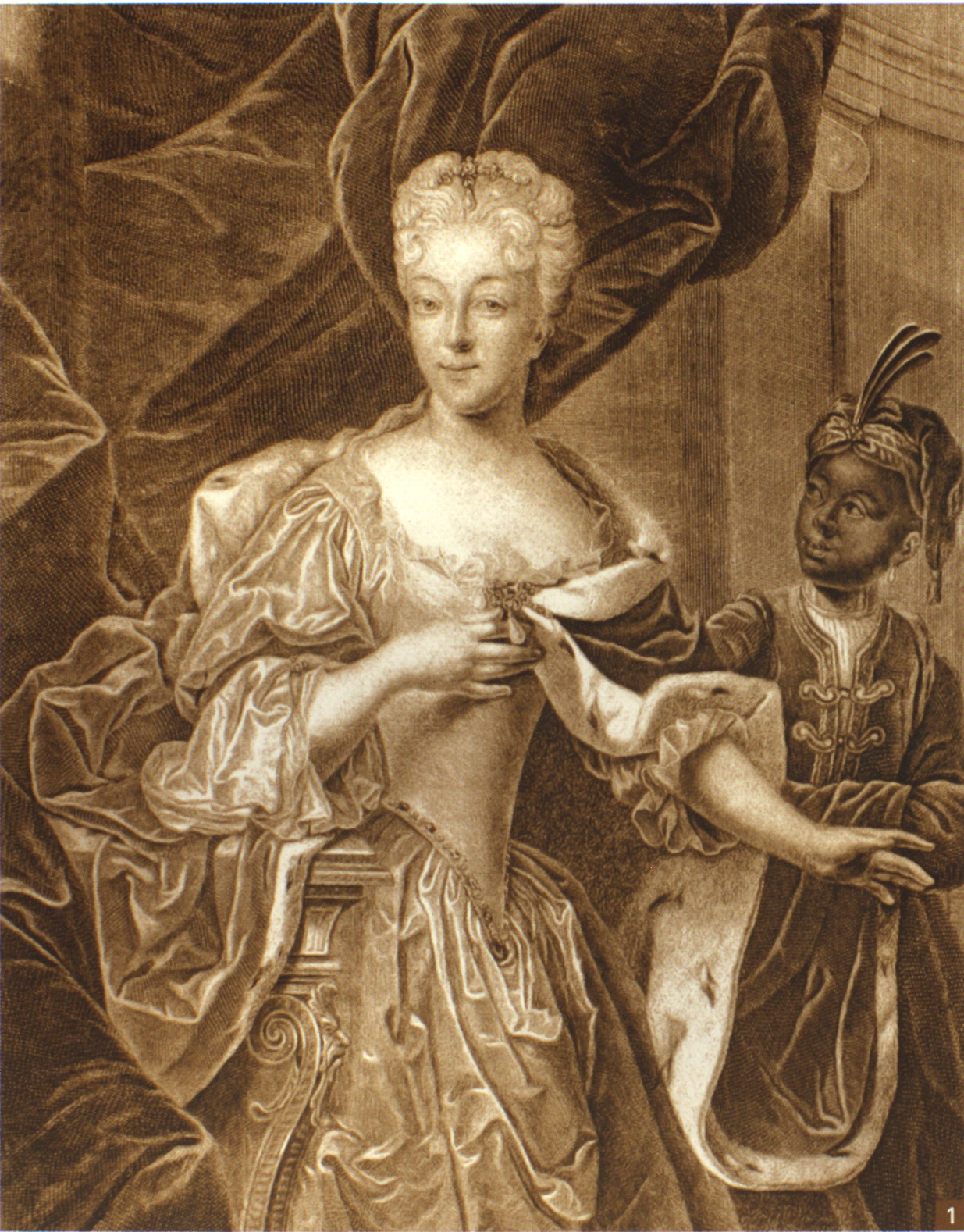
Princess Charlotte Christine of Brunswick-Wolfenbüttel, dead at 21, the wife of unfortunate tsarevich Alexei Petrovich, executed later, aged 28.

In 1717, his position during Peter's reign was secured once and for all by his successful mission to Naples to capture and bring back the unfortunate tsarevich Alexei Petrovich, the tsar's son. Alexei (born 28 February 1690) was later condemned to death by a council of 126 officials, members of the equivalent of the Russian Duma, acting on the wishes of his father. He died 7 July 1718 aged twenty-eight.

=== Head of the Secret Chancellery ===
As a result of his role in the pursuit and return of Tsarevich Alexei, Tolstoy earned the undying hatred of the majority of the Russian people; but Tsar Peter I naturally regarded it as an inestimable service and loaded Tolstoy with honours and riches, appointing him, moreover, the head of the Secret Chancellery, or official torture chamber, a post for which Tolstoy, nearly eighty years old by then, was by nature eminently fitted, as his vigorous prosecution of the Mons Affair (1724) made clear.

=== Support for Catherine I ===
He materially assisted Aleksandr Menshikov to raise the empress consort, to become Catherine I, (deceased less than two years later in 1727), to the throne on the decease of Peter in 1725, and the new sovereign made him a count and one of the six members of the newly instituted Supreme Privy Council (Верховный тайный совет).

Tolstoy was well aware that the elevation of the grand duke Peter II, son of the tsarevich Alexei, grandson of Piotr I would put an end to his own career and endanger his whole family.

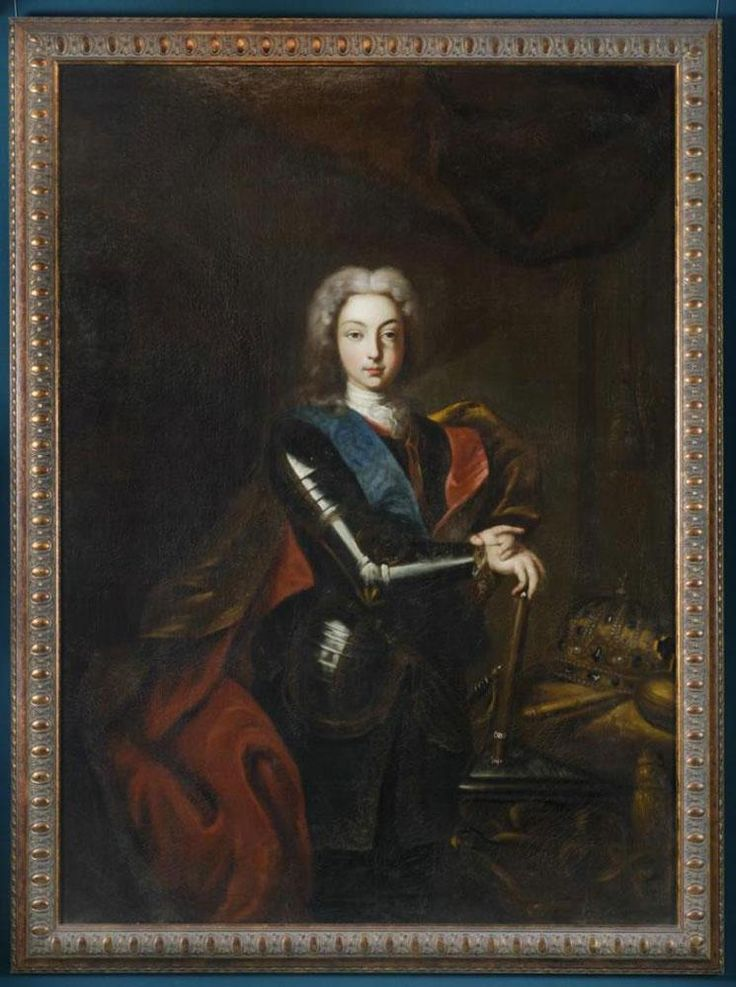
Peter II, Tsar and Autocrat of All the Russias.

Tsar Peter II Alexeyvich, here above, was the son of tsarevich Alexei Petrovich "Romanov", executed at age twenty-eight, the widower at twenty-five of German Princess Charlotte Christine, sister in law of Emperor Charles VI of Austria. Peter II, grandson of Peter I of Russia, was Tsar of Russia aged twelve, for three years, and died aged fifteen.

=== Fall from power and exile ===
Therefore, when Menshikov, during the last days of Catherine I, declared in favour of Peter, Tolstoy endeavoured to form a party of his own whose object it was to promote the accession of Catherine's second daughter, the tsarevna Elizabeth.

But Menshikov was too strong and too quick for his ancient colleague. On the very day of Empress Catherine I's death (11 May 1727), Tolstoy, now in his eighty-second year, was banished to the Solovetsky Monastery in the White Sea, where he died two years later.

Pyotr Tolstoy is the author of a sketch of the impressions made upon him by Western Europe during his tour in the years 1697–1698 and also of a detailed description of the Black Sea.

== Descendants ==
Not all the later family lineages of nobility bearing the last name of Tolstoy list Pyotr Andreyevich as their ancestor. However, it is among his direct descendants in the male line where we find all the known Tolstoy writers, among them Leo Tolstoy, Aleksey Konstantinovich Tolstoy, and Aleksey Nikolayevich Tolstoy (the former and the latter having notable descendants as well). There were a number of statesmen and soldiers descending from Pyotr Andreyevich, as Education and Interior Minister Dmitry Tolstoy.

His other notable descendants were such literati as the pioneering Russian philosopher Pyotr Chaadayev and Vladimir Odoyevsky.
