= Anna of Russia =

Empress of Russia from 1730 to 1740

Anna
- Tsarina
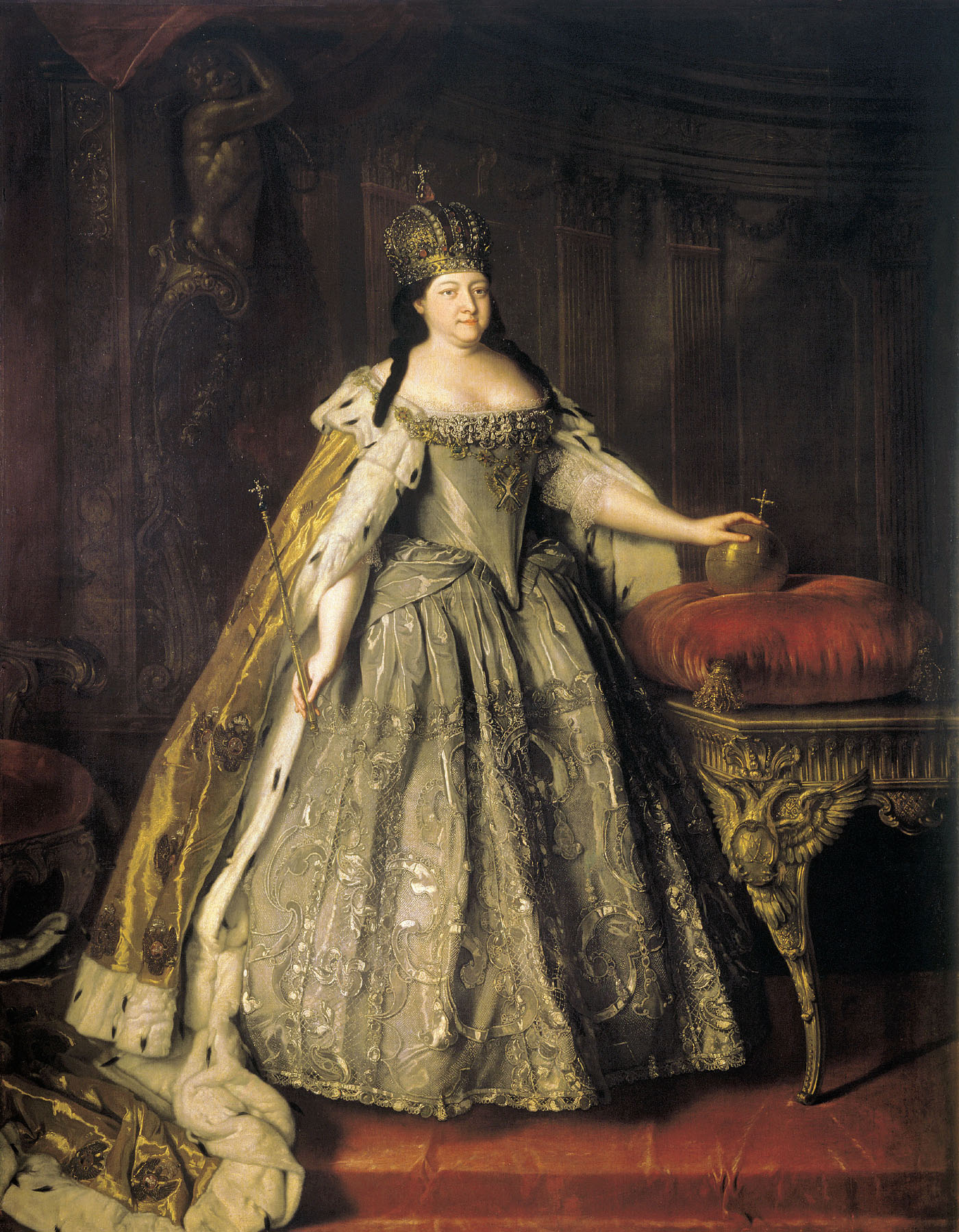
- Portrait by Louis Caravaque, 1730

Empress of Russia
- Reign: 26 February 1730 – 28 October 1740
- Coronation: 28 April 1730
- Predecessor: Peter II
- Successor: Ivan VI

Duchess consort of Courland
- Tenure: 11 November 1710 – 21 January 1711
- Born: 7 February 1693; Moscow, Russia
- Died: 28 October 1740 (aged 47); Saint Petersburg, Russia
- Burial: Peter and Paul Cathedral
- Spouse: Frederick William, Duke of Courland (m. 1710; died 1711)
Names
- Anna Ivanovna Romanova
- House: Romanov
- Father: Ivan V of Russia
- Mother: Praskovia Saltykova
- Religion: Russian Orthodox
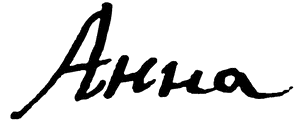
- Signature

Anna Ioannovna (Russian: Анна Иоанновна; 7 February [O.S. 28 January] 1693 – 28 October [O.S. 17 October] 1740), also russified as Anna Ivanovna and sometimes anglicized as Anne, served as regent of the Duchy of Courland and Semigallia from 1711 until 1730 and then ruled as Empress of Russia from 1730 to 1740. Much of her administration was defined or heavily influenced by actions set in motion by her uncle, Peter the Great (r. 1682–1725), such as the lavish building projects in St. Petersburg, funding the Russian Academy of Science, and measures which generally favored the nobility, such as the repeal of a primogeniture law in 1730. In the West, Anna's reign was traditionally viewed as a continuation of the transition from the old Muscovy ways to the European court envisioned by Peter the Great. Within Russia, Anna's reign is often referred to as a "dark era".

== Early life ==
Anna was born in Moscow as the daughter of Tsar Ivan V by his wife Praskovia Saltykova. Ivan V was co-ruler of Russia along with his younger half-brother Peter the Great, but he was mentally disabled and reportedly had limited capacity for administering the country effectively, and thus Peter effectively ruled alone. Ivan V died in February 1696, when Anna was only three years old, and Peter became the sole ruler of Russia.

Although Anna was the fourth child of her parents, she had only one surviving elder sister, Catherine, and one younger sister, Praskovya. After the death of her father in 1696, the family moved to Izmaylovo Estate. The three girls were raised in a disciplined and austere manner by their widowed mother, a stern lady of sterling character. Born into a family of relatively modest means, Praskovia Saltykova had been an exemplary wife to the mentally disabled Ivan, and expected her daughters to live up to her own high standards of morality and virtue. Anna grew up within a milieu which cherished womanly virtue and domesticity above all else, and placed strong emphasis on thrift, charity and religious observances. The girls were well-educated and studied French and German.

In 1708, Peter the Great brought the family to St Petersburg, where they were to live. This meant a change of not just location but also society, and this had a significant effect on Anna. She greatly enjoyed the splendour of court and the lavishness of high society, which was very different from the austerity preferred by her mother.

== Courland Regency ==
In the early 1700s, Peter tried to, but was unable, to conquer and annex Courland. To increase his influence there, he convinced Friedrich Wilhelm I to arrange for his nephew, 17-year-old Frederick William, Duke of Courland, to marry Anna, who was approximately the same age. Her wedding was held on a grand scale, as per her own inclinations, on 11 November 1710; and her uncle gave her a dowry of 200,000 roubles. At the feast which followed the wedding, two dwarfs performed a parody by jumping out of enormous pies and dancing on the tables.

The newly wedded couple spent several weeks in the Russian Empire before proceeding to Courland. Only twenty miles out of St. Petersburg, on the road to Courland, on 21 January 1711, Duke Frederick died. The cause of death was uncertain: it has been attributed variously to a chill or to the effects of alcohol.

After her husband died, Anna proceeded to Mitau (now known as Jelgava), the capital of Courland (now western Latvia) and ruled that province for almost twenty years, from 1711 to 1730. During this period, the Russian resident, Count Peter Bestuzhev, was her adviser (and sometimes lover). She never remarried after the death of her husband, but her enemies claimed she conducted a love affair with Duke Ernst Johann von Biron, a prominent courtier, for many years.

== Accession ==
Imperial monogram of Anna

In 1730, Tsar Peter II (grandson of Anna's uncle Peter the Great) died childless at a young age. His death rendered extinct the male line of the Romanov dynasty, which had ruled Russia for over a century, since 1613. There were four possible candidates for the throne: the three surviving daughters of Ivan V, namely Catherine (born 1691), Anna herself (born 1693) and Praskovya (born 1694), and the sole surviving daughter of Peter the Great, Elizabeth (born 1709).

Ivan V had been the older brother of Peter the Great and co-ruler with him, and by that reckoning, his daughters may be considered to have the prior claim. However, if seen from the perspective that the successor should be the nearest kin of the most recent monarch, then the daughters of Peter the Great were nearer to the throne, because they were the aunts of the recently deceased Tsar Peter II. The dilemma was made greater because the daughters of Peter the Great had been born out of wedlock, and had been legitimized later by him, after he formally married their mother Catherine I, who had previously been a maid in his household. On the other hand, Praskovia Saltykova, the wife of Ivan V, had been a nobleman's daughter and a devoted wife and mother; moreover, she had been a lady greatly respected for her many virtues, not least her chastity.

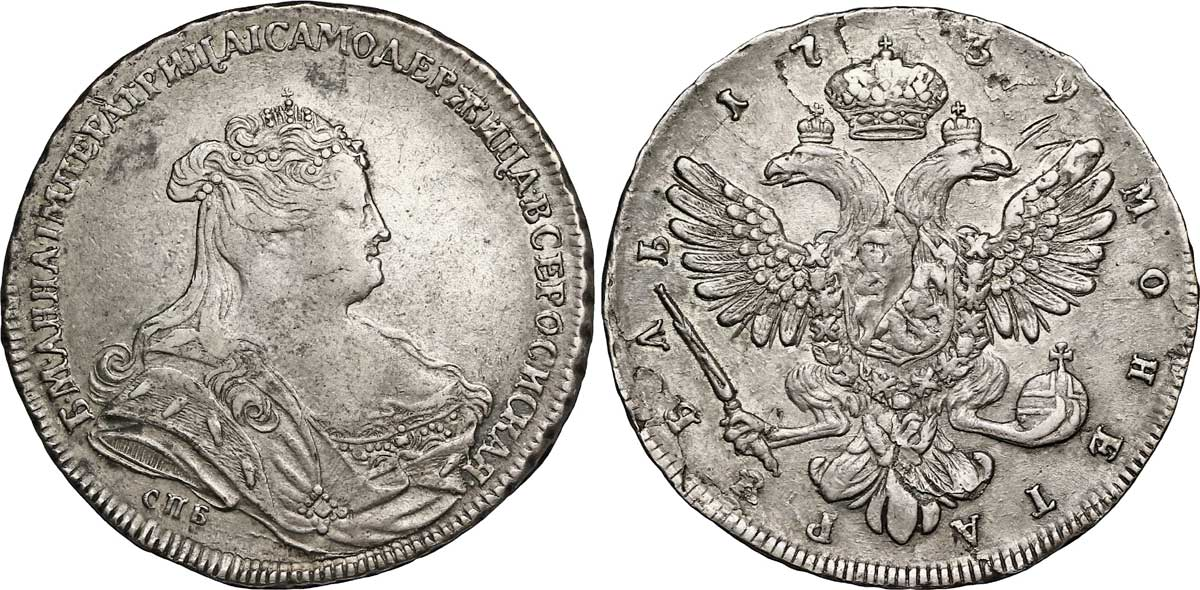
Coinage of Anna of Russia

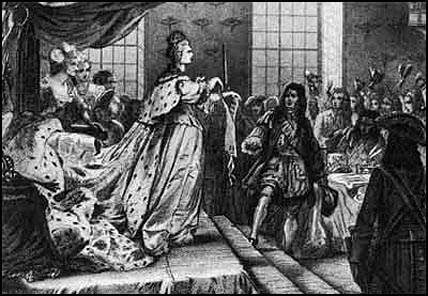
Empress Anna abrogates the "Conditions"

The Russian Supreme Privy Council led by Prince Dmitri Golitzyn selected Anna to be the new Empress of Russia. She was selected in preference to her elder sister Catherine even though Catherine was at that time resident in the Russian Empire whereas Anna was not. There were some reasons for this: Anna was a childless widow and there was therefore no immediate danger of an unknown foreigner wielding power in Russia; she also had some experience of government, because she had been administering her late husband's duchy of Courland for almost two decades. Catherine, on the other hand, was married to Karl Leopold, Duke of Mecklenburg-Schwerin. She was now separated from him and living in the Russian Empire, which was in itself seen as disgraceful; and whether her husband was present or absent, his existence could raise problems at her very coronation. His intervention in government affairs at some later point could hardly be prevented, especially since Catherine had a daughter by him. In that event, since he was a ruling prince of ancient lineage with years of experience, it was thought he would not be as amenable to the council's advice as a Russian princess would be. Also, the fact that Catherine had a daughter already would provide a certainty of succession which the nobles perhaps preferred not to have.

The Supreme Privy Council preferred the childless and widowed Duchess of Courland. They hoped that she would feel indebted to the nobles and remain a figurehead at best, and malleable at worst. To make sure of that, the Council had Anna sign a declaration of "Conditions" to her accession, modeled after a Swedish precedent, which stated that Anna was to govern according to their counsel and was not permitted to declare war, call for peace, impose new taxes or spend the revenue of the state without their consent. Without the consent of the council, she could not punish nobility without trial, make grants of estates or villages, appoint high officials, or promote anyone (foreign or Russian) to court office.

The deliberations of the council were held even as Peter II lay dying of smallpox during the winter of 1729–30. The document of "Conditions" was presented to Anna in January, and she signed it on 18 January 1730, which was just around the time of his death. The ceremony of endorsement was held at her capital, Mitau in Courland (now known as Jelgava), and she then proceeded to the Russian capital. On 20 February 1730, shortly after her arrival, Empress Anna exercised her prerogative to do away with her predecessor's Privy Council and dissolved that body. The Supreme Privy Council which had stipulated those "Conditions" had been composed largely of the families of the princes Dolgorouki and Galitzin. Within a matter of days, another faction rose at court which was opposed to the domination of these two families. On 7 March 1730, a group of people belonging to this faction (numbering between 150 and 800 people, depending on the source) arrived at the palace and petitioned the empress to repudiate the "Conditions" and assume the autocracy of her predecessors. Among those who urged Anna to do so was her elder sister Catherine. Anna duly repudiated the document of Conditions, and had some of the framers of the document hanged, and many others exiled to Siberia. She then assumed autocratic powers and ruled as an absolute monarch, in the same fashion as her predecessors. On the night that Anna tore up the Conditions, an aurora borealis appeared in the sky, making the horizon "appear in all blood" in the words of one contemporary, which was widely taken to be a dark omen of what Anna's reign would be like.

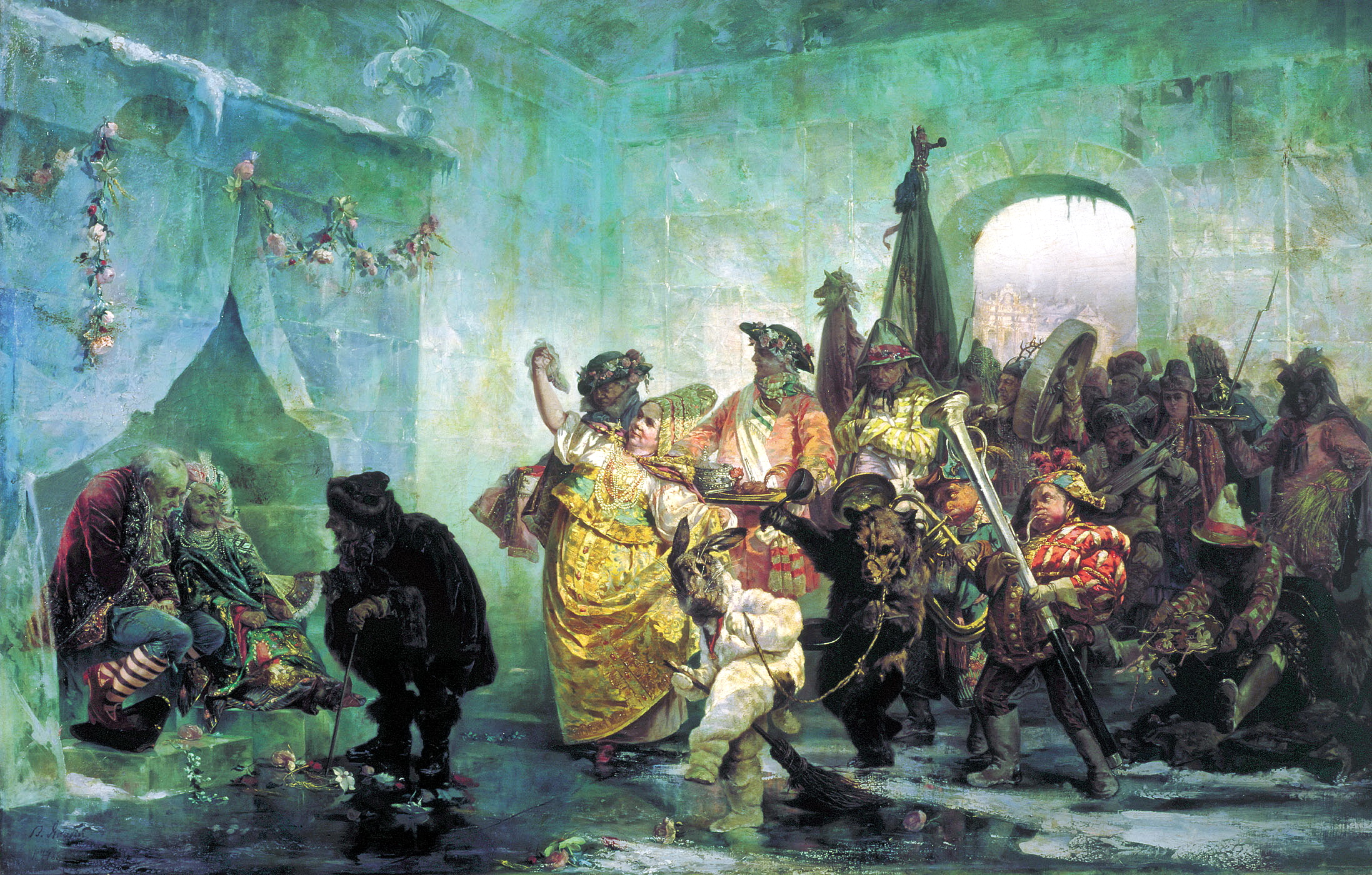
In this 1878 painting by Valery Jacobi, the scared newlyweds Mikhail Golitsyn and Avdotya Buzheninova sit on the icy bed to the left; the jocular woman in golden dress is Empress Anna.

Strong-willed and eccentric, Anna was known for her cruelty and vulgar sense of humor. She forced Prince Mikhail Alekseevich Golitsyn to become her court jester and had him married off to her unattractive Kalmyk maid Avdotya Buzheninova. To celebrate the wedding, the Empress had an ice palace measuring thirty-three feet high and eighty feet long built together with icy beds, steps, chairs, windows and even logs of ice in a fireplace of ice. Prince Golitsyn and his bride were placed in a cage atop an elephant and paraded through the streets to this structure, to spend their wedding night in the ice palace, despite it being an extremely cold night in the dead of winter. Empress Anna told the couple to make love and keep their bodies close if they did not wish to freeze to death. Eventually, the couple survived when Avdotya Buzheninova Golitsyn traded a pearl necklace for a sheepskin coat from one of the guards.

Anna kept a shotgun by her window so she could shoot birds when she felt the urge to hunt.

== Empress of Russia ==
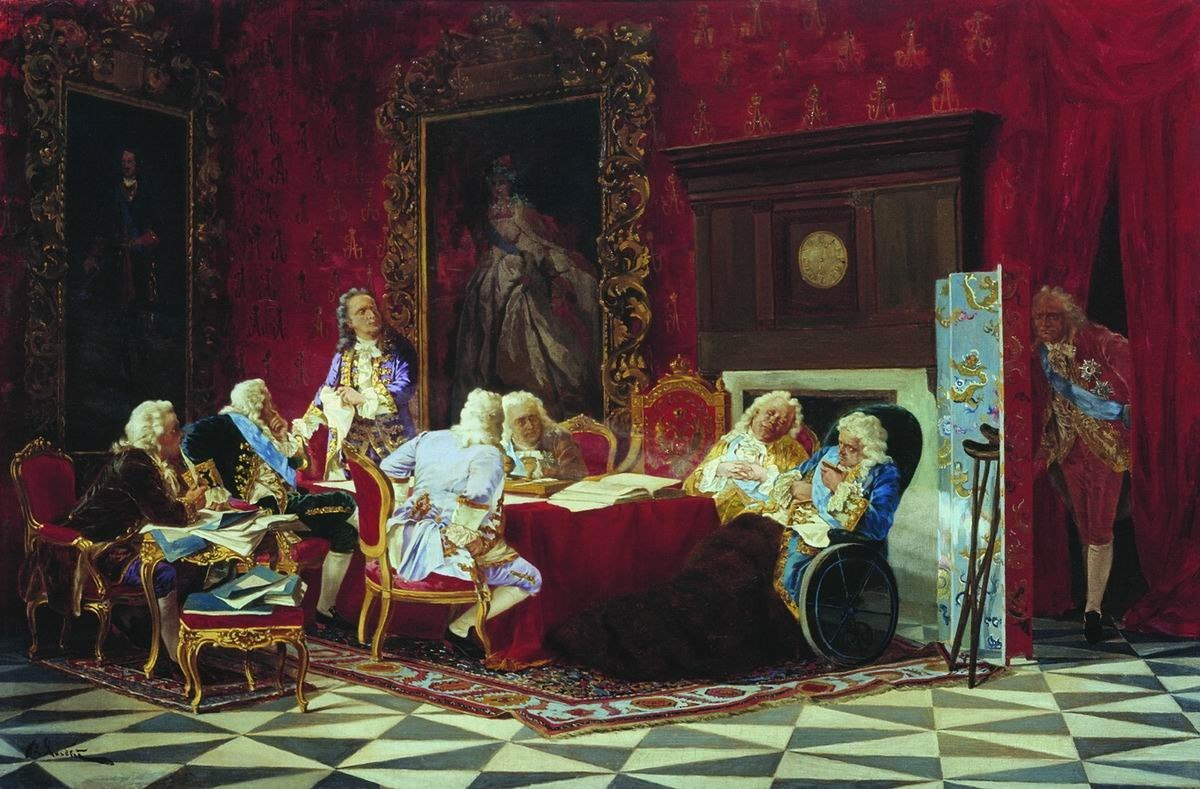
Cabinet Ministers of Empress Anna Ivanovna, painting by Valery Jacobi (Note: In Jacobi's ironic and critical historical pastiche, the thoroughly Frenchified ministers, their weaknesses symbolized by crutches and a rolling invalid's chair, are dominated by the absent presence of the Empress, through her empty seat at table and her shadowed portrait looming on the wall; at right a courtier behind the screen eavesdrops on the proceedings.)

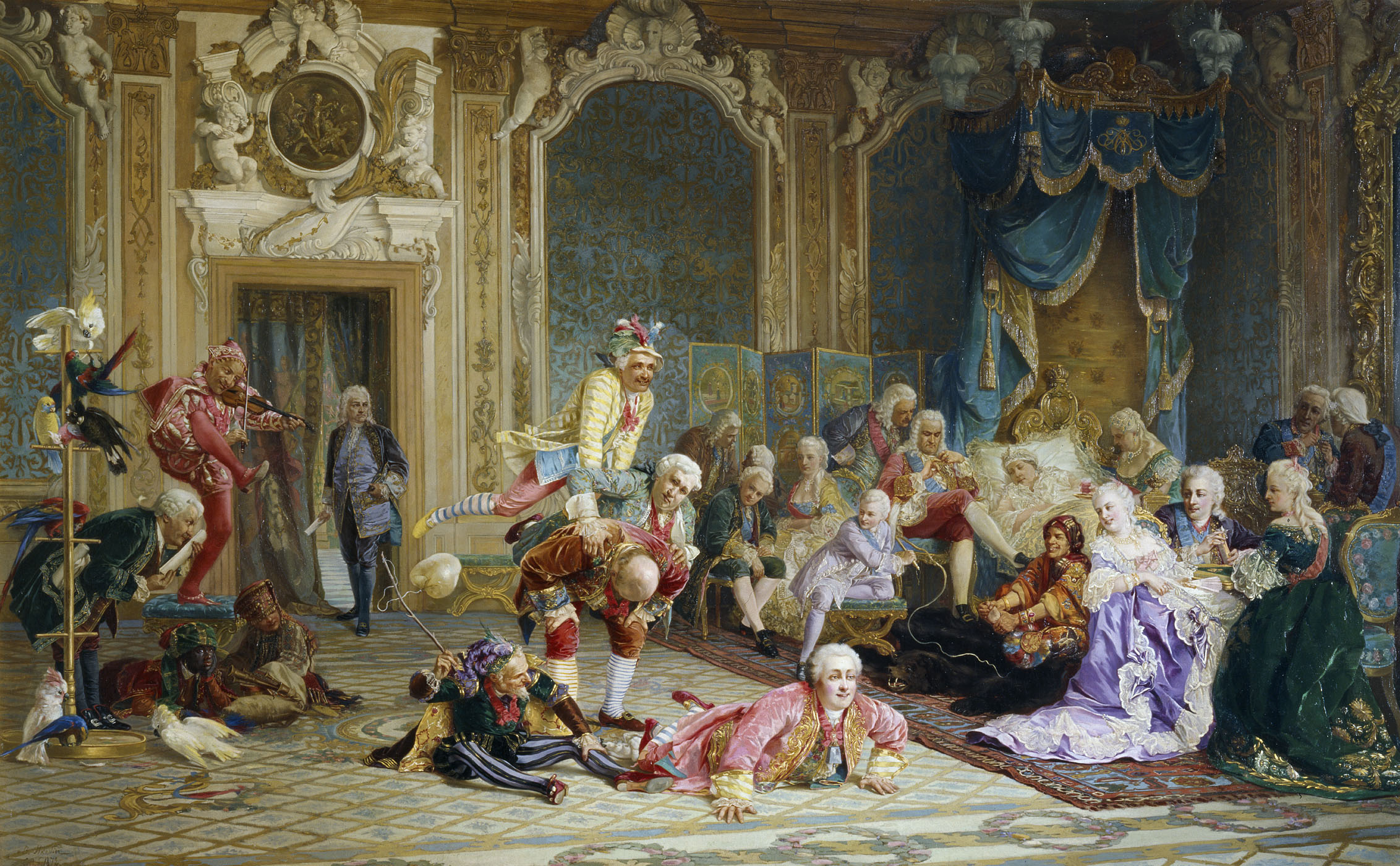
Court jesters of Empress Anna Ivanovna, painting by Valery Jacobi

Anna continued to lavish architectural projects on St. Petersburg. She completed a waterway that began construction under Peter the Great and called for seafaring ships to accompany this new canal and continue naval expansion.

Anna's lover Ernst Johann von Biron was a Baltic German and due to his influence Baltic Germans were favored with government offices, leading to the resentment of the ethnic Russian nobility, though the American historian Walter Moss cautioned that the popular image of the Bironovschina as one of total Baltic German domination of Russia is exaggerated.

=== Cadet Corps ===
Anna founded the Cadet Corps in 1731, one year after coming to the throne. The Cadet Corps was a group of young boys starting at the age of eight being trained for the military. It incorporated a very rigorous training program which included all the schooling necessary for someone to hold an important position in the military. As time went on, the program was improved upon by other emperors and empresses, such as Catherine the Great. These began to include the arts and sciences into cadets' schooling, alongside established studies of military topics.

=== Academy of Science ===
Anna continued to fund the Russian Academy of Science, started by Peter the Great. This school was designed to further the sciences in Russia, in order to help the country reach the level of Western European countries of that period. Some of the subjects taught were mathematics, astronomy, and botany. The Academy of Science was also responsible for many expeditions; a notable example was the Bering Sea Expedition. While attempting to determine if America and Asia had been at one point connected, Siberia and its people were also studied. These studies were referenced long after the expedition returned from Siberia. The academy suffered interference from outside parties. Frequently the government and the church would meddle with funding and experimentation, altering data to match their respective points of view. This school of science was very small, never exceeding an enrollment of twelve students in the university and barely over a hundred in the secondary school. Still, it was a huge step forward for education in the Russian Empire. Many of the teachers and professors were imported from the Holy Roman Empire, bringing a Western viewpoint to instruction students received. Some of the students taught by these German professors later became advisors or teachers to future leaders, such as Catherine the Great's tutor, Adodurov. During Anna's reign the Academy of Science began to include the Arts into the program, as there was no school for the arts yet, and the Empress was a firm supporter of the arts. Theatre, architecture, engraving, and journalism were all added to the curriculum. It was during this time the foundation of what is now the Russian ballet was laid down.

=== The Secret Office of Investigation ===
Anna resurrected the Secret Office of Investigation, whose purpose was to punish those convicted of political crimes, although some cases were occasionally taken that were not of a political nature. It has been rumored since Anna's reign that Biron was the power behind the Secret Office of Investigation when in fact it was run by the senator A. I. Ushakov. The punishments meted out for the convicted were often very painful and disgusting. For example, some people that had supposedly been plotting against the government had their noses slit in addition to being beaten with the knout. Russian authorities listed a total of around 20,000 Russians—including some of the highest native nobility—who fell victim to Biron and Anna's police.

=== Office for the Affairs of New Converts ===
The government under Anna established an Office for the Affairs of New Converts in 1740 to expand the conversion to Orthodoxy. The office which was situated in the Bogoroditsky Monastery in Kazan was staffed by monks and aided by state authorities. Under the empress' decree, they presided under a huge increase in conversions, where converts were provided goods and cash in return for a "reward for accepting baptism". However, intimidation and violence also played a role in conversions, as a Chuvash petition described how the clergy "mercilessly beat them and baptized them against their will". In addition, hundreds of mosques were destroyed. By the 1750s, over 400,000 pagans and Muslims had converted.

=== Nobility ===
Anna gave many privileges to the nobility. In 1730 she ensured the repeal of Peter the Great's primogeniture law prohibiting the division of estates among heirs. Starting in 1731 landlords were made responsible for their serfs' taxes, which had the effect of tightening their economic bondage further. In 1736, the age for a noble to begin his compulsory service to the state changed to 20 with a 25-year service time. Anna and her government also determined that if a family had more than one son, one could now stay behind to run the family estate.

=== Westernization ===
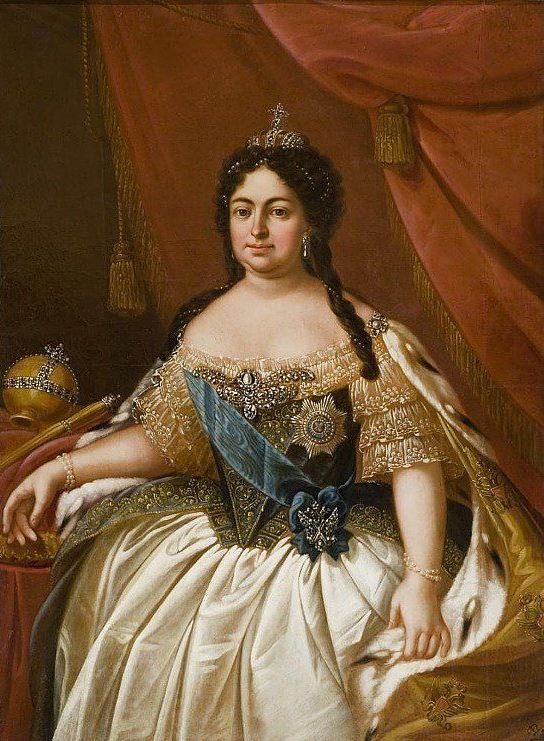
Portrait of Anna by an unknown Russian artist, 18th century

Westernization continued after Peter the Great's reign in areas of prominent Western culture such as the Academy of Science, cadet corps education, and imperial culture including theater and opera. Although not at the fast-paced speed of Westernization under her Uncle Peter's reign, it is evident that a culture of the expansion of knowledge continued during Anna's rule and affected mostly the nobility. It is argued that this success in Westernization is due to the efforts of the German court nobility; the foreigners' impacts are viewed both positively and negatively.

Anna's reign was different from that of other imperial Russian rulers in one respect: her court was almost entirely made up of foreigners, the majority of whom were German. Some observers have argued that historians isolate her rule from Russian history due to their long-term prejudice towards Germans, towards whom Anna seems to have been sympathetic.

There is a lot of mention of Germans throughout the reign of Anna. For example, she often gave them ruling positions in her cabinet and other important decision-making positions. This was because she had very little trust in the Russians. It was because of this strong German influence in government that many Russians came to resent them.

The Imperial Theatre School, known as Vaganova Academy of Russian Ballet after 1957, was founded during Anna's reign on May 4, 1738. It was the first ballet school in Russia, as well as the second in the world. The school was established through the initiative of the French ballet master and teacher Jean-Baptiste Landé.

=== Foreign affairs ===
During Anna's reign Russia became involved in two major conflicts, the War of the Polish Succession (1733–1735) and another Turkish war. In the former, Russia worked with Austria to support Augustus II's son Augustus against the candidacy of Stanisław Leszczyński who was dependent on the French and amiable with Sweden and the Ottomans. Russia's involvement with the conflict was quickly over, however, and the Russo-Turkish War (1735–1739) was much more important.

In 1732, Nader Shah had forced Russia to return the lands in northern Iran that had been taken during Peter the Great's Russo-Persian War; the Treaty of Resht furthermore permitted an alliance against the Ottoman Empire, the common enemy and, in any case, the provinces of Shirvan, Ghilan, and Mazanderan had been a net drain on the imperial treasury for the entirety of their occupation. Three years later, in 1735, conforming to the Treaty of Ganja, the remainder of the territories taken more than a decade earlier from Iran in the North Caucasus and South Caucasus were returned as well.

The war against the Ottoman Empire took four and a half years, a hundred thousand men, and millions of rubles; its burdens caused great stress on the people of the Russian Empire, and it only gained the Russian Empire the city of Azov and its environs. Its effects, however, were greater than they first appeared. Osterman's policy of southern expansion prevailed over the 1711 Peace of Pruth signed by Peter the Great. Munnich had given the Russian Empire its first campaign against the Ottoman Empire that had not ended in crushing disaster and dissipated the illusion of Ottoman Empire invincibility. He had further shown that the Russia Empire's grenadiers and hussars could defeat twice their number of janissaries and spahis. The Tatar hordes of the Khanate of Crimea had been exterminated and the Russian Empire's signal and unexpected successes greatly increased its prestige within Europe. (Note: The English minister Claudius Rondeau noted soon after that "This court begins to have a great deal to say in the affairs of Europe".)

The Russians also established a protectorate over the khan of the Kirghiz, sending officers to assist his short-lived conquest of the Khanate of Khiva.

Two Qing dynasty embassies to Anna's court, first at Moscow in 1731, then at St Petersburg the following year, were the only ones China dispatched to Europe through the 18th century. These embassies were unique also in that they represented the only occasions where officials of the Chinese Empire kowtowed before a foreign ruler.

== Relationship with Biron ==
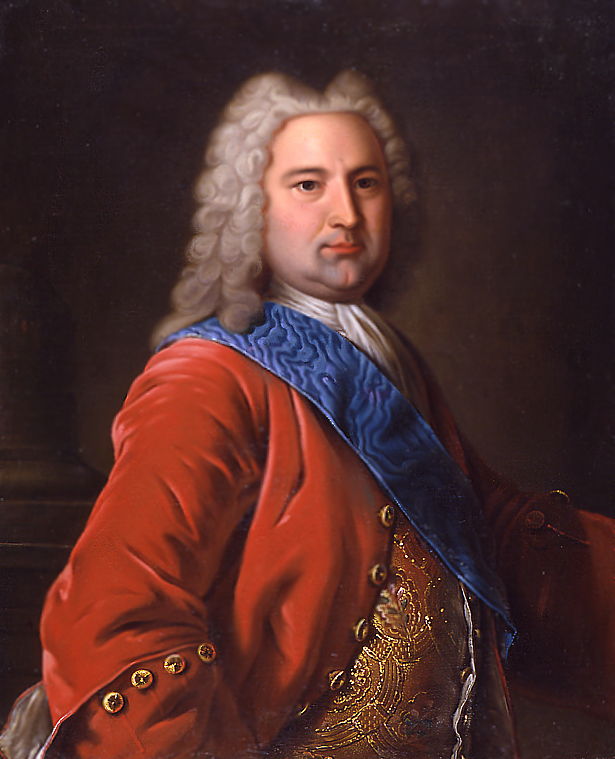
Portrait of Ernst Johann Biron

After being widowed just weeks following her wedding, Anna never remarried. As empress of Russia, she enjoyed the power she held over all men and may have thought that marriage would undermine her power and position. Nevertheless, Anna's reign is often referred to as "The Age of Biron" (Bironovschina), after her German lover Ernst Johann Biron. Historians concur that Biron not only had a strong influence on Anna's domestic and foreign policies, but also that at times he wielded power solely without reference to the Empress. Anna was attracted to Biron's personal charm and he proved to be a good companion to her, but his name became synonymous with cruelty and terror. In public perception these negative qualities became the hallmark of Anna's reign.

== Death and succession ==
As her health declined Anna declared her grandnephew, Ivan VI, as her successor and appointed Biron as regent. This was an attempt to secure the line of her father, Ivan V, and exclude the descendants of Peter the Great from inheriting the throne. It was recorded that she had an ulcer on her kidneys, and she continued having attacks of gout; as her condition worsened, her health began to fail.

Anna died on 28 October 1740 at the age of 47 from a kidney stone that made for a slow and painful death. The tsaritsa's final words focused on Biron. Ivan VI was only a two-month-old baby at the time, and his mother, Anna Leopoldovna, was detested for her German counsellors and relations. As a consequence, shortly after Anna's death, Elizabeth Petrovna, legitimized daughter of Peter the Great, managed to gain the favor of the populace, locked Ivan VI in a dungeon, and exiled his mother. Anna was buried three months later on 15 January 1741, leaving behind uncertainty for the future of Russia.

== Legacy ==
In the West, Anna's reign was traditionally viewed as a continuation of the transition from the old Muscovy ways to the European court envisioned by Peter the Great. Her severe government was universally unpopular. Within Russia Anna's reign is often referred to as a "dark era". Her unpopularity also derived from personality flaws. Even considering the need of Russian rulers to avoid displays of weakness, Anna's rule involved questionable actions towards her subjects. She was known to enjoy hunting animals from the palace windows and, on more than a few occasions, humiliated individuals with disabilities. The issues of serfdom, peasant and lower class slavery, taxation, dishonesty, and rule through constant fear persisted in Russia during her rule. Her empire was described by Lefort, the Saxon minister, as being "comparable to a storm-threatened ship, manned by a pilot and crew who are all drunk or asleep. . . with no considerable future". Anna's war with the Ottoman Empire, economic issues, and conspiracy revolving around her accession all bring to light an ominous glow of the empress' reign. She restored the court in St. Petersburg and brought Russia's political atmosphere back to where Peter the Great had intended, and its grandeur was almost unmatched in Europe or Asia; but such lavish court life was overshadowed by the thousands of men slaughtered in war.

== See also ==
- Bibliography of Russian history (1613–1917)
- Tsars of Russia family tree

== Notes ==
Anna of Russia House of Romanov
Royal titles
Preceded by Elisabeth Sophie of Brandenburg	Duchess consort of Courland; 11 November 1710 – 21 January 1711	Succeeded by Johanna Magdalene of Saxe-Weissenfel
Regnal titles
Preceded by Peter II	Empress of Russia; 29 January 1730 – 28 October 1740	Succeeded by Ivan VI
