= Moscow Uprising (1611) =

Civil uprising in 15th century Moscow

Moscow Uprising of 1611
- Part of Polish–Muscovite War (1605–1618)
| Location | Polish–Lithuanian occupation of Moscow |
| Result | Polish-Lithuanian victory |

Belligerents
| Polish–Lithuanian Commonwealth | (Tsardom of Russia) Muscovite Rebels (Tsardom of Russia) First People's Militia |

Commanders and leaders
| (Polish–Lithuanian Commonwealth) Aleksander Korwin Gosiewski (Polish–Lithuanian Commonwealth) Mikołaj Struś (Polish–Lithuanian Commonwealth) Aleksander Zborowski | (Tsardom of Russia) Dmitry Pozharsky (Tsardom of Russia) Prokopy Petrovich Lyapunov |

Strength
| 4,400 soldiers Thousands of peasants | 100,000-145,000 rebels and soldiers |

Casualties and losses
| Unknown, likely very few or none | Pacifications:60,000-100,000 Muscovites killed 200 Prosovetsky's Cossacks killed |

The Moscow Uprising of 1611 was an armed uprising of the inhabitants of Moscow on March 19–20, 1611 against the troops of the Polish–Lithuanian Commonwealth, who had occupied the city since the fall of 1610.

Polish soldiers behaved in Moscow as in a captured city; various incidents occurred regularly. Muscovites especially remembered the desecration of the icon on the Nikolsky Gate, at which a drunk Polish sentry shot, and the massacre in one of the markets, when the dispute over the price between the seller and the Polish soldier escalated into a mass brawl in which the Poles killed 15 Muscovites.

By March 19, 1611, the advance detachments of the people's militia, assembled near Ryazan by Prokopy Lyapunov, approached Moscow. The Polish command tried to force the cabbies in the capital to help them prepare the city for defense and to drag the cannons on their sleighs and put them on the walls. Most of them resolutely refused, and those who initially agreed, on the contrary, began to throw guns off the ramparts and walls. After that, the Poles began to kill them in the middle of the city. The metropolitan churches sounded the alarm, Muscovites took up arms.

Under the onslaught of the Poles, the rebels retreated to the White City. The advance detachments of the militia, led by Prince Pozharsky, Buturlin and Koltovsky, arrived in time to help the residents of the city. On Sretenka Pozharsky placed several cannons, under the fire of which the Poles began to retreat to Kitay–Gorod. Buturlin's detachment fought in the Yauzsky Gate, Koltovsky's detachment in Zamoskvorechye.

On March 20, the Poles counterattacked a detachment of the First Militia, which had settled on the Lubyanka. Pozharsky was seriously wounded, he was taken to the Trinity Monastery. The attempt of the Poles to secure the Zamoskvorechye, which they set on fire, failed, and they fortified themselves in Kitay–Gorod and the Kremlin.

On March 24, a detachment of Prosovetsky's Cossacks approached Moscow, but it was attacked by the Polish cavalry of Zborovsky and Strus, suffered significant losses and retreated. In the skirmish, about 200 of Prosovetsky's Cossacks were killed, after which he went over to the defensive ("sat down in the walk–cities"). Soon the main forces of the First People's Militia approached Moscow: the detachments of Lyapunov, Zarutsky and others.

Seeing no other way to defeat the enemy, the Polish troops decided to set fire to the city. The fires in Moscow continued for three days. They and the massacre staged by the Poles killed (according to various estimates) 60-100 thousand Muscovites, including 6-7 thousand civilians during the first day in Kitay-gorod alone. Those events resulted in the fall of the uprising and secured Polish rule in the city for more than another year.

== See also ==
- Battle of Moscow (1612)
- Polish–Lithuanian occupation of Moscow

== Sources ==
- Great Russian Troubles (Gift ed.). Moscow. 2007. ISBN 978-5-485-00123-0.
