= Battle of Moscow (1612) =

Battle between Russia and Poland–Lithuania

- Part of the Polish–Russian War (1609–1618)
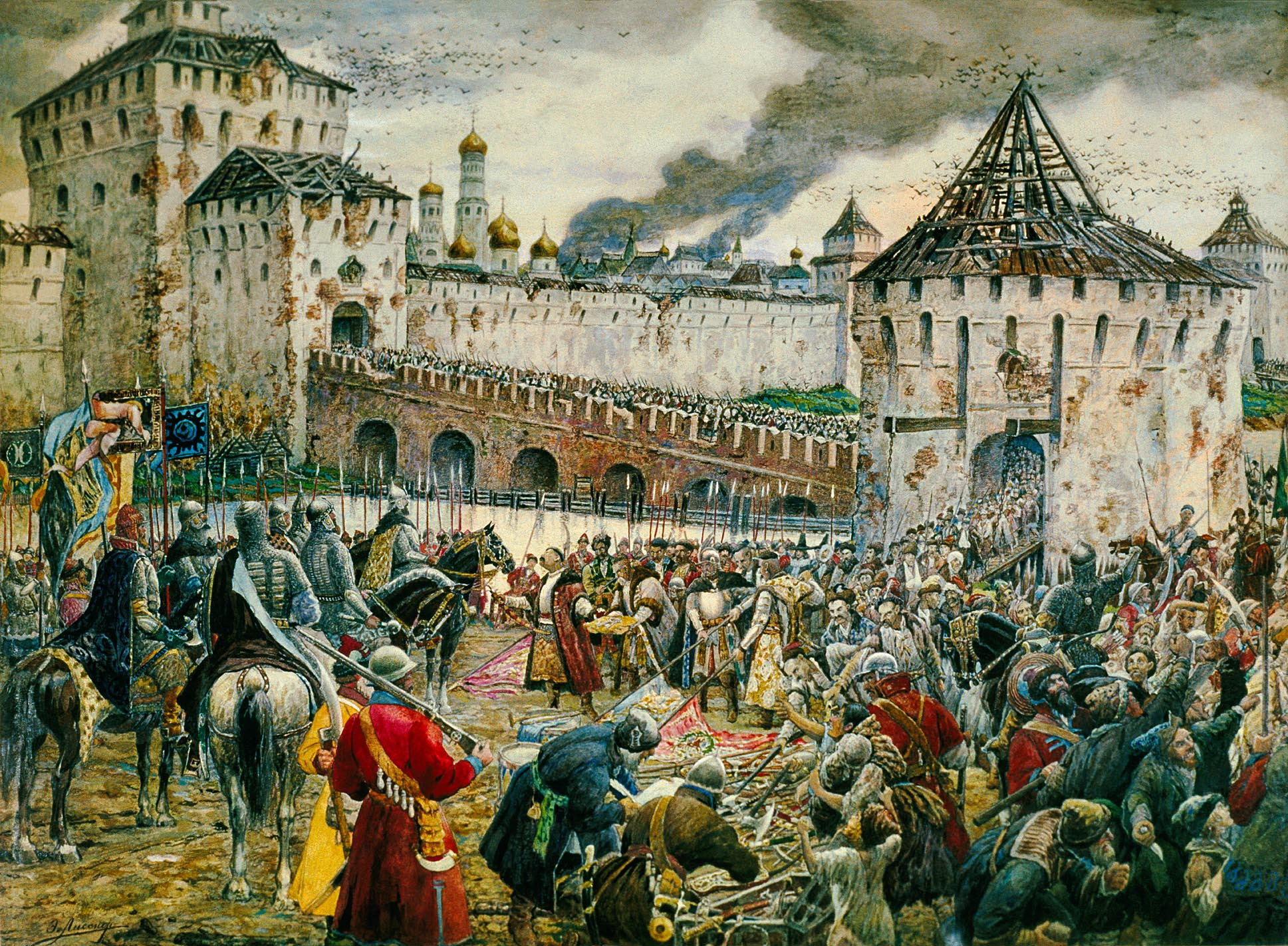
- Surrender of the Moscow Kremlin to Prince Pozharsky, painting by Ernst Lissner (1938)
Date	1 and 3 September 1612
Location	Moscow, Russia
Result	Russian victory

Belligerents
Poland–Lithuania	Russia

Commanders and leaders
Jan Karol Chodkiewicz	Dmitry Pozharsky

Strength
12,000 relief army 3,000 Moscow garrison	8,000 Russians, 2,500 Cossacks (Note: The estimates belong to G. N. Bibikov (8,000) and Pavel Lyubomirov (2,500).)

Casualties and losses
1,500	1,500

The Battle of Moscow was a series of two engagements that took place in Moscow on 1 and 3 September 1612, during the Polish–Russian War of 1609–1618 and the Time of Troubles. The forces of the Polish–Lithuanian Commonwealth were commanded by Field Hetman Jan Karol Chodkiewicz, while the Russians were led by Prince Dmitry Pozharsky. The engagements ended in decisive Russian victories.

== Prelude ==
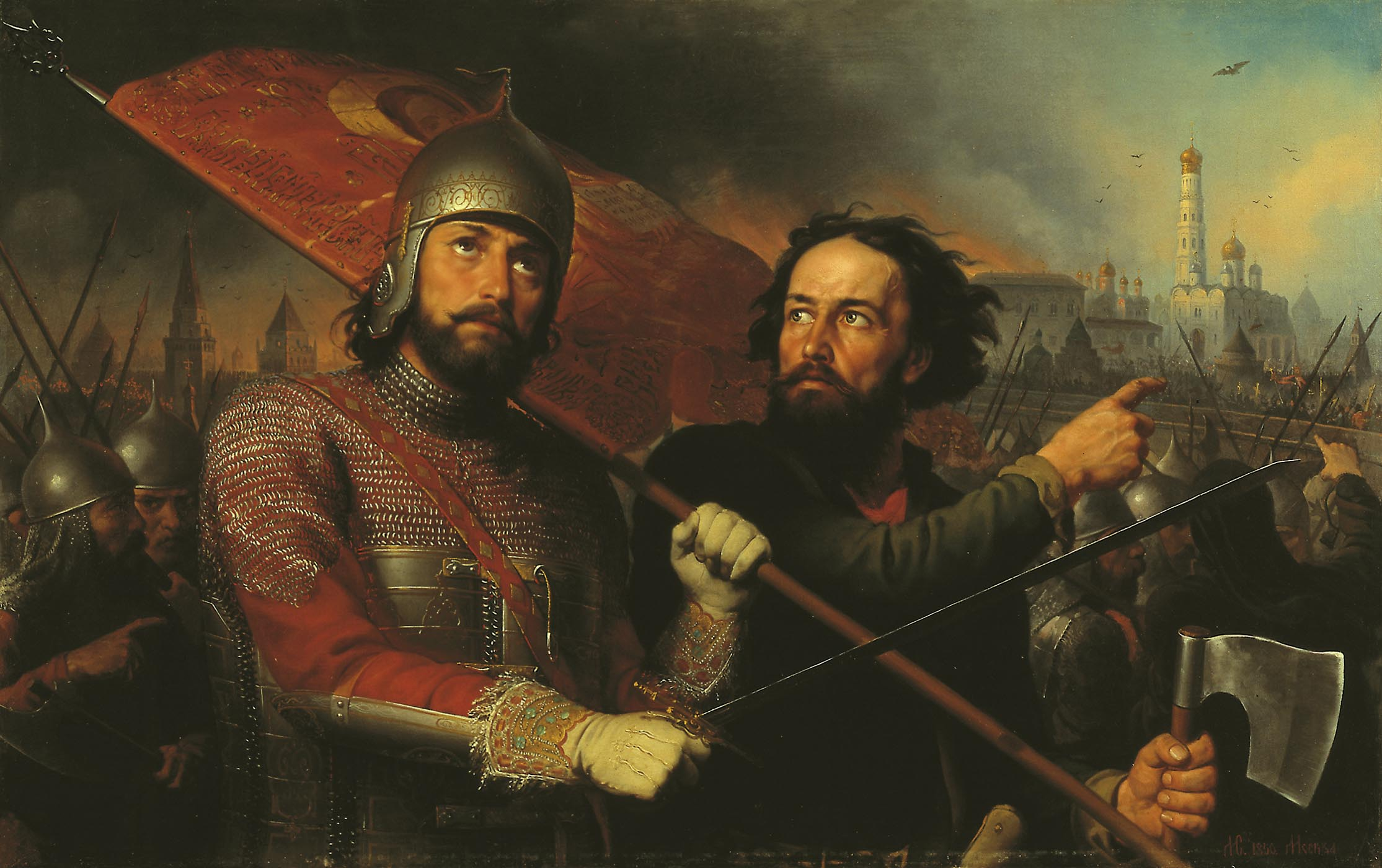
Minin (right) and Pozharsky (left) by Mikhail Scotti, 1850

After the Battle of Klushino in the summer of 1610, Tsar Vasili IV of Russia was deposed and taken to Warsaw. The Polish–Lithuanian army entered and occupied Moscow on 21 September 1610. The boyars, clergy, and citizens of Moscow, in fear of False Dmitry II, accepted the Polish prince Wladyslaw IV Vasa as their new tsar. However, this tsar was not universally accepted outside Moscow, and the country was ransacked by the Poles, mercenaries, and gangs of robbers.

In March 1611, the citizens of Moscow rebelled against the Poles, and the Polish garrison was besieged in the Kremlin by the First People's Militia led by Prokopy Lyapunov, a Ryazan-born noble. The poorly armed militia failed to take the fortress, and soon fell into disorder where Lyapunov was murdered by the Cossack leader Ivan Zarutski.

Amidst anarchy and the breakdown of the central government, the citizens of Nizhny Novgorod led by Kuzma Minin assembled the Second People's Militia, under the command of Prince Dmitry Pozharsky. Better armed and organized than the First Militia, the Second People's Militia took Yaroslavl in March 1612 and set up a provisional government, obtaining support and provisions from many cities throughout Russia, including Siberia. After receiving the news that a Polish relief army under Hetman Chodkiewicz was approaching Moscow, Minin and Pozharsky entered Moscow in August 1612 and besieged the Polish garrison in the Kremlin.

== First battle ==
On 1 September 1612, Polish–Lithuanian forces unsuccessfully tried to break the siege of the Moscow Kremlin and rescue the Commonwealth garrison under Mikołaj Struś, which was present there. To achieve this, they attacked from the west, towards the suburbs of Moscow. Polish hussars, backed by Polish, Hungarian, and German infantry, managed to break the Russian lines. However, at the same time, the right wing of the Commonwealth forces was exposed, which was immediately noticed by the Don Cossacks (allied with the Russians) of Dmitry Troubetskoy, who awaited the outcome of the battle on the other bank of the Moscow River. Part of their cavalry attacked together with forces Pozharsky sent to Trubetskoy’s aid beforehand, managing to disperse the Polish–Lithuanian forces. At the same time, the Commonwealth units in the Kremlin tried to attack the Russian positions, but also failed. On this day, both sides lost some 1,000 men.

== Second battle ==
On 3 September, Chodkiewicz decided to attack Moscow through its southern suburb, the Zamoskvorechye District. Some 600 Hungarian infantrymen managed to reach the walls of the Kremlin. They were followed by the main Commonwealth units, which were halted in the narrow streets of the district. After a Russian counterattack, Chodkiewicz ordered a retreat, losing several hundred men.

== Aftermath ==
Chodkiewicz's advance in August was met with failure, as was King Sigismund's invasion, when he was stopped in November, less than 90 kilometres (56 mi) from Moscow. According to Dunning: "On October 26, Mstislavskii... led Ivan Romanov, Mikhail Romanov, and other sheepish aristocrats out of the Kremlin. The next day, October 27, the Polish garrison surrendered unconditionally, and national militia forces entered the capital."

After the liberation of the capital, it became necessary to choose a new sovereign. In 1613, the Zemsky Sobor held a meeting in the Kremlin, and Mikhail Romanov was elected as the new tsar of all Russia, marking the end of the Time of Troubles as well as the establishment of the House of Romanov as the new ruling Russian dynasty.

== Gallery ==
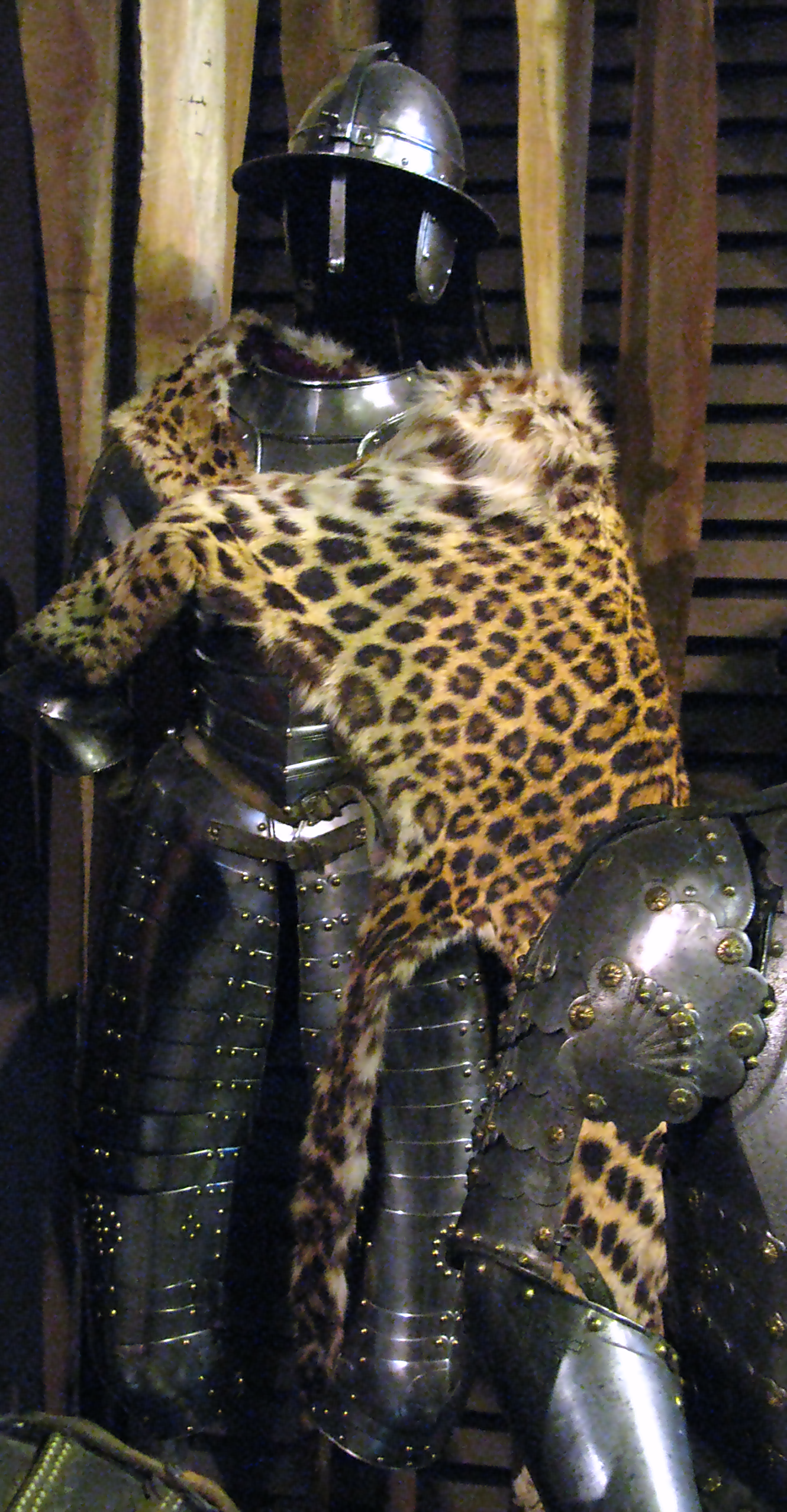
Polish cavalry armour from the 16th or 17th century

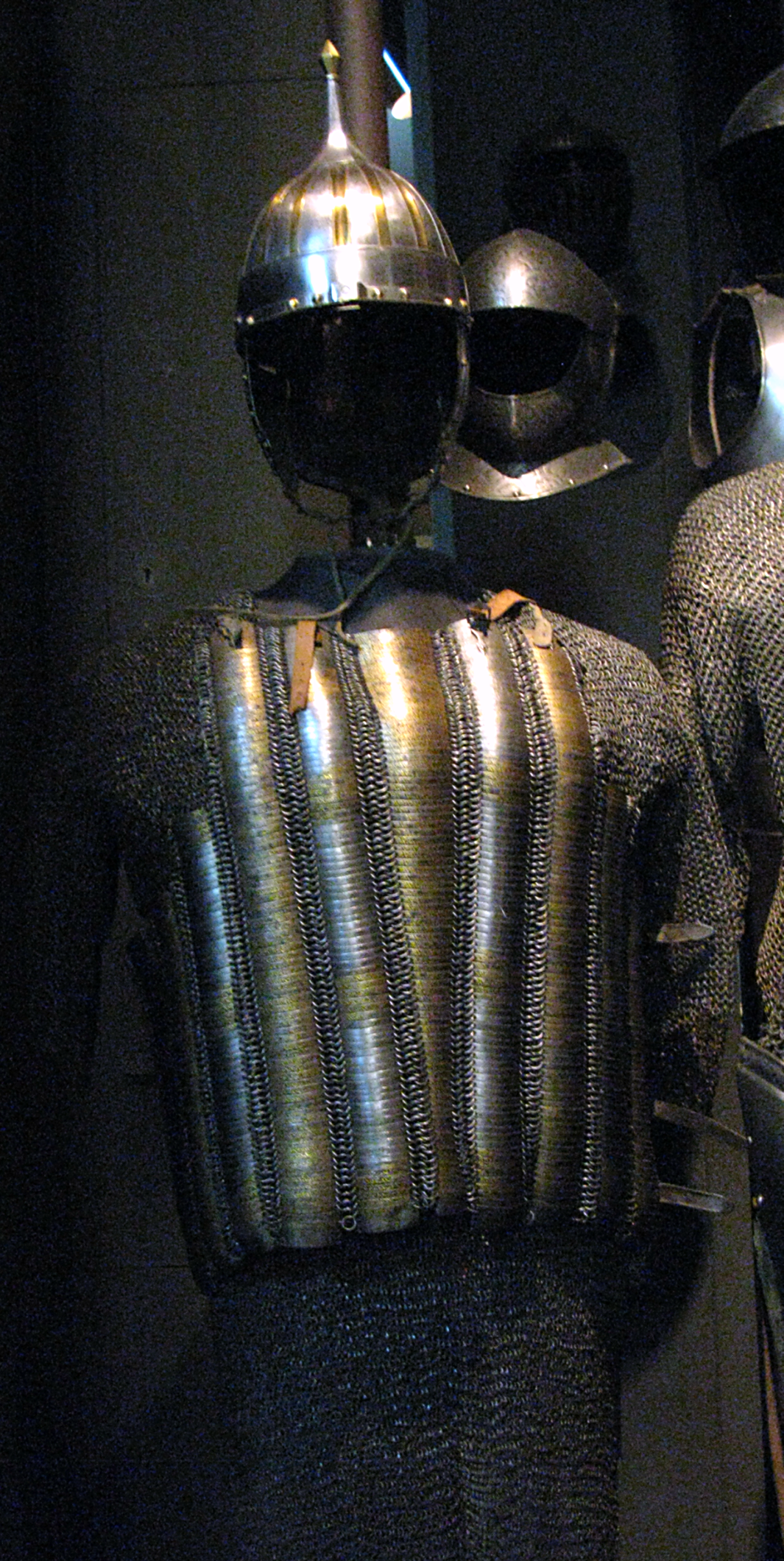
Russian behterets from the first half of the 17th century

== Sources ==
- Andrusiewicz, Andrzej (1990). Dzieje Dymitriad 1602–1614. t. I, II, Warszawa.
- Bohun, Tomasz (2005). Moskwa 1612. Wydawnictwo Bellona. ISBN 83-11-10644-4.
