= Prokopy Petrovich Lyapunov =

Russian voivode and nobleman (died 1611)

- Voivode
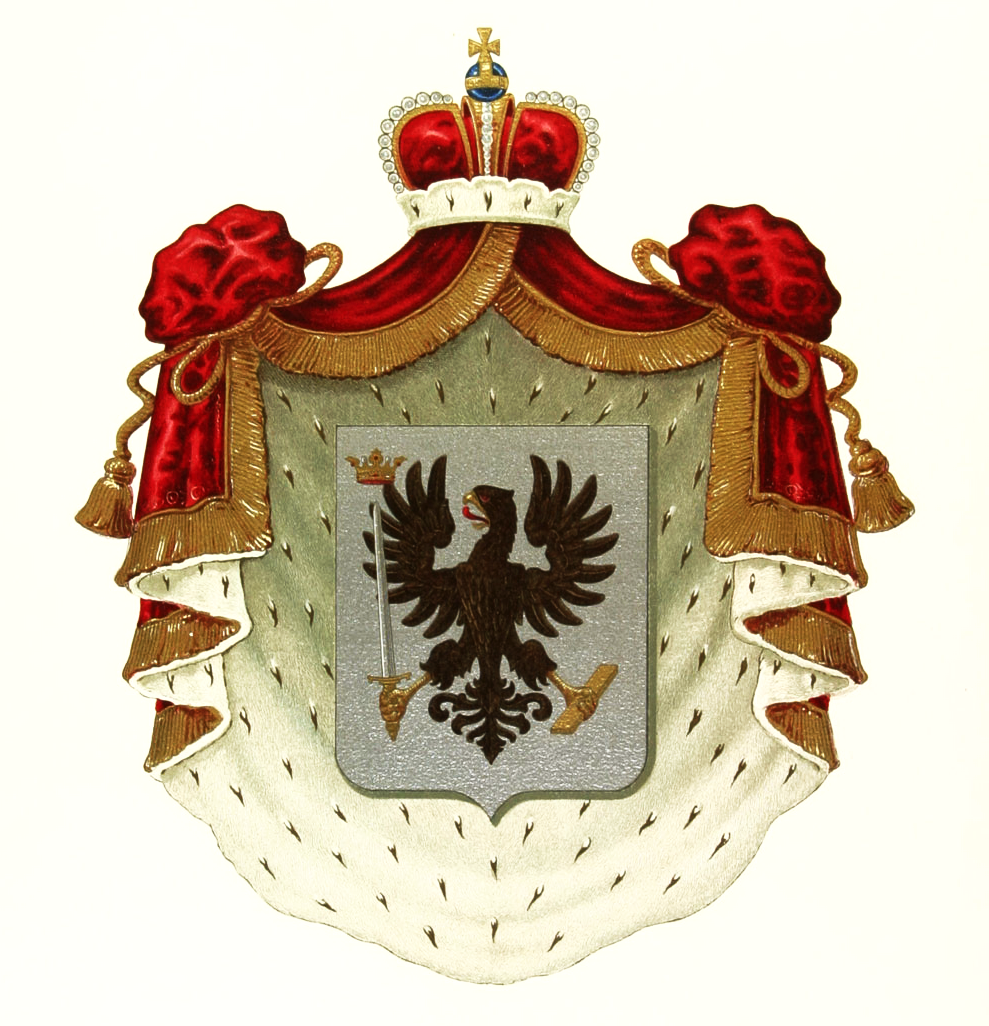
- Other titles: Dvoryanin of Duma (1607), Head of Ryazan Lands (after 1598 (Note: After death of Feodor I of Russia in 1598 he practically became a head (almost like viceroy) of Russian nobility in Ryazan lands)), Head of Zemsky Sobor (Government) of 1611
- Other names: Prokopy Lepunov
- Known for: Organization and leadership of the first People's Opolchenie against Polish-Lithuanian Commonwealth occupation of Moscow in 1611
- Born: Isady, Old Ryazan (Principality of Ryazan)
- Cause of death: Assassination
- Residence: Pereyaslavl-Ryazansky

Prokopy Petrovich Lyapunov (also Prokofy; Russian: Прокопий/Прокофий Петрович Ляпунов) (Isady, Grand Duchy of Moscow; (Note: Grand Duchy of Ryazan became a part of Grand Duchy of Moscow in 1521 and Moscow shouldn't be confused as a birth place which is located to the east of Old Ryazan, in a village that survived to this day) b. ? — July 22, 1611; (Note: Most sources agree that he died no later than August 1, 1611) Tsardom of Russia) was a prominent 17th century Russian nobleman (dvoryanin), voivode (military chieftain) of, allegedly, a Rurikid origin who practically became a head of Pereyaslavl-Ryazansky lands nobility in the end of 1590s; he took part in wars in the power vacuum during the succession crisis in early 1598 in the Tsardom, as a result of confusion over the legitimate heir apparent following the death of Feodor I, nobility infighting, war declared by the Polish–Lithuanian Commonwealth (PLC) in 1605, and exhaustive Tatar raids. Most famously he is remembered for organizing and leading the first unsuccessful uprising against the occupation of Moscow of 1610 by the PLC in April of 1611.

In 1583-1584 he successfully participated in exiling of Bogdan Belsky, a close associate of Ivan the Terrible who was blamed for treason. During Time of Troubles (1598) Prokopy Lyapunov and his brother Zakhary Lyapunov sided with False Dmitry I who (upon being uncovered as a false Czar) was killed in a plot by Vasili IV Shuisky (Tsar) and his associates. Prokopy Petrovich along with his ally Pashkov Fillip Ivanovich initially revolted against Vasilii IV in controversial Peasants' Uprising (a.k.a. Uprising of Ivan Bolotnikov) of 1606 which failed to topple Vasili IV but which, however, drew both parties (Lyapunov and Pashkov) on the latter's side by the end of 1606 (or 1607). In 1607 Along with Tsar's forces he besieged Tula where Ivan Bolotnikov was hiding. In 1610 plot he helped Moscovite's nobility, known as Seven Boyars, and his brother Zakhary Lyapunov to depose Vasili IV for a latter brother's failure at Battle of Klushino, a battle with Polish hussars and mercenaries.

In April of 1611 Prokopy along with his strongmen, Duke Dmitry Troubetskoy, and Cossacks Ataman Ivan Zarutsky led the First People's Opolcheniye (FPO) in an attempt to expel Polish forces from occupied Moscow, dying not long after that.

== Biography ==
He was born on an unknown date in the village of Isady (Russian: Исады) to the East of Old Ryazan. Little is known about his life before 1584.

== Time of Troubles ==
=== During Feodor I of Russia ===
Until 1590 Prokopy served as voivode under viceroy of Pereyaslavl-Ryazansky Dmitry I. Khvorostin until latter's death in 1590. In 1598 he was allegedly a head of Ryazan Zemsky Sobor embassy sent to Moscow to elect new Czar when Feodor I of Russia died with no heirs left. His signature is found on the final decision made by Moscow Zemsky Sobor in favor of Boris Godunov.

=== Servant of Boris Godunov ===
In 1603-1603 Prokopy served as Mayor of now lost city Tsarev-Borisov. In 1603 along with Ivan Andreyevich Khovansky, Prokopy attempted to retake Zaraysk occupied at the time by mercenaries of Aleksander Józef Lisowski. After Battle of Dobrynichi in 1605 under leadership of Fedor Sheremetev, Prokopy with his son Vladimir were sent to Kromy as voivide (not far from Orel, where Lisowczyks were expected) to ward off Polish and Zaporozh Cossack forces.

=== Servant of False Dmitry I ===
After the death of Boris Godunov in 1605, Prokopy along with his brother Zakhary Lyapunov, Petr Basmanov, and Vasily Golitsyn switched their side to the False Dmitriy I after falsely believing that the latter was son of Ivan IV, Dmitry of Uglich who "managed to flee to Poland instead of dying" (and thus being the only legitimate heir to the Czar throne).

In October 1606 he and hist strongmen rebelled against ruling Tsar Vasili IV in the Bolotnikov Uprising. In November 1606, however Lyapunov came to Moscow and gave himself up to Vasili IV for which the latter granted him with a Dvoryanin of Boyar Duma (likely c. 1607) title. In 1607 supported Tsar's troops in besieging Tula where leaders of uprising, including Ivan Bolotnikov, took a refugee, and confronted rebels in neighboring towns.

=== Occupation of Moscow of 1611 ===
During February-March, 1608, Lyapunov led an army of Ryazan, Arzamas, and Muscow voivodes against peasants who rose in revolt in Pronsk against Vasili IV Shuisky (which was allegedly instigated by Aleksander Józef Lisowski and his ragtag mercenaries and supporters of False Dmitriy II)

In late spring Prokopy L., with his brother Zakhary P. L., and Viceroy of Ryazan Ivan Andreyevich Khovansky unsuccessfully besieged Pronsk (at the time occupied by mercenaries of Lisowski) in the Battle of Zaraisk 1608.; Prokopy sustained leg wound by a musket at hands of Lisowski's Don Cossacks and temporarily handed military duties to his brother Zakhary.

In May 1609 Prokopy was sent by Czar Vasilii IV to Kolomna to relieve siege imposed by troops loyal to False Dmitry II and Lisowski.

In July 1610, Lyapunov along with his brother Zakhary P. L. overthrew and exiled Vasili IV after sudden and suspicious death of Mikhail Skopin-Shuisky (a prominent military figure) reportedly blamed on Vasili IV. In September 1610 Moscow Boyars (so called Seven Boyars), invited Władysław IV Vasa, son of Sigismund III Vasa to "on the rule" i.e. to become a Czar of all Russia. Under pressure of Patriarch Germogen they conditioned that he accepts Orthodox faith but he ultimately refused to appear. In late 1610 Prokopy set off to retake Pronsk (again) in the name of Władysław IV to whom he just pledged his allegiance; Dmitry Pozharsky came to a help from Zaraisk (where he served as a voivode) and they together left for Pereyaslavl Ryazansky. At the same time news came from Moscow: poles and Seven Boyars jailed Patriarch Germogen for refusing to recognize Władysław IV; in response, by the end of 1610, Prokopy demanded to free Patriarch but was ignored; as result of failure by Sigismund III to deliver his son, poles occupation of Moscow and another succession crisis he pushed hard on summoning new Zemsky Sobor to create FPO to put an end to the Polish occupation, power- and lawlessness.

=== First people's Opolchenie ===
When the Polish army occupied Moscow in 1611, Lyapunov, responding to Patriarch Germogen's proclamations to stand up for "Holy Rus' and Holy [orthodox] faith", started to spread calls to different cities for "uprising" that finally levied the First People's Opolchenie (first authorized by Zemsky Sobor at the time) and became its leader. In March 1611, his ragtag army consisting of Cossacks (previously served under False Dmitry I and his Poland superiors) approached Moscow with 12 thousands-strong army (having no heavy weaponry however) from the south and blocked the invaders from giving a rise to Moscow Uprising of 1611. In June his peace talks with Jan Piotr Sapieha, who threatened his south flanks at the Moscow's south border, have failed.

In the summer of 1611, Prokopy Lyapunov practically became the head of so called «Council of all lands» (Russian: Совет всей земли), an interim government, called to establish an order and as result of which, on June 30, he issued a decree that reinstated certain serf regulations and violated his own promises to Cossacks of "freedom and salary" (as they tended to plunder surroundings where they stayed); by another one Prokopy L. also imposed harsh punishment on looters to prevent unauthorized collection of taxes and duties; this contributed to further disintegration of his movement.

At this point, however, brief success didn't last long as internal and deeply irreconcilable differences between Russian nobles, bureaucracy, and Cossacks (that constituted FPO) started to brew. The disagreement was seriously aggravated when 28 Cossacks caught for looting of Ugresha Monastery were sentenced to death (or, by some other accounts - drowned) by one of loyal to Prokopy voivode, becoming the last straw that broke FPO ranks and sealed Prokopy's fate.

== Death ==
A decree made up either by Aleksander K. Gosiewski (who at the time occupied Moscow Kremlin and was threatened by FPO troops) or Ivan Zarutsky (Cossacks faction of FPO) (Note: Exact details differ from author to author; reportedly some chronicles biased toward more sensational description of events by omitting some details.) (delivered by one of captive cossack to the indignant Cossacks headquarters) declared Cossacks as outlaws. Because the decree was closely resembling hand of Prokopy Lyapunov he was invited to Cossacks "circle" (council) on outskirts of Moscow for interrogation; soon after that, however, Cossacks assaulted and stubbed him to death on July 22 (no later August 1), 1611.

=== Burial ===
Body of Prokopy Lyapunov was reportedly buried at Temple of Prophet Elijah on Vorontsov Field, but at some point later reburied at Trinity Lavra of St. Sergius by his son Vladimir, along with many other prominent figures who lived at the Time of Troubles (e.g. Dmitry Troubetskoy).

== Aftermath ==
Some remains of FPO, primarily Cosscaks loyal to ataman Ivan Zarutsky continued to fight with Poles, but some have joined Dmitry Pozharsky troops at Yaroslavl to form Second People's Opolcheniye preparing for the Battle of Moscow (1612).

== Personal life ==
=== Family ===
Prokopy belonged to a noble family dynasty called Lyapunov.

=== Children ===
- Vladimir Prokopievich Lyapunov, it's known that he has donated a cross to the church of the Isady Village where his father Prokopy was born; it's currently kept in Ryazan Kremlin

== See also ==
- Mikhail Skopin-Shuysky

== In culture ==
- «The Death of Lyapunov» (1816 or 1818–1878), a patriotic drama by Stepan Gedeonov.
- «Prince Skopin-Shuisky» (1834-1835, Russian Empire), a drama by Nestor Kukolnik - Prokopy Lyapunov depicted avenging death of his ally Skopin-Shuysky.
