= Ivan Andreyevich Khovansky =

Prince Ivan Andreyevich Khovansky (Russian: Иван Андреевич Хованский) (died 1621) was a Russian boyar, voivode of Novgorod, and viceroy of Ryazan of Lithuanian Gediminid origin.

During the Time of Troubles, he participated in the struggle against the supporters of False Dmitry II and Polish invaders. In 1607, Khovansky was sent to Mikhailov, which had been occupied by the opponents of Vasili IV of Russia, but his attacks on this city were rebuffed. In 1608, he and Prokopy Lyapunov fought against the Polish army in the Ryazan region, but was defeated by Aleksander Józef Lisowski at Zaraysk. In 1610, Khovansky fought alongside Prince Mikhail Skopin-Shuisky, who ordered him to combine forces with the Swedish army, occupy the southern part of the Tver region, and prevent the enemy from regrouping. Khovansky managed to rendezvous with the Swedes near Staritsa, capture Rzhev, and beset Bely. Hetman Stanisław Żółkiewski was dispatched to aid the Polish army, but Khovansky avoided the collision and moved towards Mozhaysk in order to combine forces with Dmitry Shuisky.

Khovansky took part in the Battle of Klushino, where Shuisky suffered a severe defeat from Hetman Żółkiewski. When Dmitry Pozharsky and Kuzma Minin organized a volunteer army to save Moscow from the Polish invaders, Khovansky took part in this army's campaign against the enemy. Together with Minin, he commanded this army during its march from Yaroslavl to Rostov, while Pozharsky was in Suzdal.

In 1613−1614, Khovansky was appointed Voyevoda in Yaroslavl. In Spring 1615, he was granted the title of boyar and sent to the outskirts of Smolensk to command the inactive Russian army. Khovansky did not take part in military action due to the beginning of peace talks. When the negotiations were interrupted, Khovansky was put in charge of a unit (approx. 5,000 men), which had been fighting the Lithuanians in the Siversk region. In 1616–1617, he was appointed head of the Judicial Prikaz in Vladimir and then Voyevoda of Novgorod (from June 1617 to 1619).
