= Occupation of Moscow =

Occupation of Moscow may refer to:

- Polish–Lithuanian occupation of Moscow (1610–1612)
- French occupation of Moscow (1812)
