= Strus =

Strus or Struś is a surname. It may refer to:

- Lusia Strus (born 1969), American writer and actress
- Józef Struś or Josephus Struthius (1510–1568), Polish professor of medicine
- Max Strus (born 1996), American basketball player
- Mikołaj Struś (1577–1627), Polish starosta
