= Polish–Lithuanian occupation of Moscow =

1610–12 event during Russia's Time of Troubles

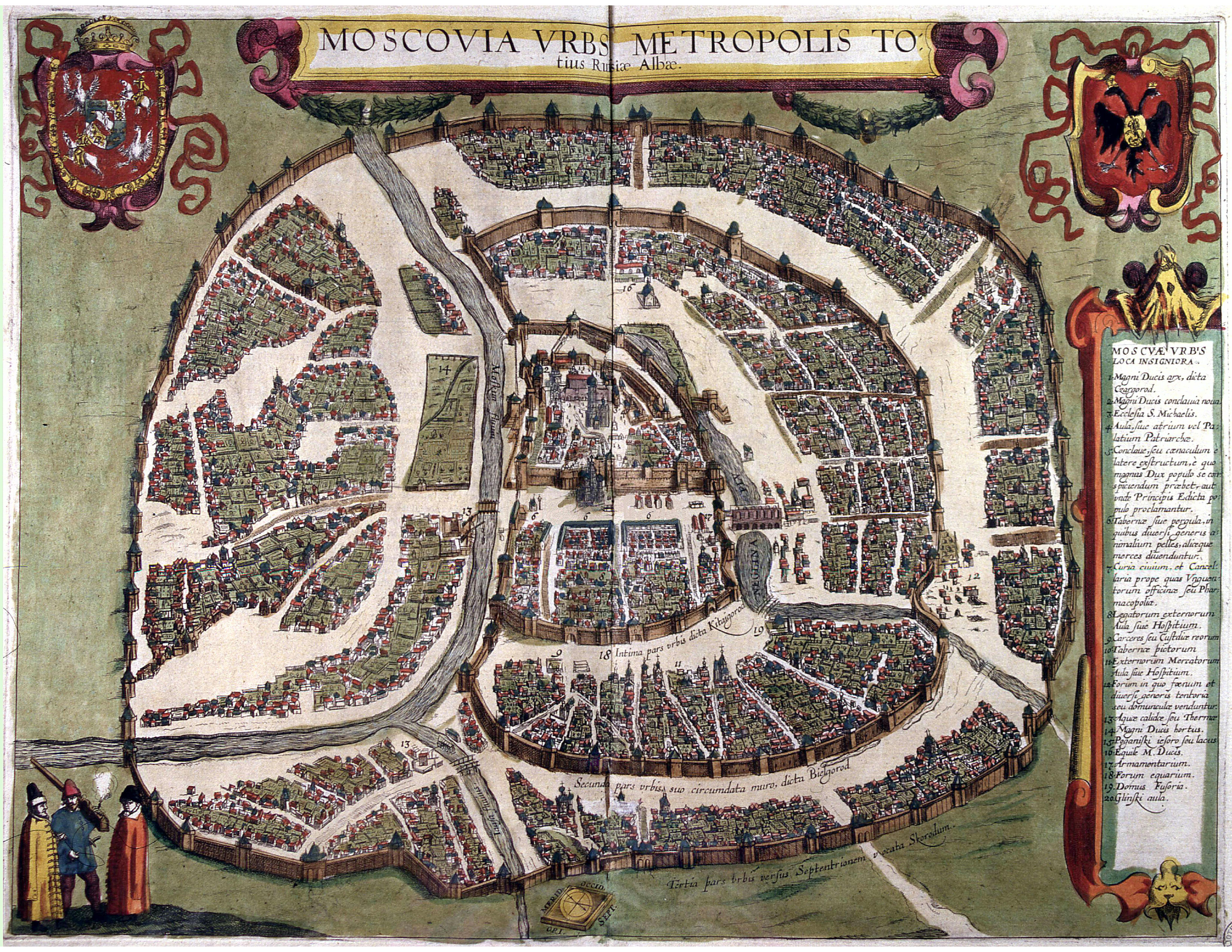
Sigismund's drawing of Moscow, made by the Poles, engraved in 1610. The latest plan for Moscow, drawn up before the destruction of 1612. The plan is rotated 90 degrees: north – right, top – west

The Polish-Lithuanian Commonwealth occupation of Moscow took place between 1610 and 1612 during the Polish-Lithuanian intervention in Russia, when the Kremlin was occupied by the Polish garrison with additional Lithuanian units under the command of hetman Stanisław Żółkiewski and assisted by Russian boyars led by Mikhail Saltykov. The occupation coincided with Russia's Time of Troubles.

From March 1611 to the autumn of 1612, the Cossacks of Prince Dmitry Trubetskoy besieged Moscow and the Polish-Lithuanian forces there. The city was finally liberated by the Second People's Militia, and the date of the capture of Kitay-Gorod is celebrated in modern Russia as the Day of National Unity on November 4, alongside festivities in honour of Our Lady of Kazan.

== Żółkiewski in Moscow ==
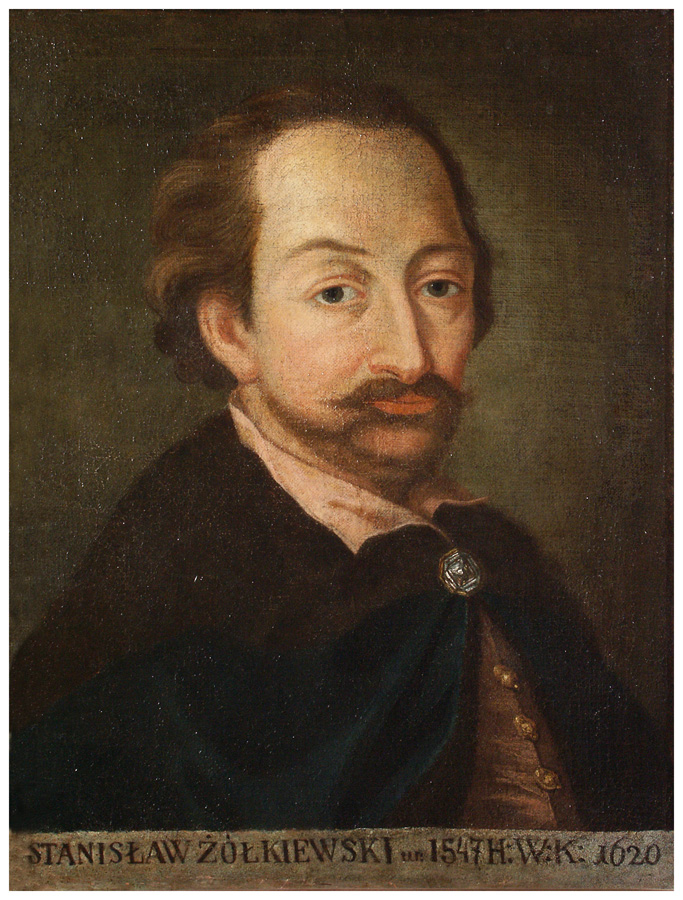
Stanisław Żółkiewski

In October–November 1610, after tsarist troops were defeated at Klushino and the Seven Boyars agreed to elevate Polish prince Władysław IV Vasa to the Russian throne so as to maintain order in the capital until the arrival of a new head of state, the Commonwealth troops of Stanisław Żółkiewski entered Moscow without a fight. Żółkiewski camped on the Khoroshyovsky Meadows and Khodynka Field. Although he personally opposed the occupation of the Russian capital, he entered the city under the pressure of Polish king Sigismund III.

At the end of 1610, about 6,000 armored and cavalry soldiers, 800 infantrymen, and 400 hajduks were stationed at Moscow and Novodevichy Convent, led by Aleksander Korwin Gosiewski, Marcin Kazanowski, Aleksander Zborowski and Ludwik Wejher. For every soldier, there were three civilians who had joined them on the way to Moscow acting as servants, sutlers and prostitutes.

Żółkiewski placed the soldiers in Moscow so that in the event of an attack they could come to each other's aid or retreat to the Kremlin. A significant part of the garrison was located west of the Kremlin wall near the Neglinnaya River. To maintain order, a tribunal was established in which the Russian side was represented by Grigory Romodanovsky and Ivan Streshnev, and the Polish–Lithuanian Commonwealth side by Aleksander Koryciński and a Lieutenant (Porucznik) Maliński.

When Żółkiewski went to Smolensk in November for a meeting with Sigismund III, he took his regiments with him. Several units were left at the Novodevichy Convent to control the roads to Mozhaysk and Volokolamsk. The rest were staged closer to the besieged Smolensk, in Vereya and Mozhaysk.

== Siege of Moscow by the Cossacks ==
In March 1611, in connection with the formation of the First People's Militia, the commander of the Polish-Lithuanian garrison, Aleksander Gosiewski, engaged in several street battles during which most of Moscow was burned. Having broken the townspeople's resistance in advance, Gosiewski hoped to minimize support for the First Militia.

In April and early May of that year, the militias stormed the ramparts of Zemlyanoy City and the walls of the White City, liberating most of the territory of Moscow, after which they locked the invaders behind the Kitay-Gorod and Kremlin Walls. The Cossacks of Prince Dmitry Trubetskoy laid siege to the Kremlin garrison itself, which was manned by Poles. Also inside the walls were members of the Semiboyarshchina, including the future Tsar Mikhail Fedorovich Romanov and his mother.

== Hunger and cannibalism ==
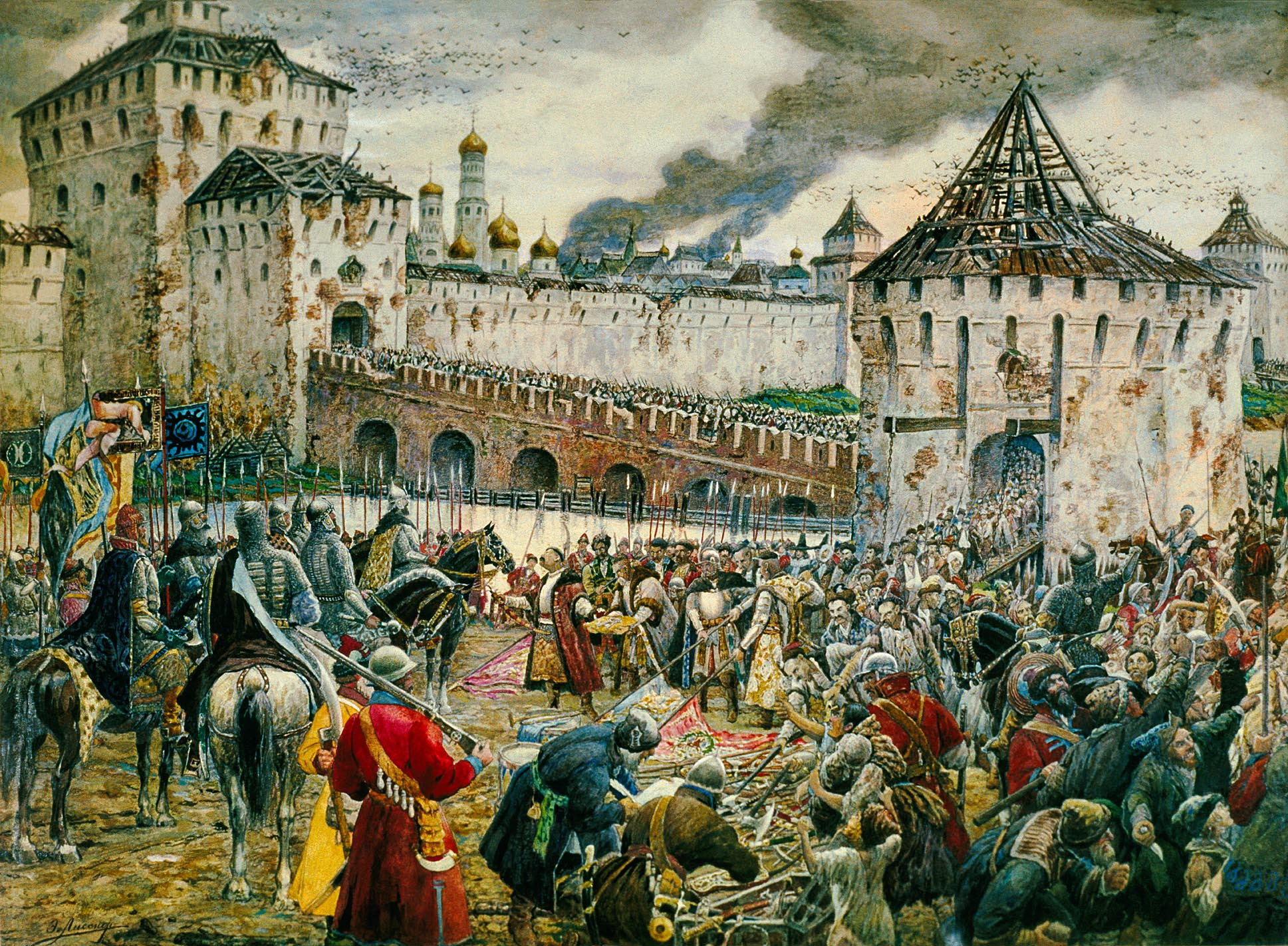
Expulsion of the Polish–Lithuanian invaders from the Kremlin

Provisions for the garrison were collected in the Moscow region by the regiment of Jan Piotr Sapieha. According to the testimony of the memoirist Samuel Maskiewicz, "what anyone liked, and whether the greatest boyar's wife or daughter, they took them by force." After the death of Sapieha in September 1611, Lithuanian commander Jan Karol Chodkiewicz took over the difficult task of collecting food.

At the end of 1611, carts with provisions collected by Samuel Korecki reached the Kremlin. In January 1612, a regiment was able to break through to Moscow, which temporarily eased the food situation. However, the Hungarian infantrymen of Felix Nevyarovsky did not bring their provisions, and their presence only accelerated the return food scarcity.

The entire first half of 1612 was unusually cold, and many of the garrison's soldiers formed a confederation and abandoned the Russian capital. Famine began in the city; speculators sold bread at 30 times its regular price.

Russian historian Avraamy Palitsyn claims that after they entered into the Kremlin, Dmitry Troubetskoy's Cossacks discovered salted human flesh, "and under the slings, there is a lot of human corpse," suggesting that the garrison resorted to cannibalism when food supplies ran out.

== Autumn 1612 ==
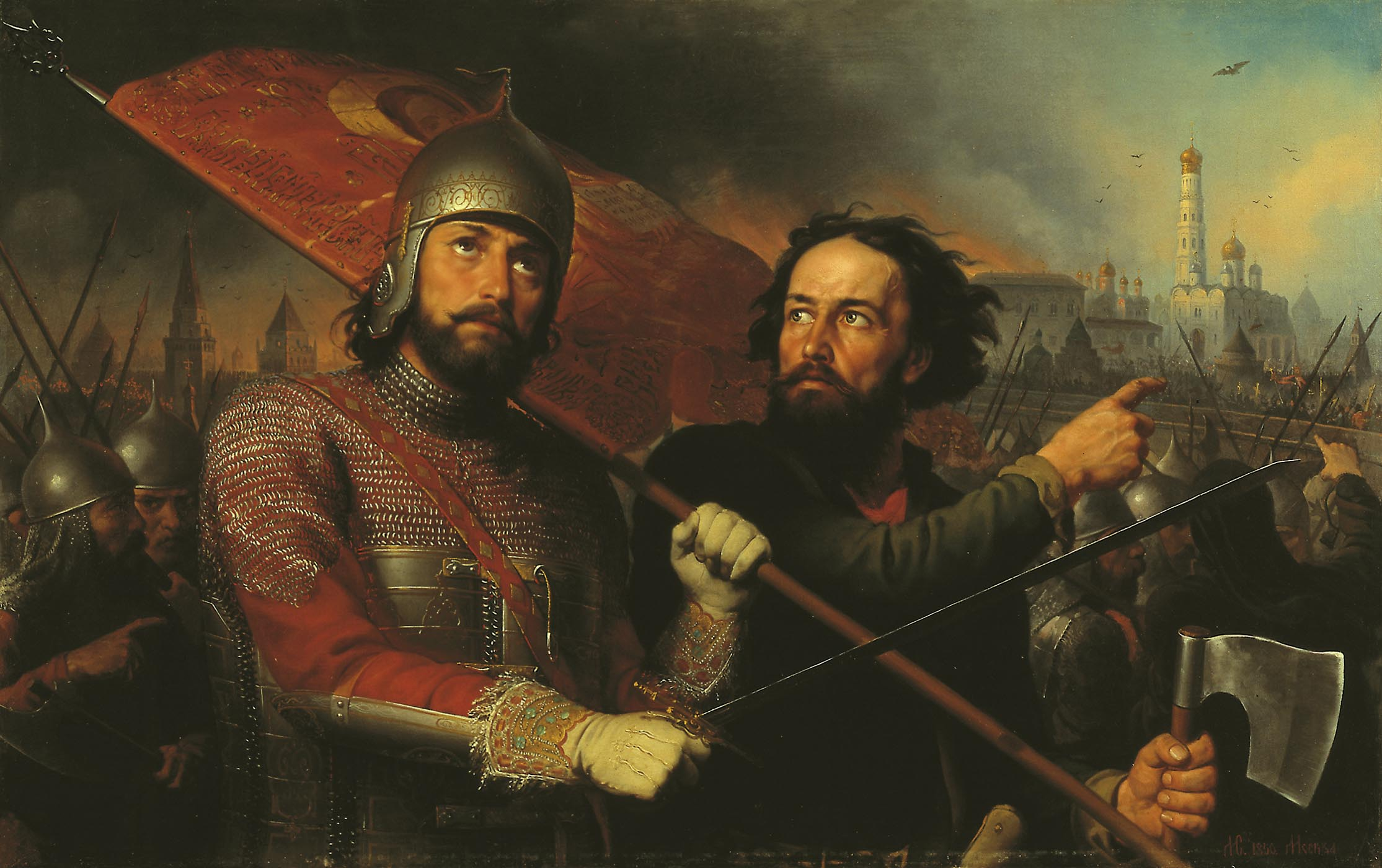
Minin and Pozharsky in Moscow. Painting by Mikhail Scotti (1850)

Throughout 1612, Polish-Lithuanian formations began to leave Moscow. Commander Gosiewski left in June, along with the veterans of the Klushino Battle and the remnants of the Kremlin's treasury. Mikołaj Struś commanded what remained of the garrison. The garrison itself was almost resupplied during the Battle of Moscow in September, but forces with some 400 carts of provisions were forced to retreat after getting within two kilometers of the Kremlin.

Trubetskoy's Cossacks established control of Kitay-Gorod at the beginning of November, after which Struś opened negotiations on terms of surrender. The Kremlin garrison formally capitulated on November 7. Although Trubetskoy promised to "leave the defeated in health and have respect," they were massacred instead: "The Cossacks beat the whole regiment, leaving a few."

== Fate of the prisoners ==
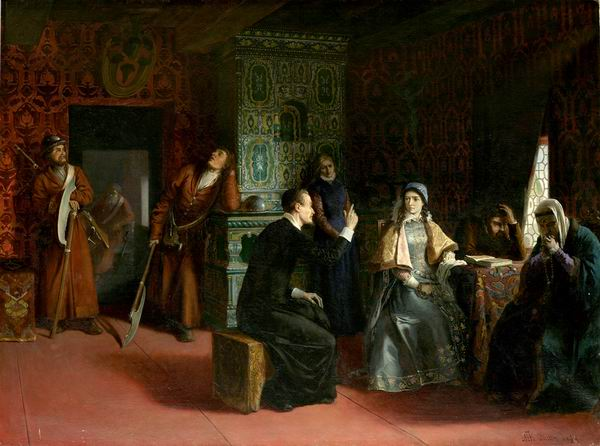
Poles in Russian captivity

Before the Truce of Deulino was signed in 1619, which ended the Russian-Polish War and fostered an exchange of prisoners, the Poles and Lithuanians captured in the Kremlin were settled in Yaroslavl, Balakhna, Nizhny Novgorod and other Upper Volga cities. In Nizhny Novgorod, the mother of Prince Pozharsky put in her word for the prisoners, so they only were thrown "in a dungeon very dark, poor and stinking, in which they had been sitting for nineteen weeks". The prisoners held in Galich and along the river Unzha were completely exterminated.

== See also ==
- Occupation of Moscow by the French

== Sources ==
- Boris Florea. Polish-Lithuanian Intervention in Russia and Russian Society / Boris Florea; Russian Academy of Sciences, Institute of Slavic Studies – Moscow: Indrik, 2005 (Production and Printing Enterprise Printing House Nauka) – 415 Pages – ISBN 5-85759-303-4
