= Dmitry Pozharsky =

Russian prince (1577–1642)

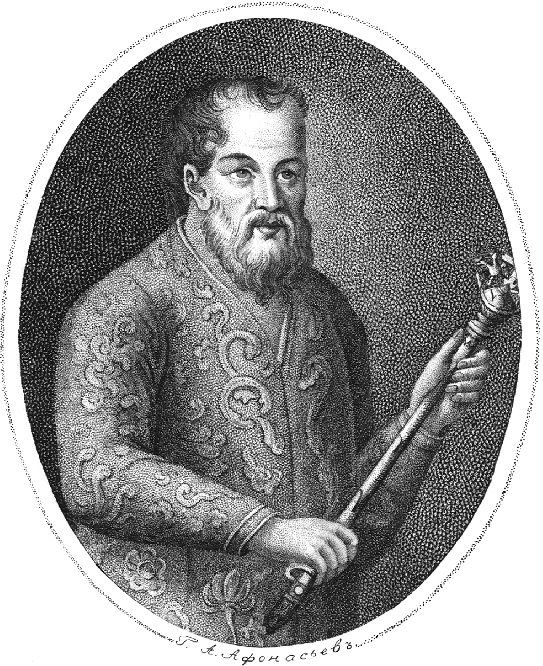
- Portrait of Pozharsky, found by Pyotr Beketov and placed in his collection. Engraving by masters Nikolai Sokolov and Alexander Afanasyev from the "Collection of Portraits of Russians...", made from an original portrait of the 17th century
- Born: Dmitry (Kuzma) Pozharsky; 1 November 1578; Klin County, Moscow Governorate, Tsardom of Russia
- Died: 20 April 1642 (aged 63); Moscow, Tsardom of Russia
- Military career
- Allegiance: Russia
- Branch: Militia
- Service years: 1608–1642
- Rank: Head of the Second People's Militia
- Conflicts: Polish-Russian War; Battle of Moscow; Siege of Kaluga

Dmitry Mikhaylovich Pozharsky (Russian: Дмитрий Михайлович Пожарский, IPA: [ˈdmʲitrʲɪj mʲɪˈxajləvʲɪtɕ pɐˈʐarskʲɪj]; 17 October 1577 – 30 April 1642) was a Russian prince known for his military leadership during the Polish–Russian War from 1611 to 1612. Pozharsky formed the Second Volunteer Army with Kuzma Minin in Nizhny Novgorod against the Polish–Lithuanian Commonwealth's occupation of Russia during the Time of Troubles, resulting in Polish withdrawal after Russian victory at the Battle of Moscow in 1612. Pozharsky received the unprecedented title of Saviour of the Fatherland from Mikhail I of Russia, becoming a folk hero in Russian culture and honored in the Monument to Minin and Pozharsky in Moscow's Red Square.

== Early career ==
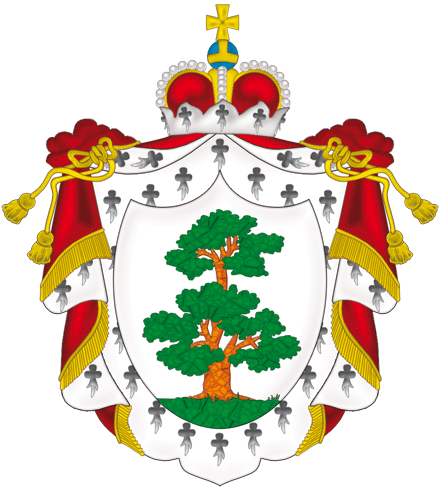
Coat of arms of the Princes Pozharsky

Dmitry Mikhaylovich Pozharsky is considered to have been born on 1 November 1578 in Klin County, in the north of Moscow Governorate of the Tsardom of Russia. In keeping with the custom of many Russian noble families between the fifteenth and seventeenth centuries, he bore two Christian names: a baptismal name (Kuz'ma, after Saints Cosmas and Damian, on whose feast day he was born), used exclusively in religious contexts, and a public name (Dmitry), by which he was generally known. Pozharsky was descended from a branch of Rurik dynasty, sovereign princes which ruled the town of Starodub-on-the-Klyazma, near Suzdal 190 kilometers (120 mi) northeast of Moscow. At one point in the 15th century the family estate burned to the ground, and in consequence assumed the name of Pozharsky, derived from the Russian word pozhar meaning conflagration. Pozharsky's mother, Maria Feodorovna Pozharskaya, came from the Beklemishev family.

Pozharsky's early career was not documented until the beginning of the Time of Troubles following the death of Tsar Feodor I in 1598, when he took part in the Zemsky Sobor which elected Boris Godunov as the Tsar of Russia. Pozharsky's closeness to the throne during Godunov's rule made him an influential figure among Russia's nobility. Pozharsky was attested as a stolnik four years later and supported the Tsardom in the Polish-Muscovite War following its outbreak in 1605. Pozharsky was present at the defense of Kolomna in 1608 and helped Vasily IV during the siege of Moscow in 1609. Later that year, Pozharsky routed the rebellious Cossacks of Ivan Bolotnikov at the Pekhorka River. In 1610, Pozharsky was in command at the defense of Zaraysk against the forces of False Dmitry II.

== Struggle for independence ==
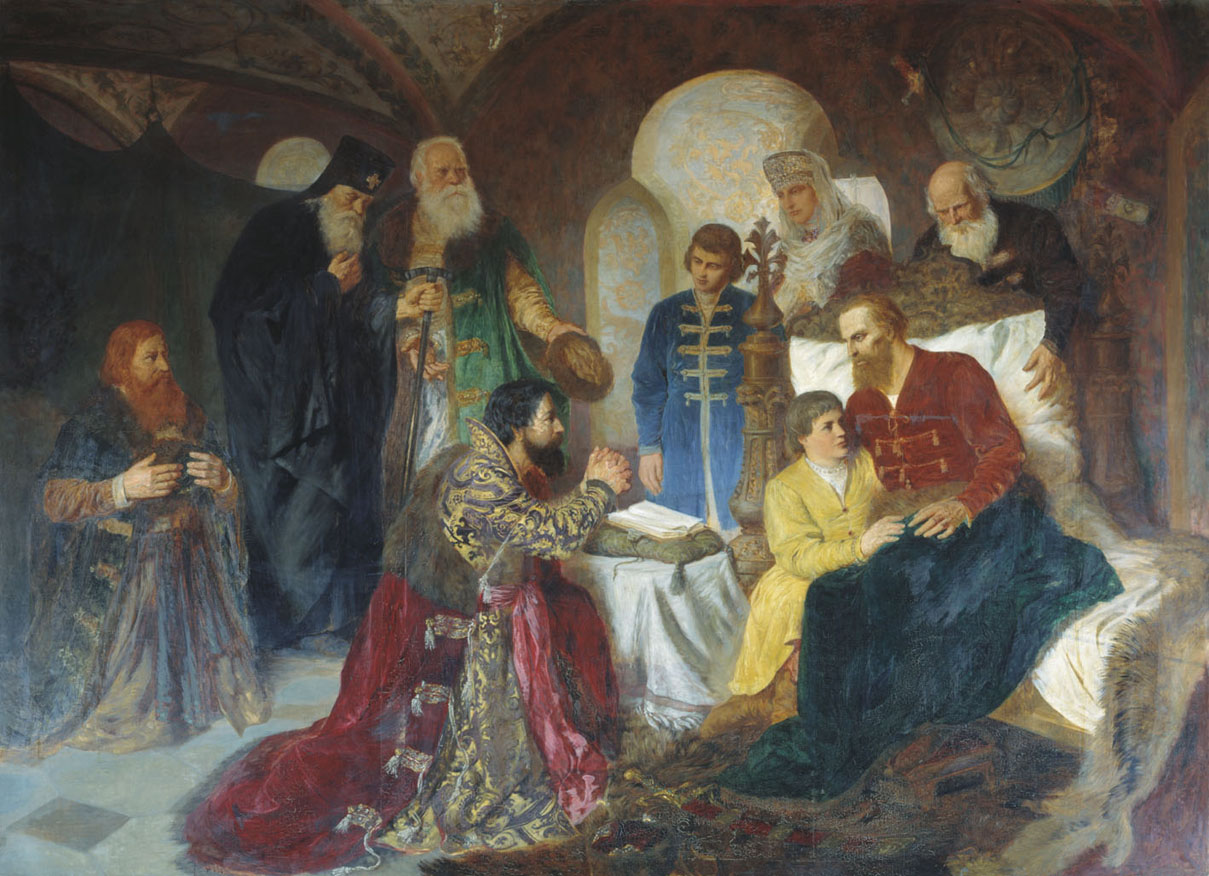
Pozharsky and the delegation from Moscow. Painting by Wilhelm Kotarbiński (1882).

By this time, Russian popular indignation against the Polish–Lithuanian Commonwealth's occupation had gained momentum due to the abuses and criminal behavior of the Polish army, and the loss of support among the pro-Polish faction of Russia's boyar class due to the actions of King Sigismund III. After Prokopy Lyapunov rallied the First Volunteer Army in Ryazan, Pozharsky promptly joined the cause and took a prominent part in the uprising in Moscow. Pozharsky was wounded on 19 March 1611 while defending his house at Lubyanka Square and was transported by his adherents to the Trinity Lavra of St. Sergius for convalescence.

In autumn 1611, when Pozharsky was recuperating at his Puretsky patrimony near Suzdal, he was approached by a delegation who offered him command of the Second Volunteer Army then gathered in Nizhny Novgorod to oust the Polish occupiers. Pozharsky agreed on condition that he would be assisted by Kuzma Minin, a representative of the merchants of Nizhny Novgorod that was instrumental in the army's founding. Although the volunteer corps aimed at clearing the Polish invaders out of Moscow, Pozharsky and his contingent marched towards Yaroslavl first. There they resided for half a year, vacillating until the opportunity for rapid action was gone. A man of devout disposition, Pozharsky fervently prayed before Our Lady of Kazan, one of the holiest Russian icons, prior to advancing towards Moscow. Yet even then he proceeded so slowly and timorously, performing religious ceremonies in Rostov and paying homage to ancestral graves in Suzdal, that it took him several months to reach the Trinity, whose authorities ineffectually sought to accelerate the progress of his forces.

=== Battle of Moscow ===
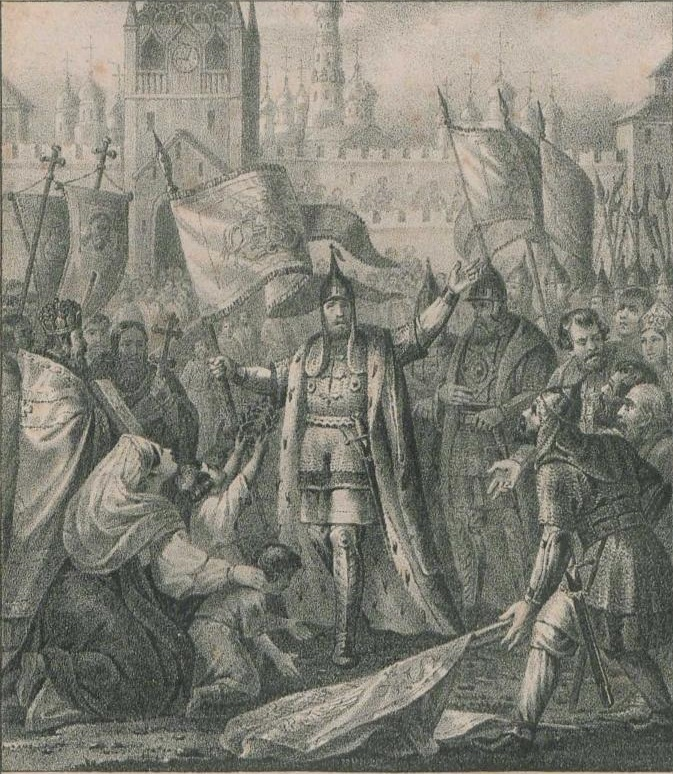
Polish soldiers surrender to prince Pozharsky. Graphic by Boris Chorikov

Finally, on 18 August 1612, the Volunteer Army encamped within five versts from Moscow, just in time when Hetman Chodkiewicz arrived with provisions to the relief of the Polish garrison barricaded within the Moscow Kremlin. The very next day, Pozharsky advanced to the Arbat Gate of the city and two days later he engaged with Chodkiewicz's contingent in a four-day battle. The outcome was in no small part due to decisive actions of Pozharsky's ally, Prince Dmitry Trubetskoy, who captured the provisions intended for the Poles quartered in the Kremlin. As a result, a famine broke out among the Poles and they had to surrender to Pozharsky and Trubetskoy in October, after being guaranteed safe passage and humane treatment. Nonetheless, most of the Poles were slaughtered upon exiting the Kremlin and few survived captivity.

The soldiers of Dmitry Pozharsky and Kuzma Minin observed the obligations but Dmitry Troubetskoy's Cossacks attacked the prisoners and robbed them, killing many in the process.

=== After the war ===
Pozharsky and Trubetskoy presided over the Muscovite government for half a year, until a new tsar was elected by the Zemsky Sobor, whereupon Pozharsky was made a boyar and Trubetskoy was honoured even more highly. The Time of Troubles was now over, but minor risings couldn't be subdued for an extended period of time. In 1615, Pozharsky operated against the Lisowczycy and three years later he fell upon the forces of Vladislaus IV, yet the conservative system of mestnichestvo precluded him from taking supreme command in any of these engagements. He governed Novgorod in 1628–30 and fortified Moscow against an expected attack of the Crimean Tatars in 1637. Pozharsky's last taste of battle came during the ill-fated Smolensk campaign, when he was relegated to secondary roles.

As soon as peace had been restored, Pozharsky was given some enviable posts in the Muscovite administration. Among other positions, he managed the Prikaz (Order) of Transport in 1619, the Prikaz (Order) of Police in 1621–28 and the Prikaz (Order) of Moscow Judges in 1637–37 and 1640–42. He was summoned by the tsar to confer with the English ambassadors in 1617 and with the Polish ones in 1635. In recognition of his services, he was granted extensive estates around Moscow, where he commissioned several churches, interpreted in retrospect as monuments to his own victory against the Lithuanians and Poles during a dire crisis in the history of Russian statehood. One such tent-like church survives in his suburban estate of Medvedkovo. Another was the Kazan Cathedral in Moscow, adjoining Red Square from north-east, a direction whence Pozharsky's army arrived to salvage the Muscovites in 1612.

Shortly before his death, he drew up his last will and testament, in which he cited income derived from the sale of alcohol (kabaks), kept separate, as an act of piety, from those portions of his property that were bequeathed to churches. He also owned a large number of horses, carefully listed in the will, suggesting that he was a keen connoisseur of horses. Prince Pozharsky married twice and had three sons; his princely line became extinct with the death of his grandson in 1685. His granddaughter was married to Prince Yuri Dolgorukov, the most famous Russian commander of the time.

== Legacy ==
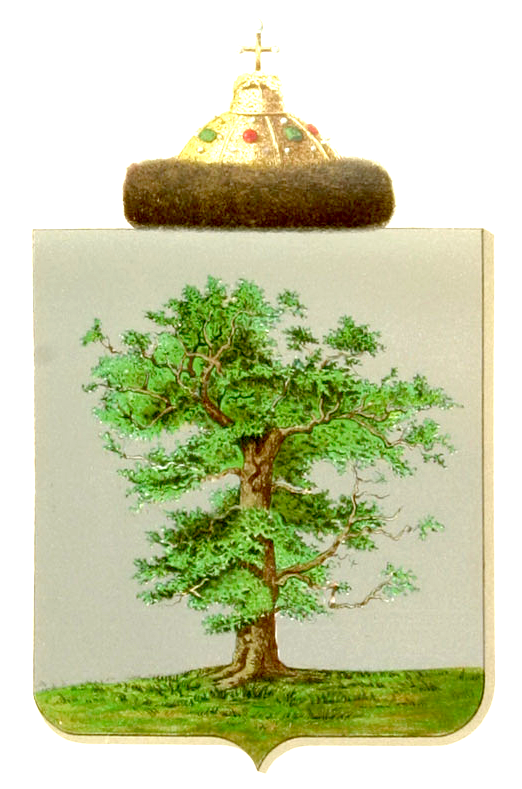
Pozharsky family coat of arms, as one of the Starodubsky princes stock, recreated in the 18th century

Pozharsky's memory would be cherished by the Romanov dynasty which to a great extent owned the crown due to his prowess and skill. When patriotic feelings were on the rise during the Napoleonic Wars, a bronze Monument to Minin and Pozharsky was erected on Red Square. The day when Pozharsky and Minin entered the Moscow Kremlin as liberators was reestablished as a national holiday in 2005. During Euro 2012 group game between Russia and Poland, Russian fans unfurled a huge banner that read 'This is Russia' with Pozharsky's image.

Dmitry Pozharsky is a strong unifying figure for those professional historians who oppose Romanovs' version of Russian history for being extremely one-sided. Professor Andrei Fursov was also outspoken about the illegitimacy of Mikhail's election: "Because they gathered some random people who screamed 'Mikhail'... The screamers supported him but there was no choice, there were armed Cossacks nearby! Here it is, a new tsar. Boyars could console themselves, firstly, by the fact they had remained intact; secondly, by the fact "Misha Romanov is young, he has not reached his full mind yet and will be obedient to us"; thirdly, the fact Pozharsky did not become tsar... That is why they did not like him [Pozharsky]. He was a Hero, and they, mostly, were traitors. Indeed, in 1610, the Moscow boyars were guided by selfish class interest, swore allegiance to Vladislav, and they were ready to “lie down” under his father Sigismund. It isn't surprising the traitorous boyars had been sitting with Poles as their allies in Kremlin. When Kremlin was taken, Pozharsky has made a huge mistake. Instead of bringing the traitors to justice, he has declared them [liberated] prisoners of Poles."

== Gallery ==
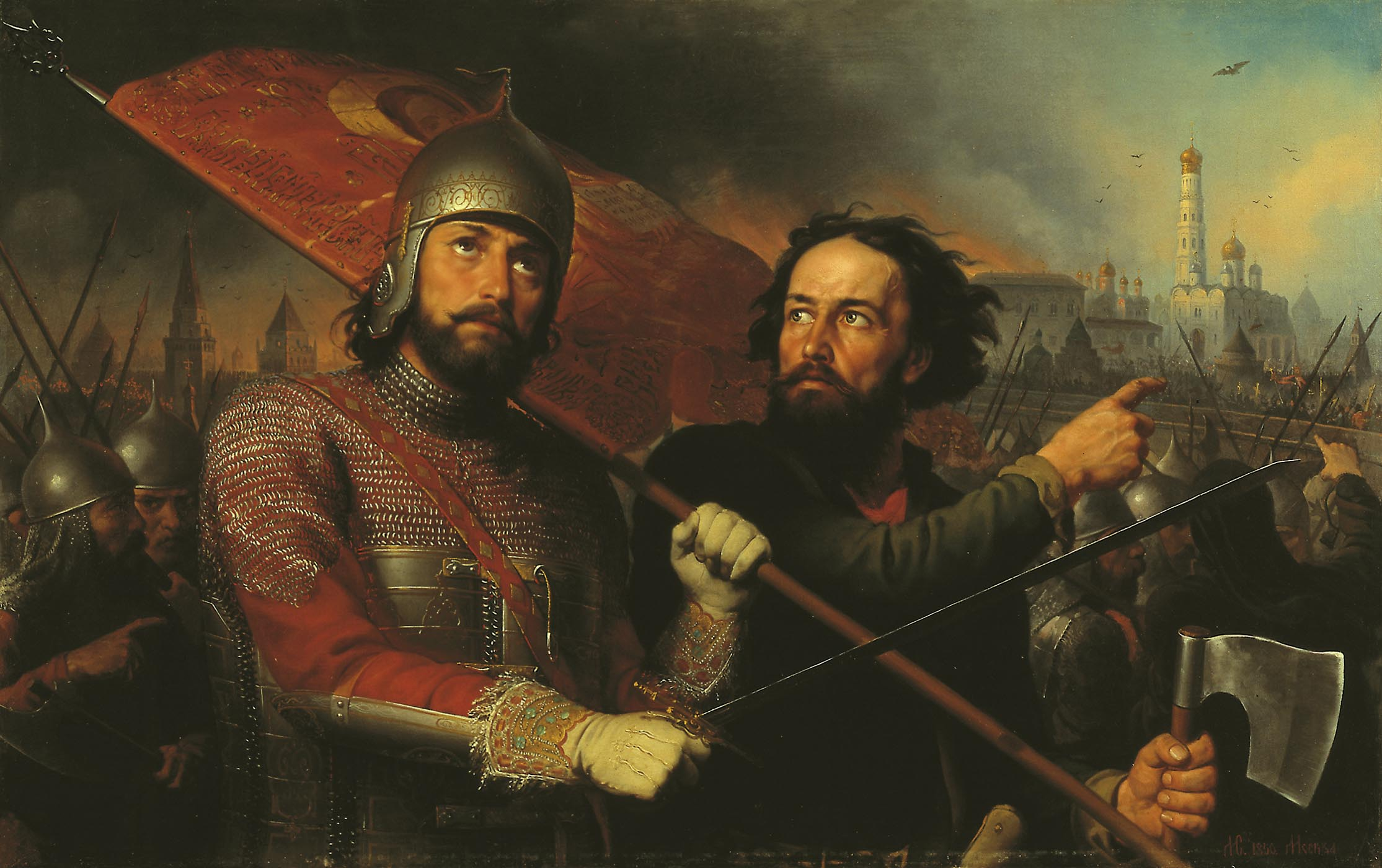
Minin and Pozharsky (right to left) by Mikhail Scotti

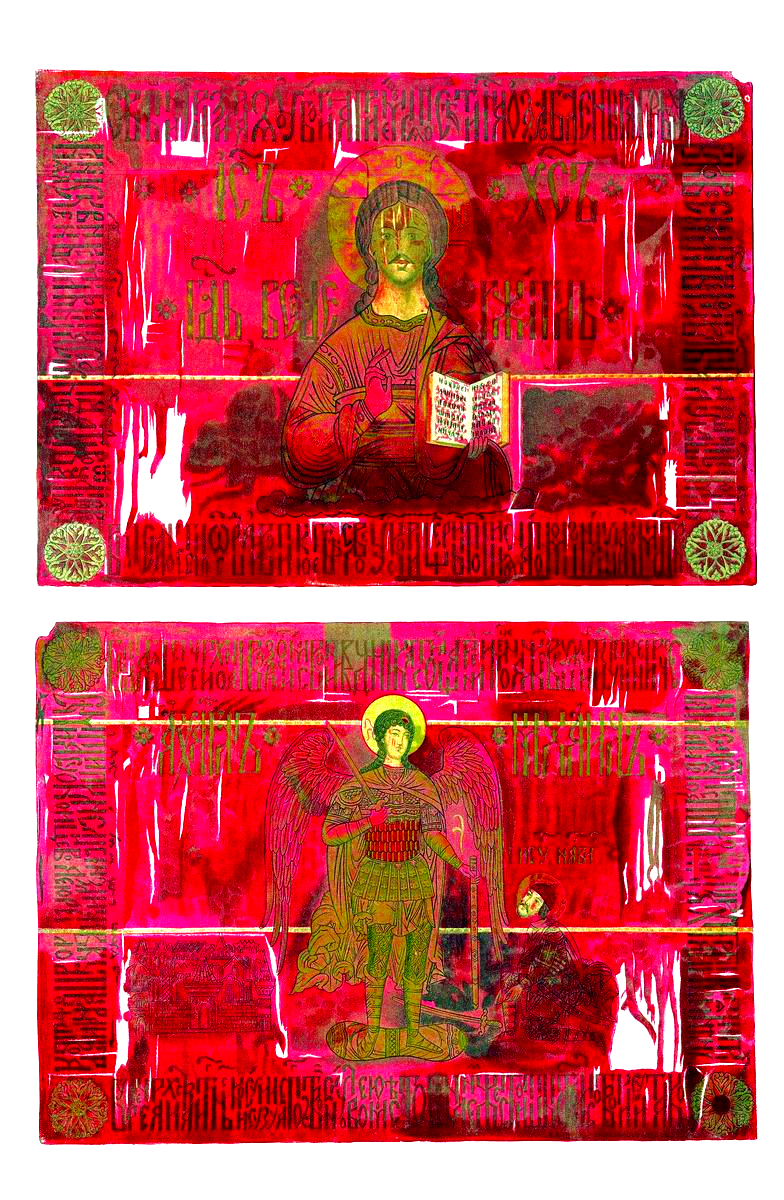
Battle banner of Dmitry Pozharsky features icons of Jesus Christ and Archangel Michael

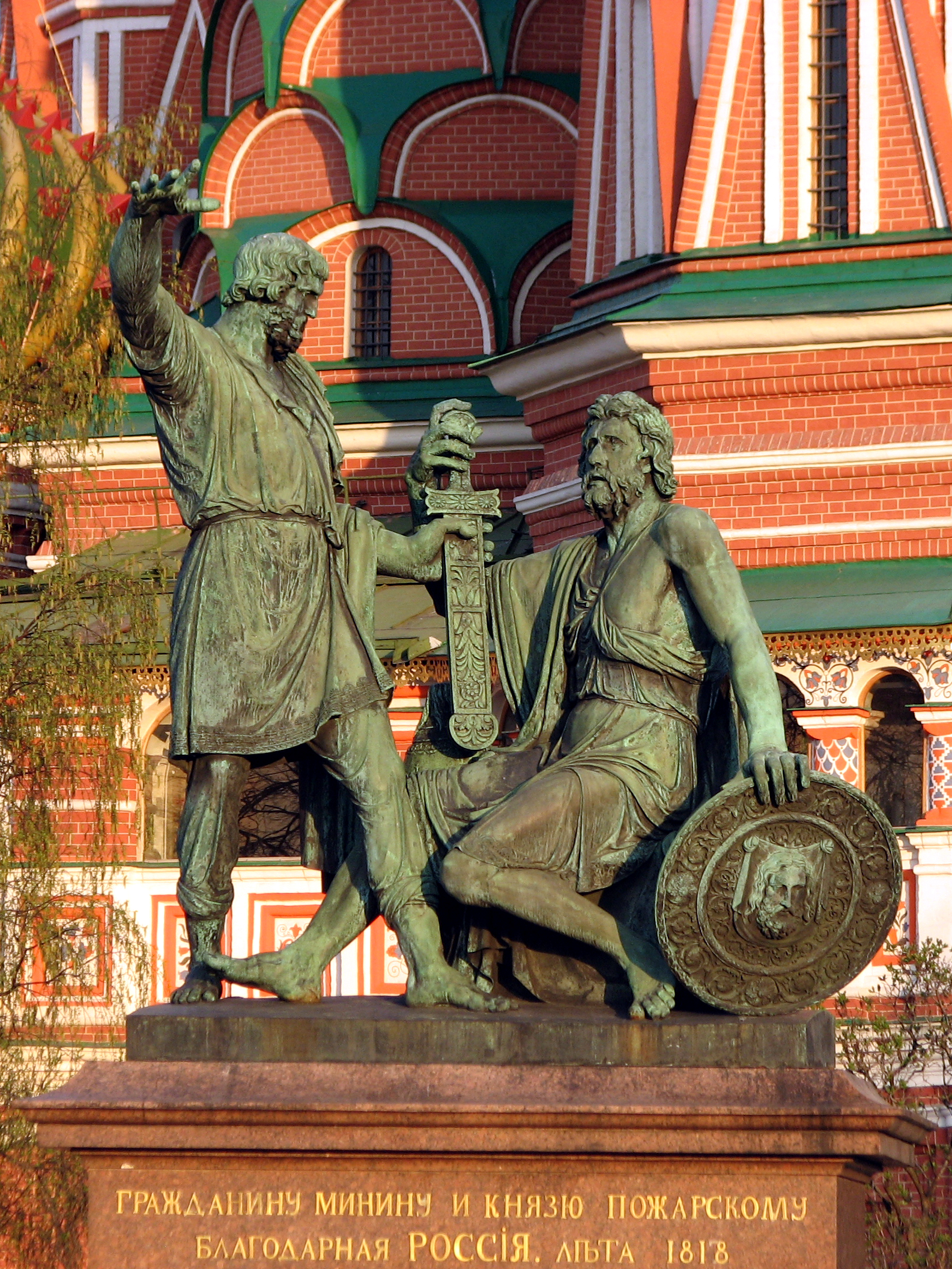
Pozharsky and Minin monument (1804–16) in front of Saint Basil's Cathedral

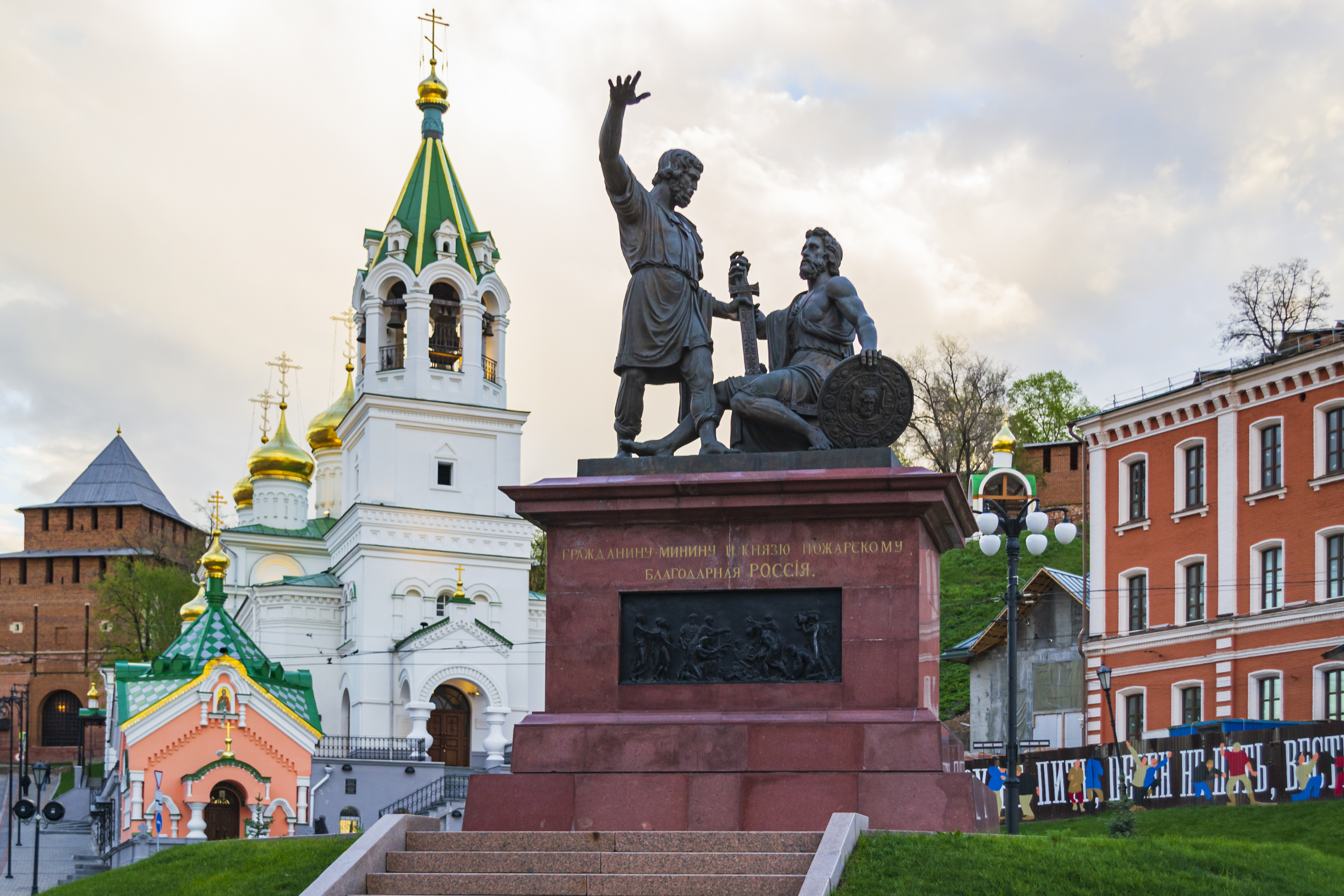
Replica of the monument in Nizhny Novgorod

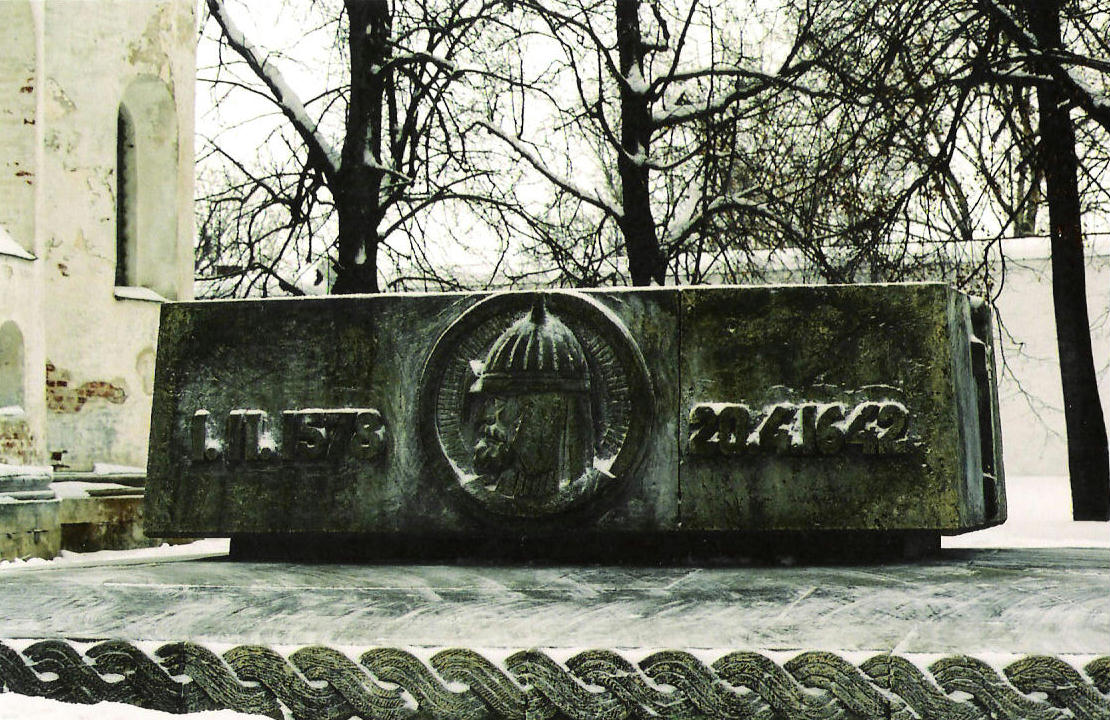
Monument at Suzdal, Russia

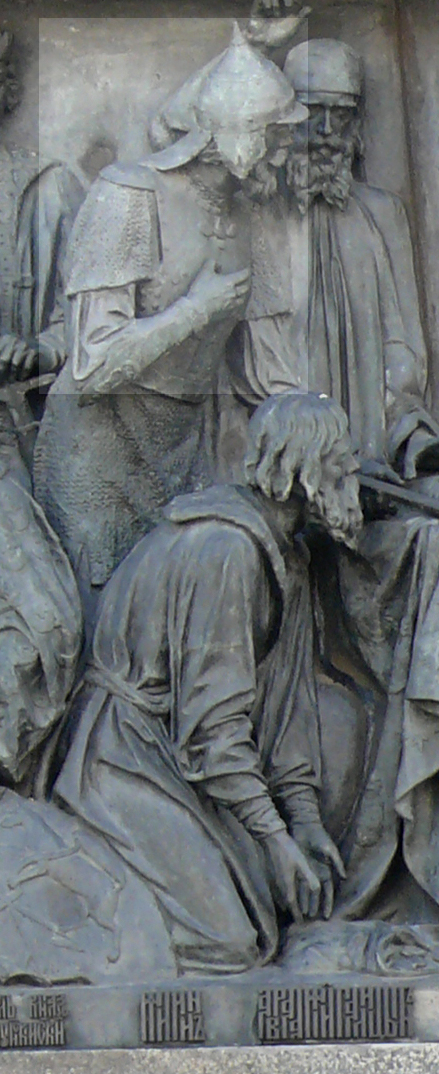
A sculpture for Dmitry Pozharsky on the Millennium of Russia monument at Veliky Novgorod

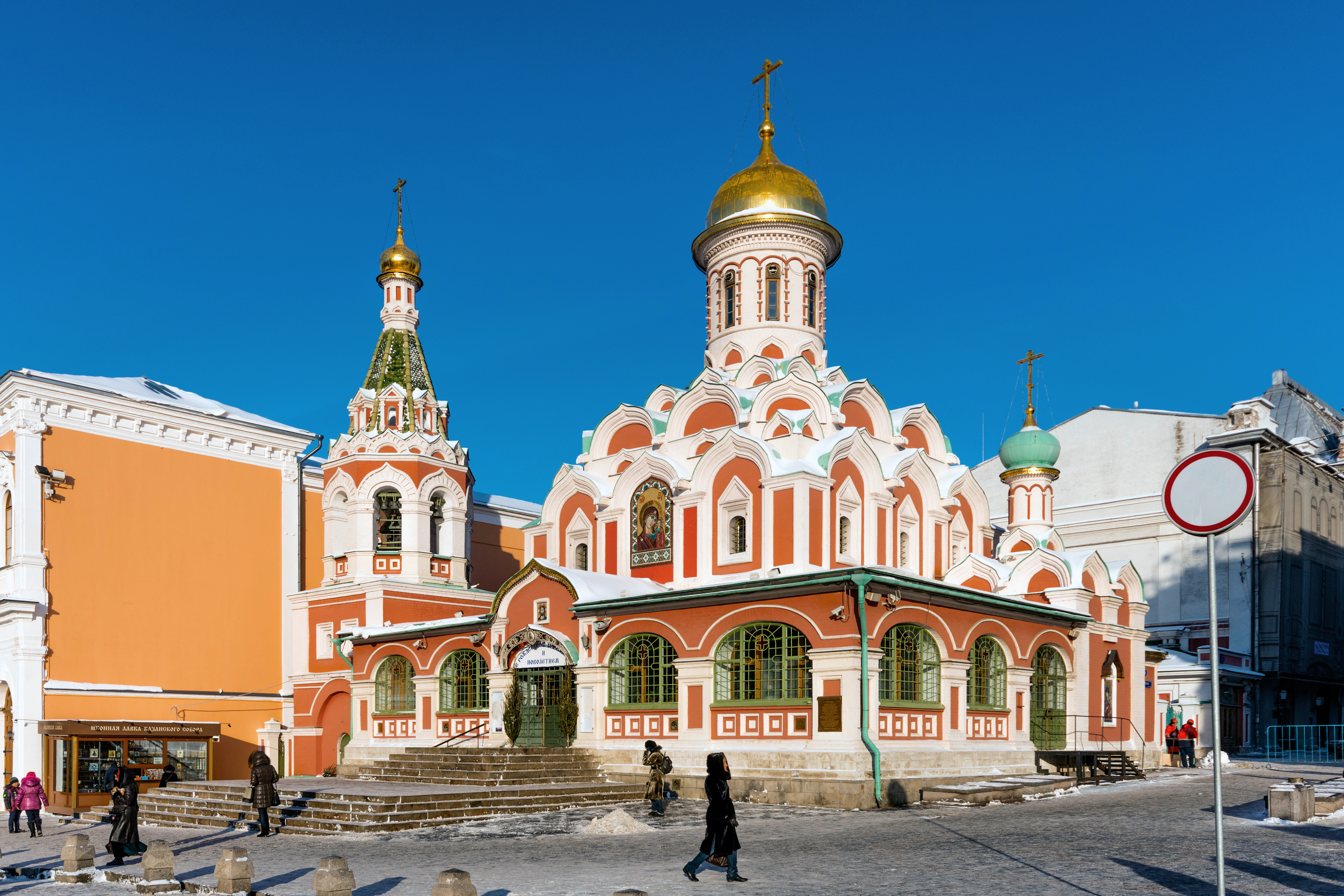
Kazan Cathedral, commissioned by Prince Pozharsky on Red Square

== Sources ==
- (in Russian) Koz'ma Zakharych Minin-the-withered-arm and Prince Dmitry Mikhaylovich Pozharsky, Mykola Kostomarov, "Russian History in Biographies of its main figures".
- (in Russian) The antique heroes of the Russian people's militia "Kommersant-Den'gi", November 5, 2002.
