= Dmitry Troubetskoy =

Russian prince

Dmitry Timofeevich Trubetskoy
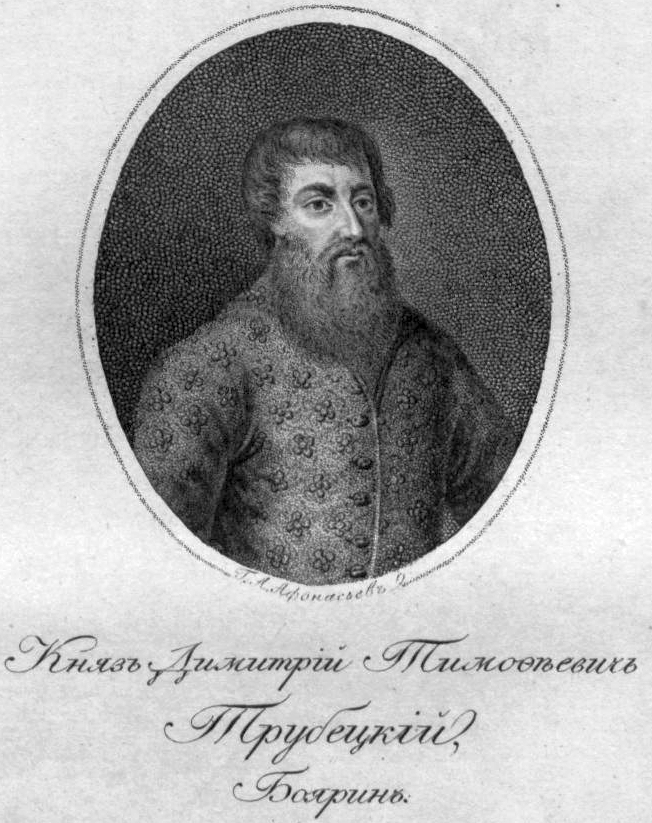

Leader of the Zemsky government
- In office Fall 1612 – Spring 1613
- Preceded by: Fedor Mstislavsky (as the leader of the Seven Boyars)
- Succeeded by: Michael I (as Tsar of Russia)

Personal details
- Died: June 24, 1625

Prince Dmitry Timofeyevich Troubetzkoy (died June 24, 1625) was a Russian military and political figure during the Time of Troubles, one of the leaders in a rebellion against the Polish occupation and the leader of the Zemsky Sobor's provisional government.

Together with Dmitry Pozharsky and Kuzma Minin, he directed the release of the capital from the Poles, and for the time after the expulsion of the Poles and before the election of Mikhail Romanov, he was elected ruler of the Russian state. For his activities, he received the title of "Savior of the Fatherland" and was one of the contenders for the royal throne at the Zemsky Sobor of 1613.

== Biography ==
Trubetskoy was first mentioned on April 11, 1607. He was in Kozelsk (probably as governor). He was dissatisfied with the policy of Vasily Shuisky and in December 1608 he joined the army of False Dmitry II.

After the death of False Dmitry II, Trubetskoy enters into negotiations with Prokopy Lyapunov on the organization of the first rebellion to liberate Moscow from the Polish-Lithuanian occupiers and the «Seven Boyars».

The first militia in April–May 1611 stormed the walls of the "Zemlyanoy gorod" and the walls of the "Belyy gorod", freeing up most of Moscow (more than 95%), and locked up the Poles in the Kremlin and "Kitay gorod". After the split of the militia, Dmitry remained at the head of a few noble detachments and Cossack “camps” near Moscow (together with Ivan Zarutsky).

In the fall of 1612, with an agreement on “unity”, he headed (together with Prince Pozharsky and Minin) the combined military force and the Zemsky government. October 22, Cossacks of Dmitry Trubetskoy stormed Kitay Gorod. This day (November 4, according to the new style) in the 21st century became a national holiday of national unity. Two days later, the Poles began negotiations on surrender, and the Time of Troubles came to an end.

Dmitry Trubetskoy, as the head of the Zemsky government, headed Russia before the election of Mikhail Romanov as tsar (March 3, 1613). He held the scepter at Mikhail Romanov's coronation. Later, Mikhail Romanov appointed Trubetskoy governor to Siberia, where he died in Tobolsk on June 24, 1625. From Tobolsk, his body was transported for burial in the Trinity-Sergius Lavra. The grave of Trubetskoy is located in the underlining of the Trinity Cathedral next to the graves of his brother, father and first wife.
