= Mikhail Scotti =

Russian artist (1814–1861)

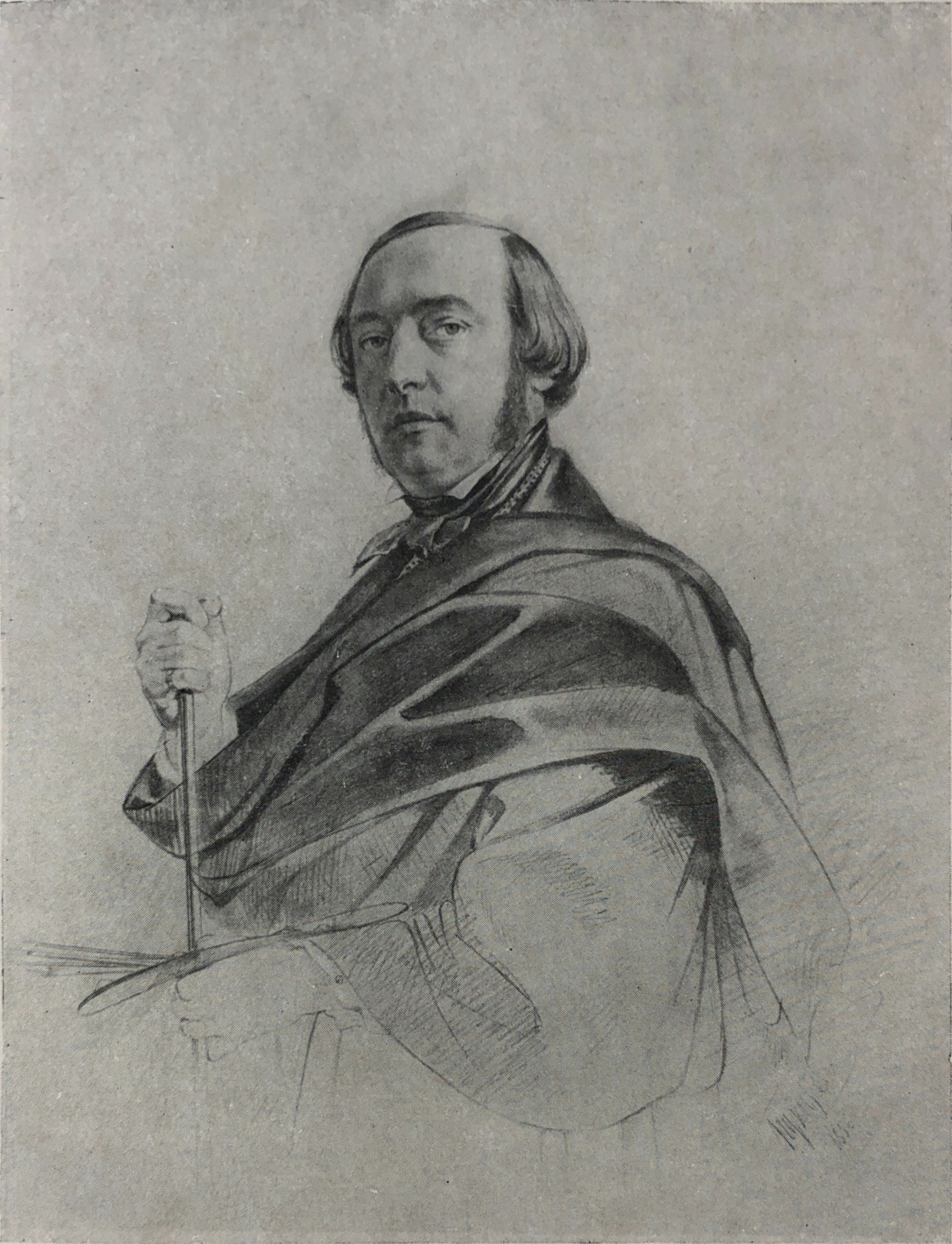
- Portrait drawing by Vasili Pukirev, 1856
- Born: 17 October 1814; Saint Petersburg, Russian Empire
- Died: 22 February 1861 (aged 46); Paris, French Empire
- Resting place: Montmartre Cemetery, Paris
- Education: Alexei Yegorov
- Known for: Painting
- Style: Academism
- Elected: Member Academy of Arts (1843); Professor by rank (1855)

Michel Angelo Pietro Scotti, russified as Mikhail Ivanovich Scotti (Russian: Михаи́л Ива́нович Ско́тти; 29 October 1814 — 11 March 1861) was a Russian painter of Italian descent, best known for his portrait and history paintings, typical of late Romantic/Academic style.

== Biography ==
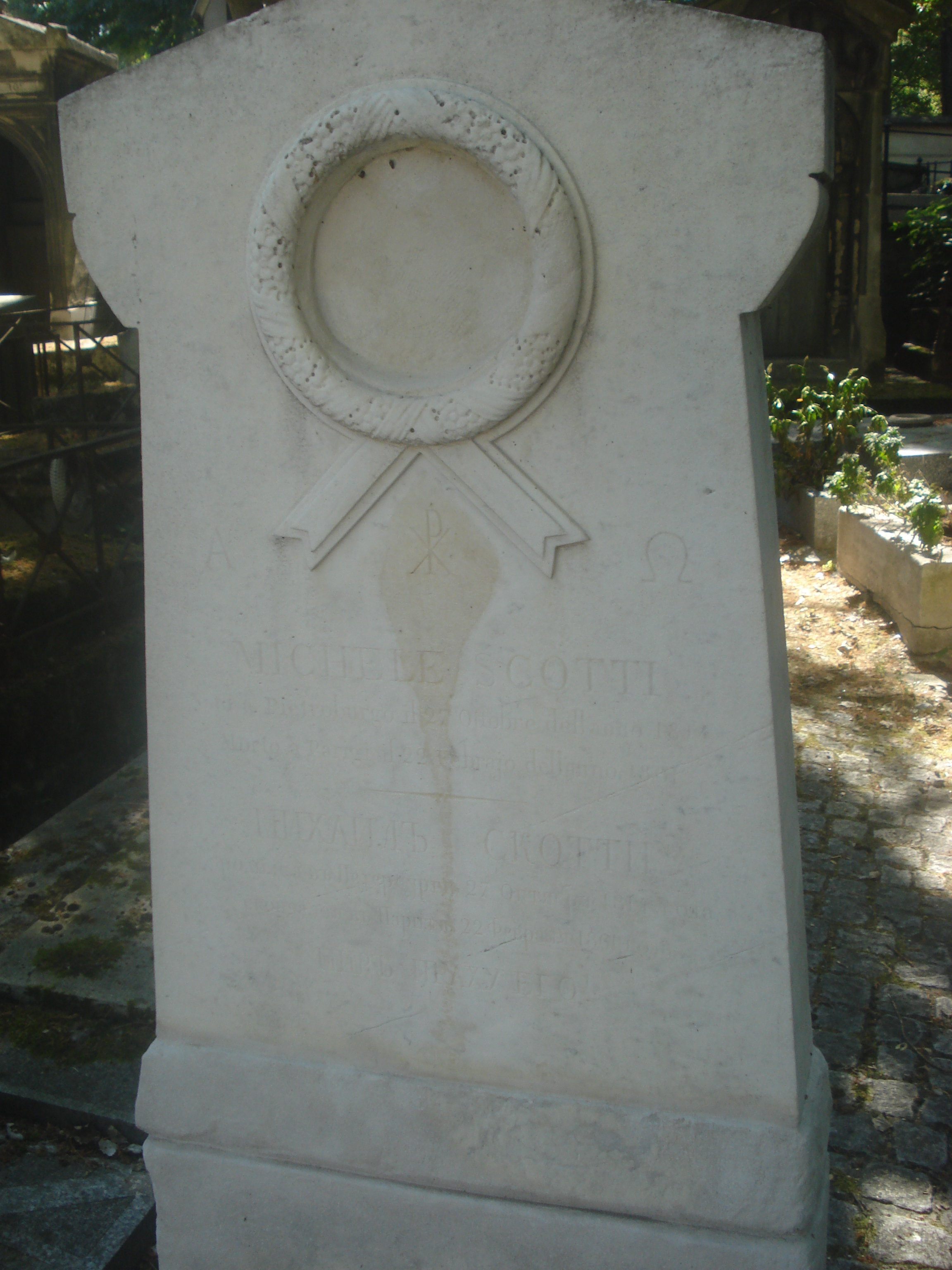
Scotti's grave.

His father was the decorative painter, Ivan Karlovich Scotti (originally, Giovanni Battista Scotti), who was probably born in Northern Italy and brought to Russia at the age of ten by his father, Carlo, also a painter, who was invited there by Giacomo Quarenghi.

He received his primary education at Saint Catherine's Catholic school. After his father's death, he was adopted and raised by history painter Alexei Yegorov, who had himself been an orphan. He also audited classes at the Imperial Academy of Arts and was awarded a silver medal for drawing from life. He graduated with a gold medal in 1835. For a time, he worked on the Shepelev estate, near Ardatov, giving drawing lessons and painting icons.

Shortly after, he went to Italy, by way of Germany with Count Pavel Kutaisov, chairman of the Imperial Society for the Encouragement of the Arts, and remained there until 1844. That year, he painted icons for the Russian Orthodox chapel at the embassy in Istanbul. In 1845, he created another series of icons for Saviour Cathedral in Nizhny Novgorod, for which he was awarded the title of "Academician".

After 1849, he went to Moscow to replace Fyodor Zavyalov as a teacher and inspector at the Moscow School of Painting, Sculpture and Architecture. His students there included Konstantin Makovsky, Nikolai Nevrev, Vasily Perov and Sergei Gribkov. He also continued to paint numerous religious works; notably at the Annunciation Church in Saint Petersburg, under the direction of its designer, Konstantin Thon.

In 1857, he began to travel, visiting Italy, Spain and France. He died in Paris after a brief, sudden illness and was buried at the Montmartre Cemetery.

== Works ==
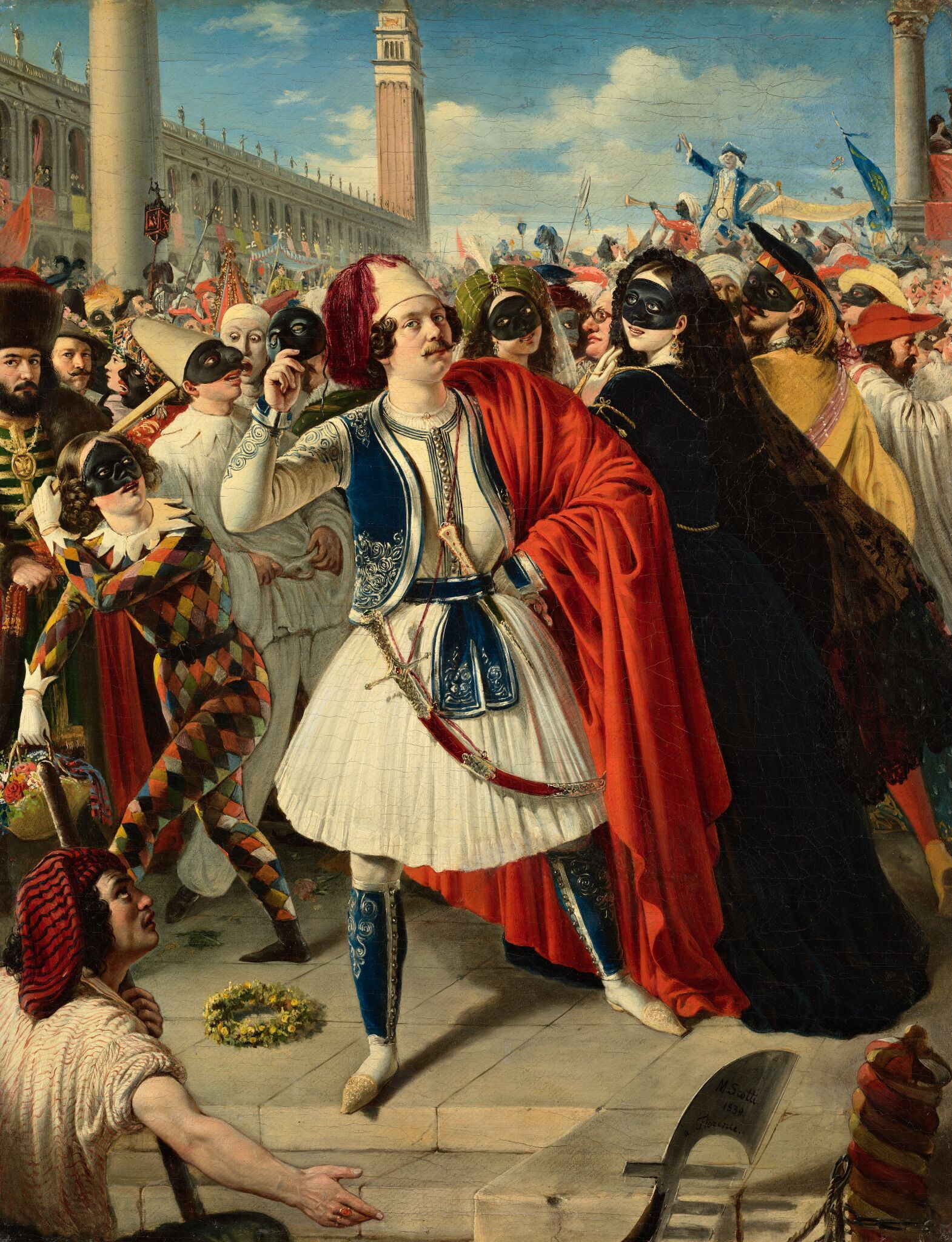
At the Carnival of Venice, 1839; Tretyakov Gallery

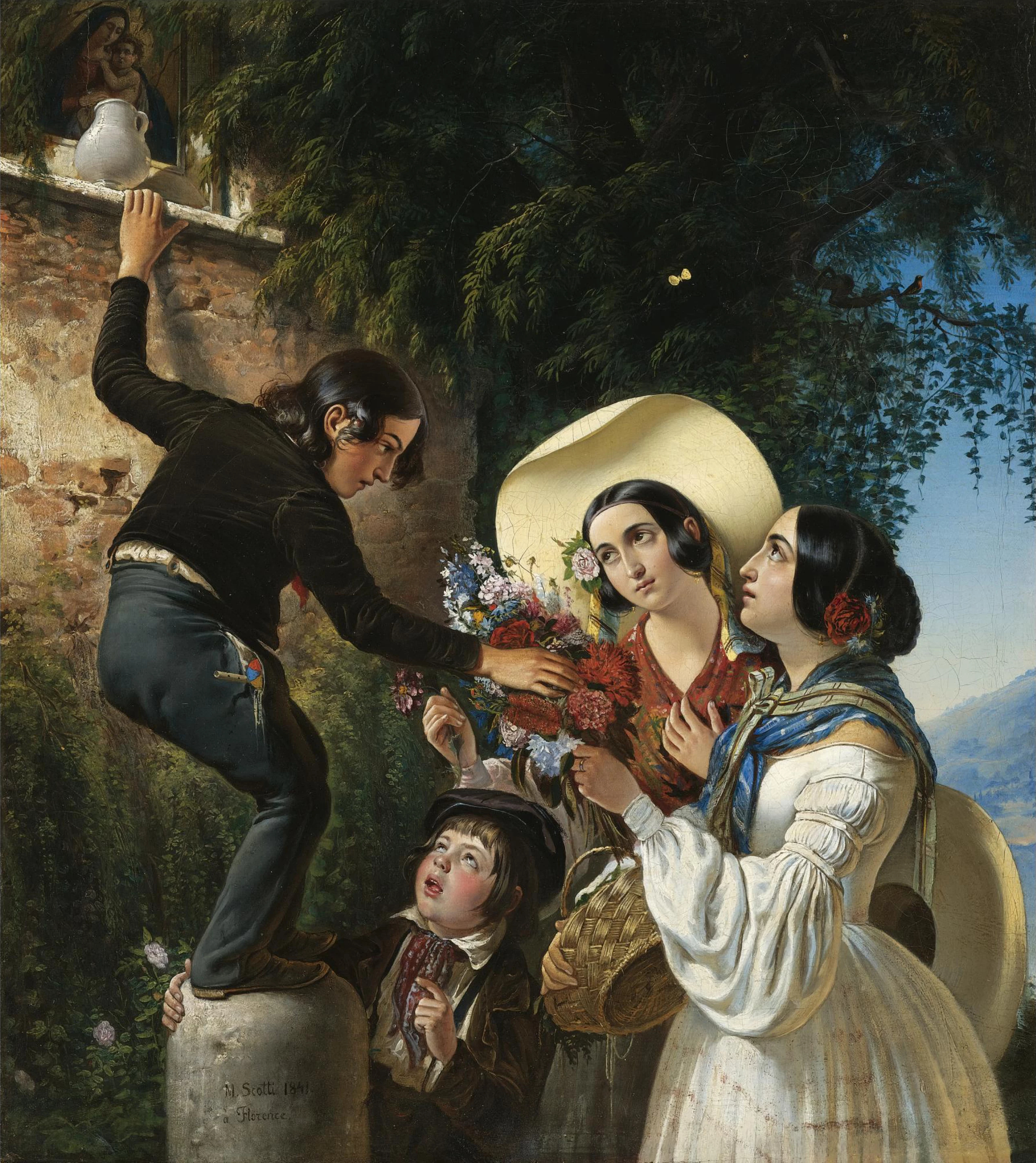
Flowers for the Madonna, 1841; auctioned at Sotheby's in June 2008

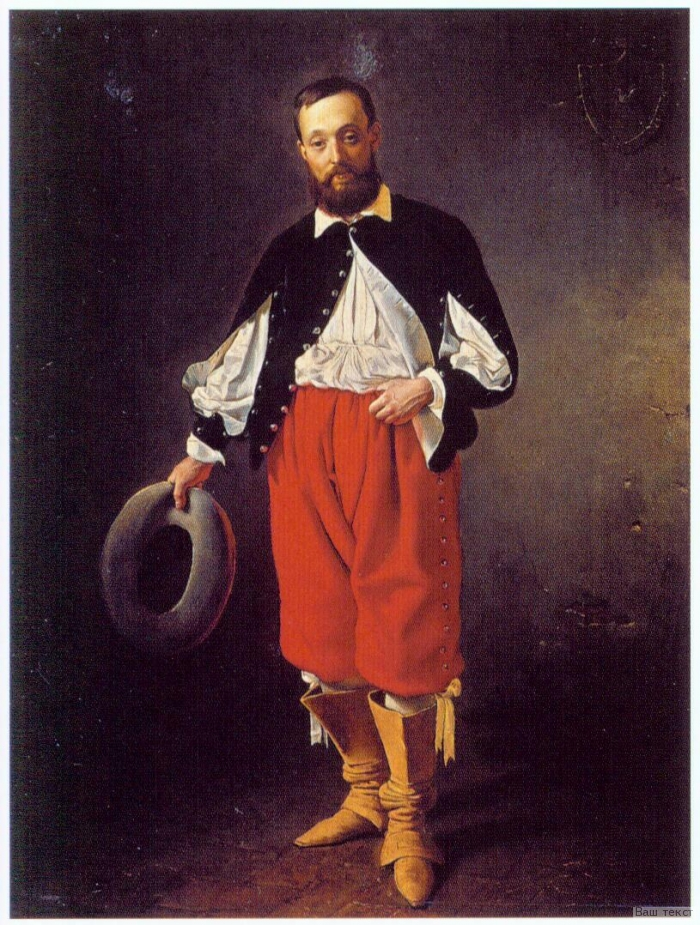
Matvey Bibikov, 1843; Tretyakov Gallery

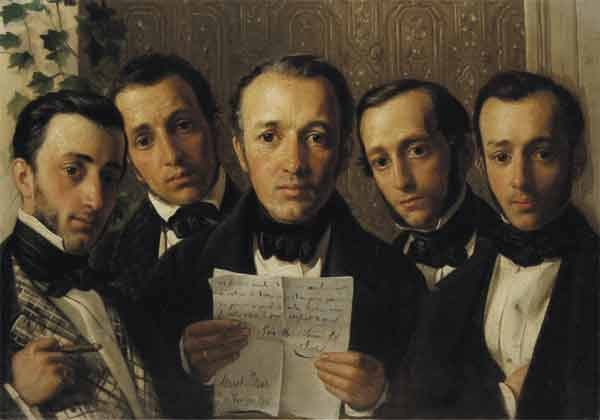
Benois Brothers, 1847; Russian Museum

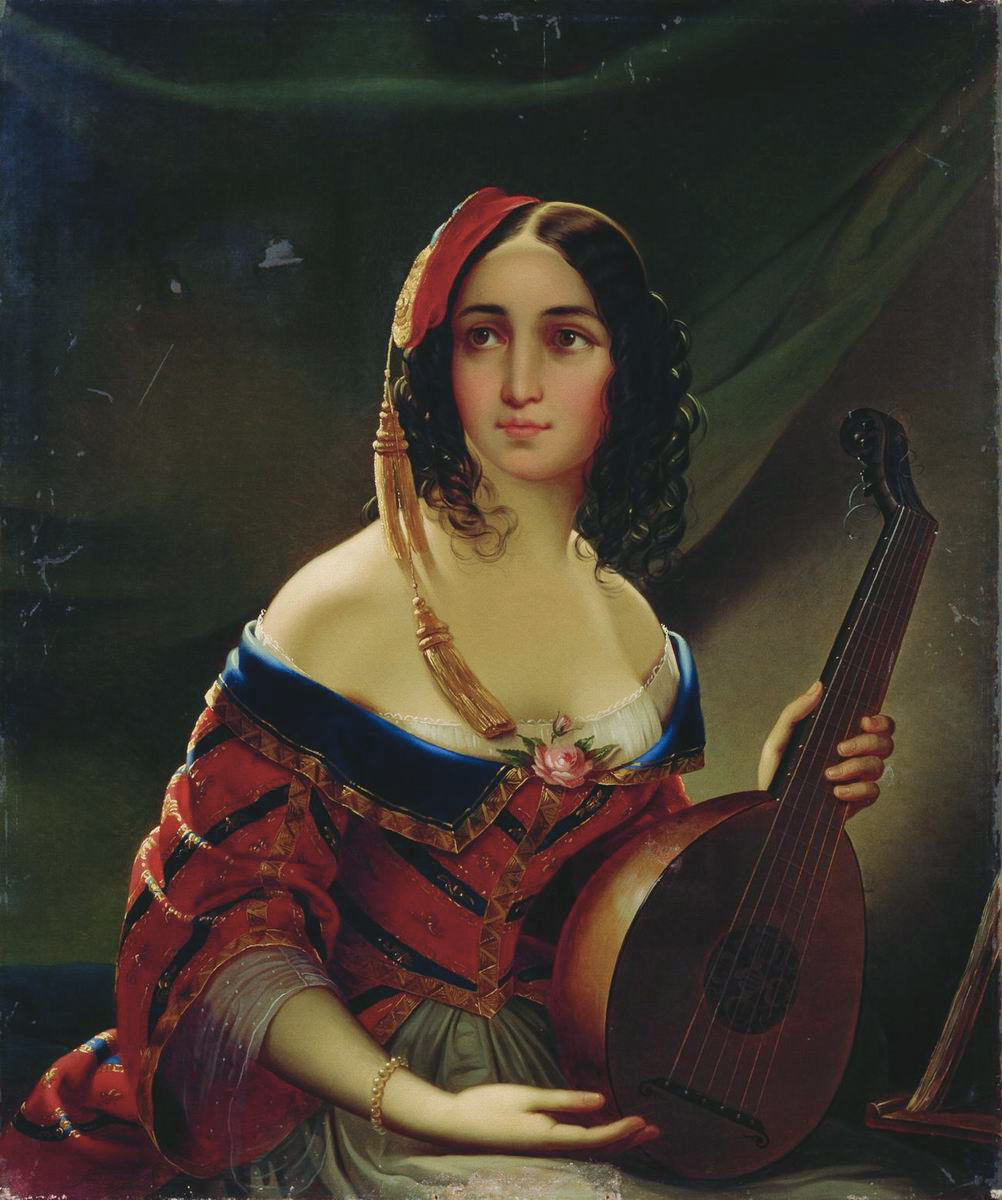
Italian Lady, 1840s; Komi National Gallery, Syktyvkar

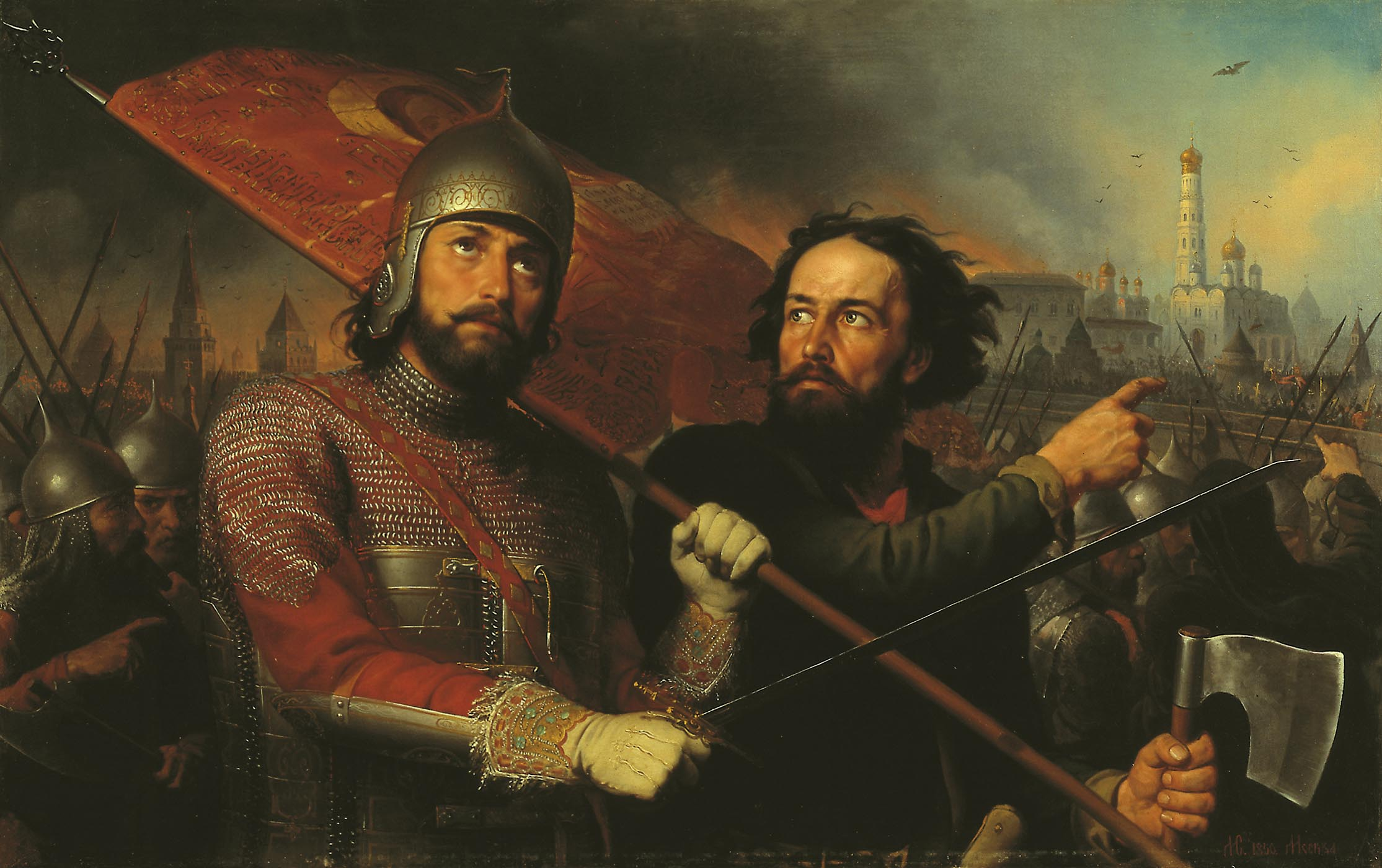
Kuzma Minin and Prince Dmitry Pozharsky, 1850; Art Museum, Nizhny Novgorod
