= Zemsky Sobor =

Parliament of the Tsardom of Russia

- Земский собор

Agency overview
- Formed: 1549
- Preceding agency: Veche
- Dissolved: 1684
- Superseding agency: Governing Senate
- Headquarters: Moscow Kremlin
- Parent department: Boyar duma

The Zemsky Sobor (Russian: зе́мский собо́р, IPA: [ˈzʲemskʲɪj sɐˈbor], lit. 'assembly of the land') was a parliament of the Tsardom of Russia's estates of the realm active during the 16th and 17th centuries.

The assembly represented Russia's feudal classes in three categories: Nobility and the high bureaucracy, the Holy Sobor of the Orthodox clergy, and representatives of "commoners" including merchants and townspeople. Assemblies could be summoned either by the tsar, the patriarch, or the boyar duma, to decide current agenda, controversial issues or enact major pieces of legislation.

== Tsardom of Russia ==
In the 16th century, Tsar Ivan the Terrible held the first Zemsky Sobor in 1549, holding several assemblies primarily as a rubber stamp but also to address initiatives taken by the lower nobility and townspeople.

=== Times of Troubles ===
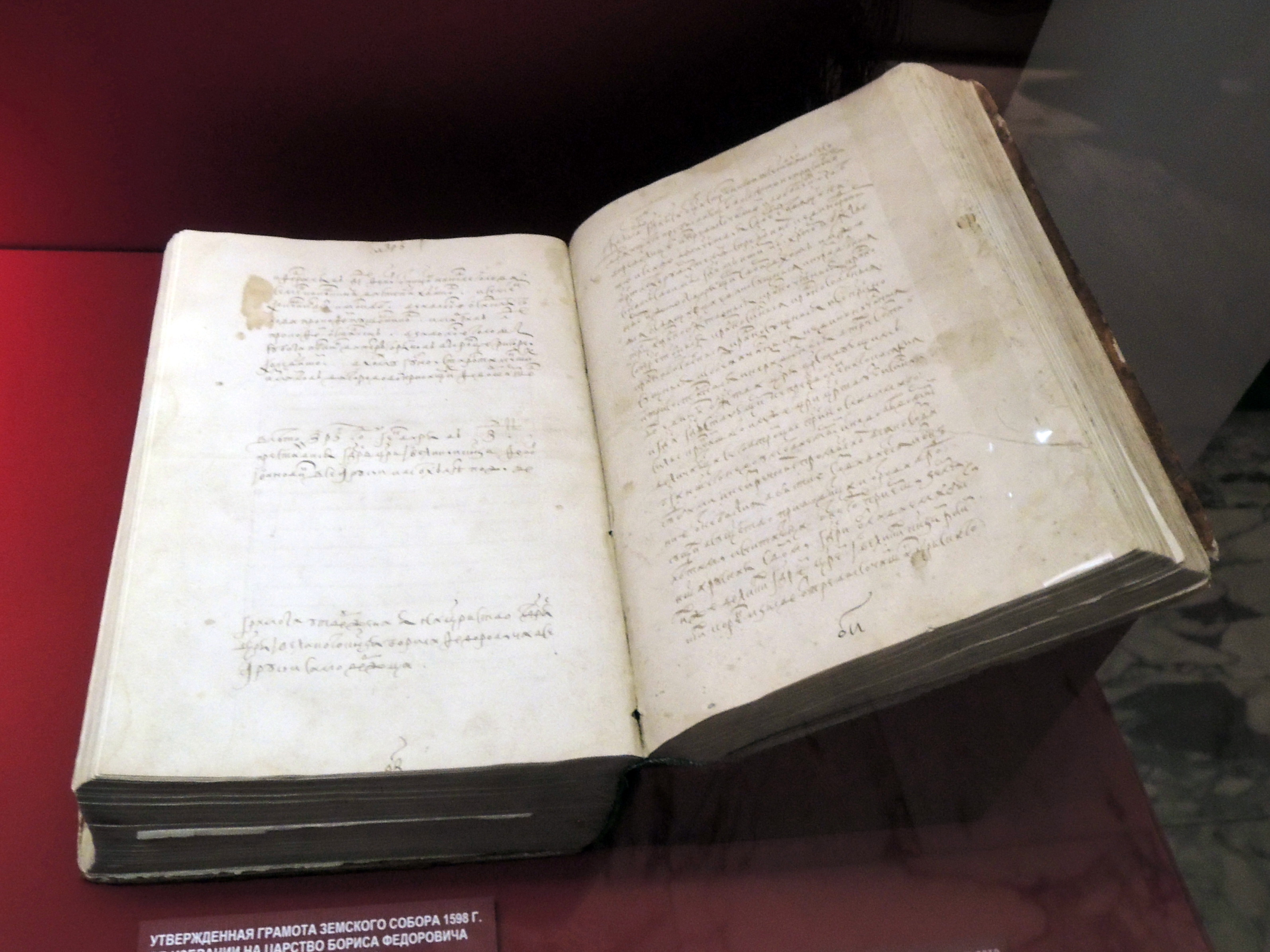
A final agreement (accord) of 1598 signed in Moscow by many prominent Russian nobles to elect Boris Godunov as next Czar of Tsardom of Russia.

The Time of Troubles saw the Zemsky Sobor elect Boris Godunov as Tsar in 1598 during the succession crisis after the end of the Rurik Dynasty. Assemblies were held annually after Mikhail Romanov was elected Tsar in Zemsky Sobor of 1613, but lost influence as the Romanov dynasty became more established, with the assembly to ratify the Treaty of Pereyaslav in 1654 the last for thirty years. The last Zemsky Sobors were held in the 1680s to abolish the mestnichestvo system and to ratify the "Eternal Peace" with Poland-Lithuania. As the Romanovs grew more powerful, the importance of the Zemsky Sobor decreased, and by the reign of Peter the Great, the council was never again summoned

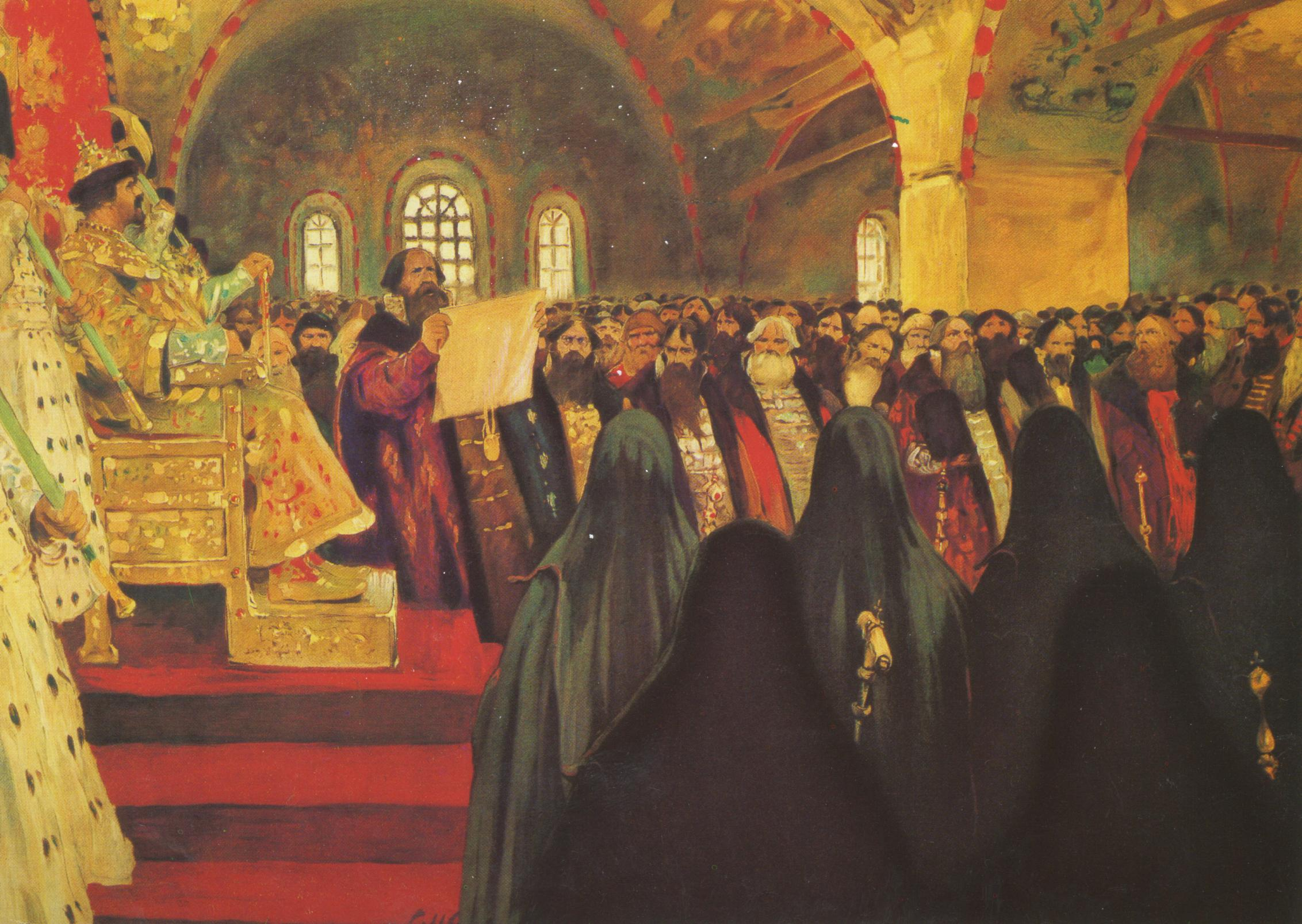
Sergey Ivanov's Zemsky sobor (1908)

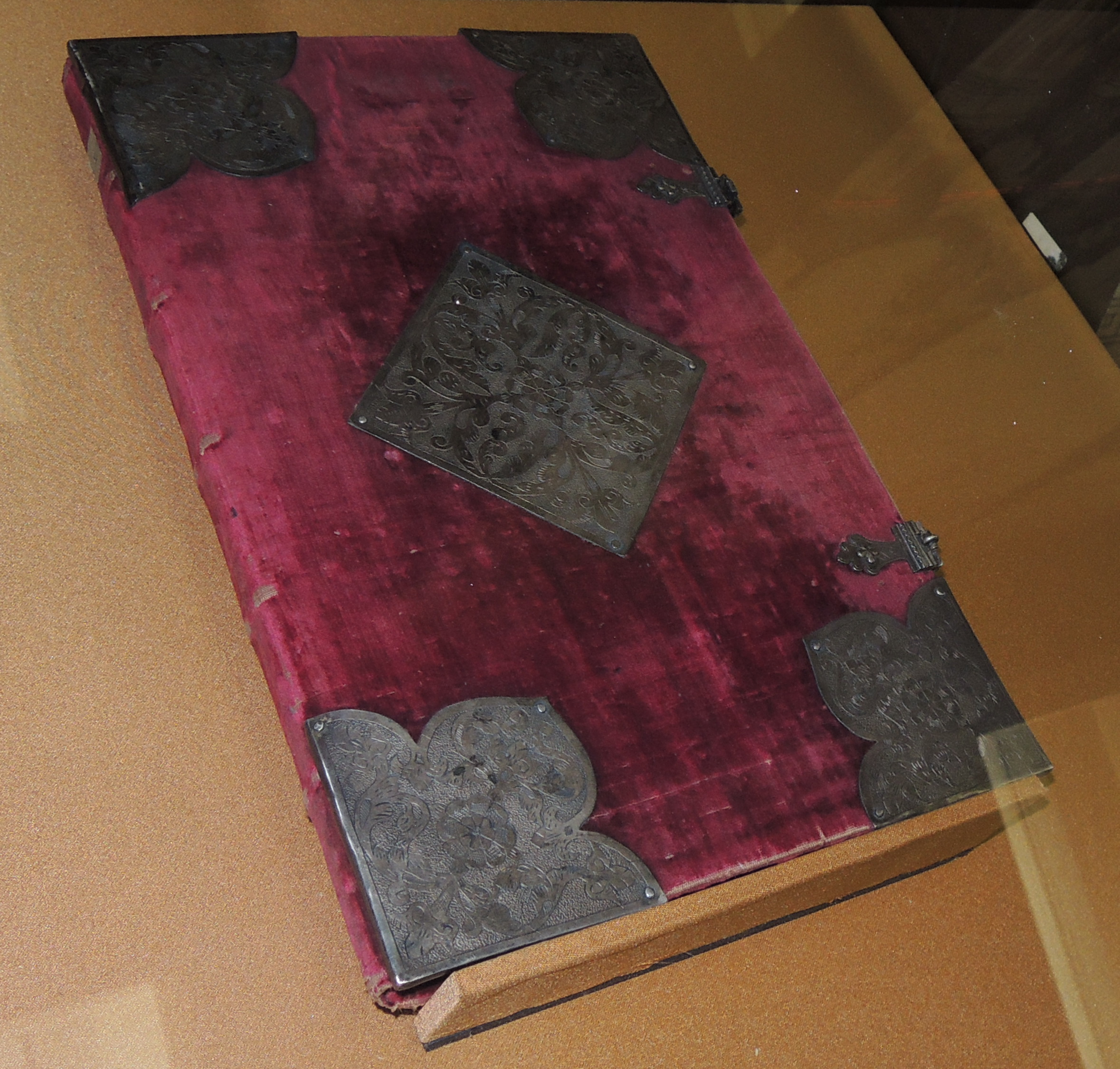
A chapter that records election of Michael of Russia as Tsar signed in 1613.

== 1922 Zemsky Sobor ==
The Zemsky Sobor of Amur region (Приамурский Земский Собор) of the Provisional Priamurye Government was convened in Vladivostok on July 23, 1922, by Mikhail Diterikhs during the Russian Civil War. Diterikhs was a general of the White Army in the Russian Far East and convened the assembly four years after the murder of the Romanov family to proclaim a new monarchy, naming Grand Duke Nicholas Nikolaevich as the Tsar of Russia, with Patriarch Tikhon as the honorary chairman of the Zemsky Sobor. Neither Nikolai or Tikhon were present at the assembly, and the plan was cancelled when the region fell to the Bolsheviks two months later.
