= Mikołaj Struś =

Polish noble (1577–1627)

Korczak Coat of Arms

Mikołaj Struś (1577–1627) (Korczak coat of arms) was a Colonel of the Polish Army, a starosta and commandant of the Polish garrison in the occupied Moscow Kremlin. He was the last known member of the Strus family of Komarow-Osada. His father was Jakub Strus, and mother was Barbara Potocka.

Strus began military service probably in 1590 or 1591. On 7 March 1591 he was granted royal permission to own real estate near Kamieniec Podolski. In the following years, he took part in a number of wars and military conflicts in eastern areas of the Polish–Lithuanian Commonwealth, as well as in Moldavia, Livonia and the Tsardom of Russia. In 1595, he probably participated in a raid on Moldavia, carried out by Crown Hetman Jan Zamoyski. In 1596, serving under Stanislaw Zolkiewski, he pacified the Nalyvaiko Uprising. In 1600, he once again fought in Moldavia, fighting against Michael the Brave.

In 1601 - 1602, Strus fought against the Kingdom of Sweden in the Polish–Swedish War (1600–29). Among others, he participated in the Siege of Wolmar, Siege of Fellin and the Siege of Weissenstein.

On 19 January 1602 in Vilnius, Strus, as an envoy of Polish cavalry, discussed delayed payments with King Zygmunt III Waza. By 1605, he already was a Rittmeister of a Cossack choragiew, with which he fought Crimean Tatars in the Battle of Udycz, on 28 January 1606.

In the autumn 1609, Strus joined the Siege of Smolensk (1609–11), leading a unit of 150 Hussars, 50 Cossacks and 100 infantry. On 4 July 1610 he fought in the Battle of Klushino, after which he rushed with Aleksander Zborowski and Mikolaj Scibor Marchocki to King Zygmunt III Waza, presenting to him captured flags of the enemy (July 17). In the spring of 1612, together with 1000 infantry and 3000 cavalry, Strus joined forces of Lithuanian Hetman Jan Karol Chodkiewicz, which was sent to reinforce Commonwealth garrison of the Moscow Kremlin.

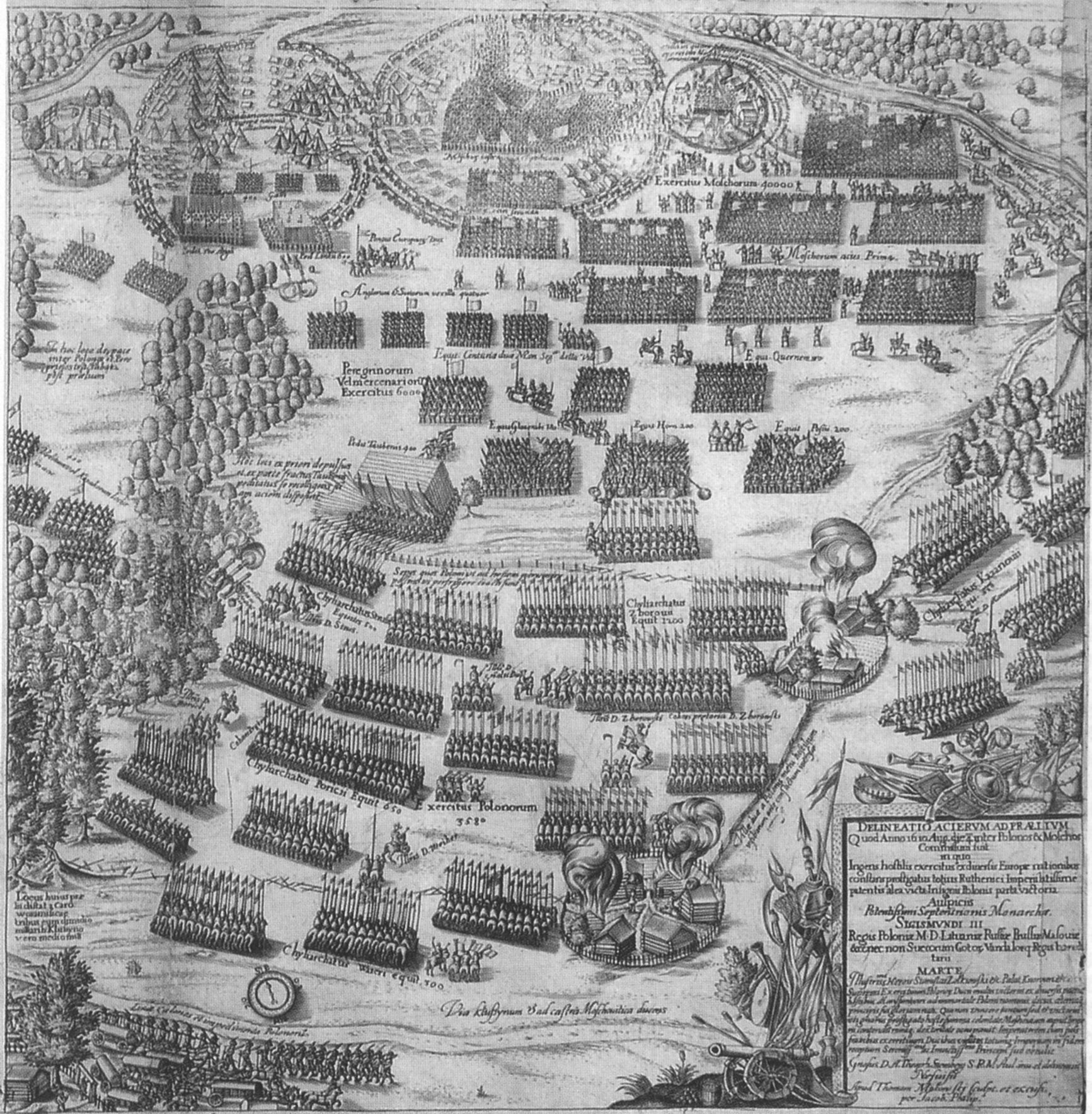
Battle of Klushino

On 27 June 1612 Strus was named commandant of the garrison, and in September of the same year, under Russian pressure, he agreed for negotiations. On 7 November 1612 the Polish-Lithuanian garrison of the Kremlin capitulated: the Russians broke the conditions of the capitulation, and murdered some Polish soldiers. Strus himself was captured and imprisoned in the Chudov Monastery, where he stayed for seven years, despite numerous efforts of Polish authorities. He was released on 10 June 1619, half a year after the Truce of Deulino, and immediately rejoined the Commonwealth army, fighting in the Battle of Cecora (19 September 1620). In this battle, he commanded a unit of 2000 men, and was listed among main leaders of the Polish troops. While fighting, Strus was wounded and captured by Crimean Tatars, who took him with them to Crimea. On 21 July 1621 the szlachta appealed to King Zygmunt III Waza to initiate negotiations to release Strus. The Tatars released him probably in early 1622: following this adventure, Strus withdrew from military service, and died in 1627.

Mikolaj Strus owned the towns of Probuzna and Strusow, located near Trembowla (today part of Ukraine), and the villages of Touste and Hrynkowce in Halych Land.

== Sources ==
- Polski Slownik Biograficzny. Warszawa - Kraków: Polska Akademia Nauk, 2006.
- Kazimierz Pulaski: Kronika polskich rodów szlacheckich Podola, Wolynia i Ukrainy. Brody: Ksiegarnia Feliksa Westa, 1911.
