= 1585 in music =

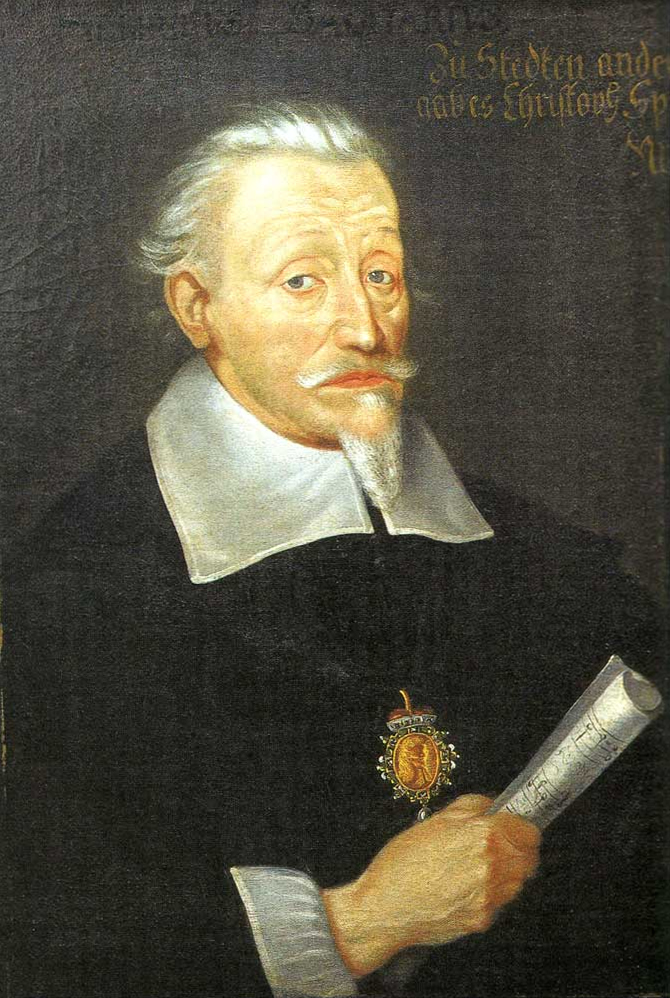
Heinrich Schütz, born in 1585

== Publications ==
- Felice Anerio
  - First book of madrigali spirituali for five voices (Rome: Alessandro Gardano)
  - Second book of madrigali spirituali for five voices (Rome: Alessandro Gardano)
- Giammateo Asola
  - Completorium romanum duae Beatae Virginis antiphonae, scilicet Salve Regina & Regina coeli (Venice: heirs of Girolamo Scotto), also includes four other motets
  - Hymni ad vespertina omnium solennitatum... (Venice: Giacomo Vincenti & Ricciardo Amadino), in two parts
- Ippolito Baccusi – Second book of masses, for five, six, and eight voices (Venice: Giacomo Vincenti & Ricciardo Amadino)
- Giovanni Bassano
  - Fantasies for three voices (Venice: Giacomo Vincenti & Ricciardo Amadino)
  - Ricercate, passagi, et cadentie (Venice: Giacomo Vincenti & Ricciardo Amadino), a collection of examples of instrumental ornamentation.
- Girolamo Belli
  - Psalmi ad vesperas cum hymnis et Magnificat for four voices (Venice: Giacomo Vincenti & Ricciardo Amadino), a collection of music for Vespers, including psalms, hymns, and a Magnificat
  - First book of Sacrae cantiones for six voices (Venice: Giacomo Vincenti & Ricciardo Amadino)
  - Second book of madrigals for five voices (Venice: Giacomo Vincenti & Ricciardo Amadino)
- Joan Brudieu – Madrigals for four voices (Barcelona: Hubert Gotard)
- Joachim a Burck – Dreissig geistliche Lieder auff die Fest durchs Jahr for four voices (Mühlhausen: Georg Hantzsch), settings of hymn texts by Ludwig Helmbold
- Gioseppe Caimo – Fourth book of madrigals for five voices (Milan: Pietro Tini)
- Giovanni Croce – First book of madrigals for five voices (Venice: Angelo Gardano)
- Johannes Eccard – Epithalamion in honorem nuptiarum D. Simonis Levskeri et Catharinae Joannis Pasauri filiae for six voicer (Königsberg: Georg Osterberger), a wedding song
- Stefano Felis
  - Second book of motets for five, six, and eight voices (Venice: Angelo Gardano)
  - Fourth book of madrigals for five voices (Venice: Giacomo Vincenti & Ricciardo Amadino)
- Giovanni Ferretti – Fifth book of canzoni alla napolitana for five voices (Venice: heirs of Girolamo Scotto)
- Ruggiero Giovannelli – Gli sdruccioli, his first book of madrigals for four voices (Rome: Alessandro Grandi)
- Gioseffo Guami – First book of motets for five, six, seven, eight, and ten voices (Venice: Giacomo Vincenti & Ricciardo Amadino)
- Francisco Guerrero – Passio secundum Matthaeum et Joannem (Rome: Alessandro Gardano)
- Paolo Isnardi – Omnes ad vesperas psalmi for four voices (Venice: Giacomo Vincenti & Ricciardo Amadino)
- Jacobus de Kerle – Selectiorum aliquot modulorum for four, five, and eight voices (Prague: Georg Nigrinus)
- Orlande de Lassus
  - Sacrae cantiones for four voices (Munich: Adam Berg)
  - Cantica sacra for six and eight voices (Munich: Adam Berg)
  - Lamentations for five voices (Munich: Adam Berg)
  - Madrigals for five voices (Nuremberg: Catharina Gerlach)
- Claude Le Jeune – Livre de mélanges (Antwerp: Christophe Plantin), a collection of chansons
- Luca Marenzio
  - Third book of madrigals for six voices (Venice: heirs of Girolamo Scotto)
  - Fifth book of madrigals for five voices (Venice: heirs of Girolamo Scotto)
  - First book of madrigals for four voices (Rome: Alessandro Gardano)
  - Second book of canzonette alla napolitana for three voices (Venice: Giacomo Vincenti & Ricciardo Amadino), his second collection of villanelle
  - Third book of villanelle for three voices (Rome: Alessandro Gardano)
- Rinaldo del Mel
  - Third book of motets for five and six voices (Venice: Angelo Gardano)
  - First book of madrigals for five and six voices (Venice: heirs of Girolamo Scotto)
- Philippe de Monte – First book of motets for six and twelve voices (Venice: Angelo Gardano)
- Benedetto Pallavicino – Third book of madrigals for five voices (Venice: Giacomo Vincenti & Ricciardo Amadino)
- Costanzo Porta – Third book of motets for six voices (Venice: Angelo Gardano)

== Classical music ==
- Giovanni Pierluigi da Palestrina – Missa tu es pastor ovium

== Musical theatre ==
- Andrea Gabrielli – Choruses for the play Edippo Tiranno, performed in Vicenza

== Births ==
- October 8 (JC) – Heinrich Schütz, German composer (died 1672)
- date unknown
  - Johann Grabbe, composer (died 1655)
  - Wojciech Dębołęcki, Franciscan friar, writer and composer (died 1646)
- probable – Domenico Allegri, singer and composer (died 1629)
  - Andrea Falconieri, composer (died 1653)

== Deaths ==
- August 30 – Andrea Gabrieli, organist and composer (born c.1532)
- November 28 – Hernando Franco, composer (born 1532)
- December 3 – Thomas Tallis, church musician and composer (born 1505)
