= Stanisław Czapliński =

Polish Colonel

Stanisław Czapliński (Drogoslaw coat of arms) was a colonel of the Polish Army in the Polish–Lithuanian Commonwealth, who participated in the Polish–Muscovite War (1605–18), the so-called Dymitriad. His date of birth is unknown, and he died in 1618.

In 1609, Czapliński commanded a cavalry unit in the army of False Dmitry II. In 1616, following the death of Aleksander Jozef Lisowski, he was named commander of the Lisowczycy. In 1617, together with his men, he captured the town of Meshchovsk, and destroyed the troops of Knyaz Dmitry Pozharsky near Kaluga. Czapliński was probably killed somewhere in Russia during the war.

== Sources ==
- Kazimierz Pułaski: Kronika polskich rodów szlacheckich Podola, Wołynia i Ukrainy. Brody: Księgarnia Feliksa Westa, 1911.
- Tyszkowski, Kazimierz (1938). "Czapliński Stanisław". Polski Słownik Biograficzny. Vol. 4. p. 176.
