= Gorne-Uspensky Convent =

Convent of the Assumption on the Hill
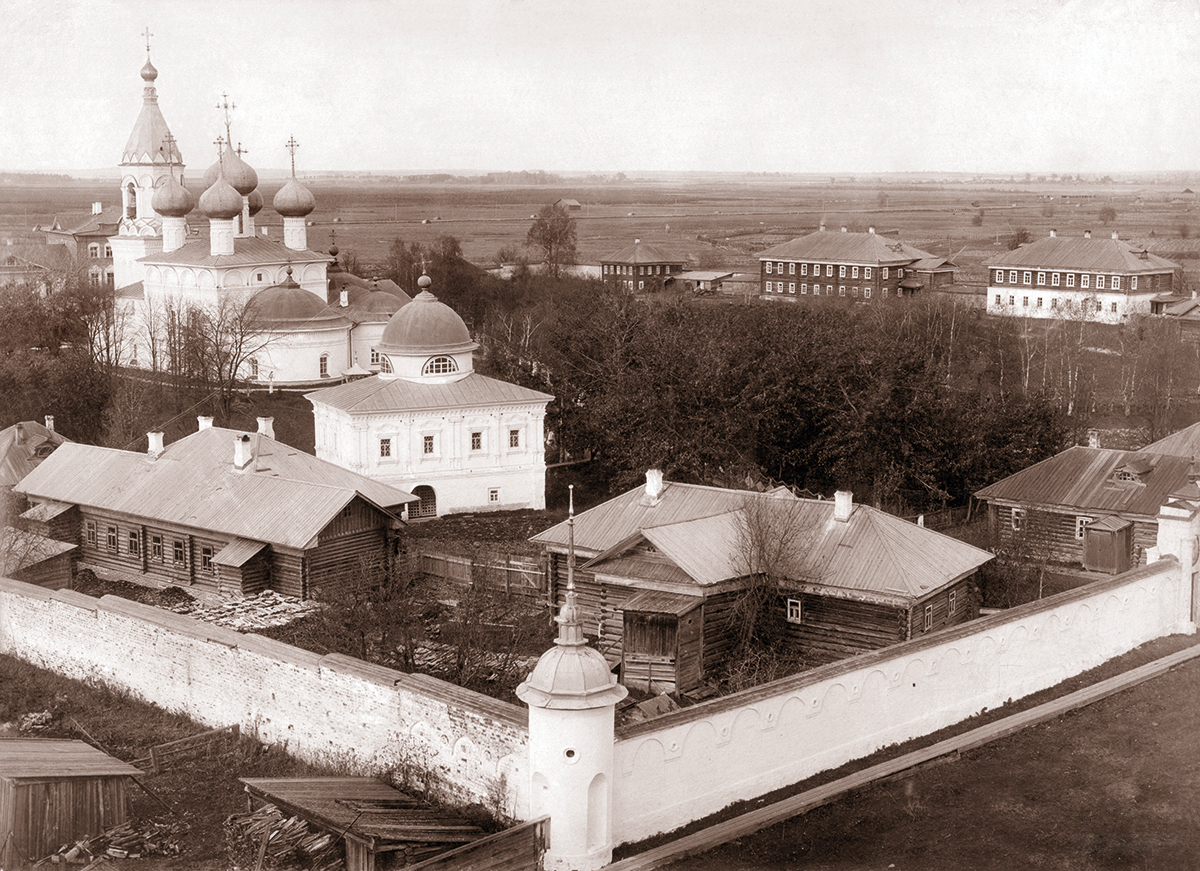
- Convent at the end of the 19th century
- Interactive map of Convent of the Assumption on the Hill

Monastery information
- Other name: Gorne-Uspensky Convent
- Order: Orthodox
- Established: 1590
- Disestablished: 1918
- Diocese: Vologda
- Controlled churches: Assumption church

People
- Founder: Abbess Domnikia

Site
- Location: Vologda, Russia
- Coordinates: 59°13′54″N 39°52′14″E
- Visible remains: Assumption church, stone walls, St Sergius chapel, Alexius barbican church, abbey house, orphanage

The Gorne-Uspensky Convent (Russian: Горне-Успенский монастырь) or simply Gorny Convent (in English: Convent of the Assumption on the Hill) is a monastery in Vologda, Russia. It was active between 1590 and 1924. It is situated in the historic part of the town, named Upper Posad, in the area bounded by the Zavrazhskaya, Burmaginy and Mokhov streets. Several of its buildings are preserved or have been restored, while others are partially or completely in ruins. It comprises a complex of monuments that have been protected by the federal government.

== History ==
The convent received its name from its raised location and from the city's Cathedral of the Assumption.

The convent was established in 1590 by the Abbess Domnikia during the reign of Czar Feodor I and under the aegis of the Archbishop of Vologda, Iona Dumin. Domnikia was the first Mother Superior of the convent. The date of the convent's founding is based on two surviving letters, one of them a petition from 1613 from an abbess of the convent to the Archbishop Sylvester.

The first stone building in the convent was a single-storeyed hospice, constructed in the second half of the 17th century. Between 1692 and 1699, the Assumption church was constructed with a belfry, as well as the winter chapel of St Sergius of Radonezh. From 1709 to 1714, the Barbican church of Alexius was built. Afterward, in the 1790s, a stone wall with four towers at the corners was built to surround the convent.

In 1792, a fire destroyed all the wooden structures within the convent. Many documents were destroyed too, which is why there is insufficient information on the history of the convent before the 19th century.

In 1824, Czar Alexander I visited the convent. With his financial support, a two-storeyed structure was constructed.

In 1860, the Holy Synod of the Russian Orthodox Church decreed that the Nikolaevsky-Ozersky church (previously attached to the eponymous monastery) be assigned to the Assumption convent.

Between 1870 and 1890, an orphanage and a women's religious school were constructed. To the end of the 19th century, the convent remained a place of exile for women convicted of prostitution or adultery.

In 1880, the bell tower was rebuilt.

In 1888, the bishop Theodosius converted a shelter in the convent to a diocesan school for girls, which in 1903 moved to new outside premises.

In 1918, the convent was closed, but several nuns remained till 1923–1924, when it was commandeered by the Red Army. The Assumption church remained in use till 1924. After their eviction, some of the nuns moved into homes next to the convent. In the Soviet period, the monastery housed a transit prison and a cantonment.

1995 saw the restoration of the Assumption church, and services began the following year. The abbot's residence and the convent's sanctuary now house shops and warehouses.

On November 15, 2014, after the all-night vigil in the Dormition Church, Metropolitan Ignatius (Deputаtov) of Vologda and Kirillov, inspected the two-storey building preserved in the territory of the assumption parish. During the inspection of the building and assessment of its safety and suitability for living of nuns, he decided to reestablish the Gorne-Uspensky convent in the status of the Bishop's metochion. During the year, the former hegumen corps was prepared for the residence of the sisters of the monastery and the placement in it of the Regent's Department of the Vologda Theological Seminary. On December 24, 2015, the Holy Synod of the Russian Orthodox Church decided to open a monastery and appoint a nun Philareta (Dorokhina) to the post of abbess.

After the revival of the monastery, several rooms of the cell building were overhauled, part of the roof of the old building was renewed, a monastery subsidiary farm was created, iconography and sewing were developed.

== Church of the Assumption ==
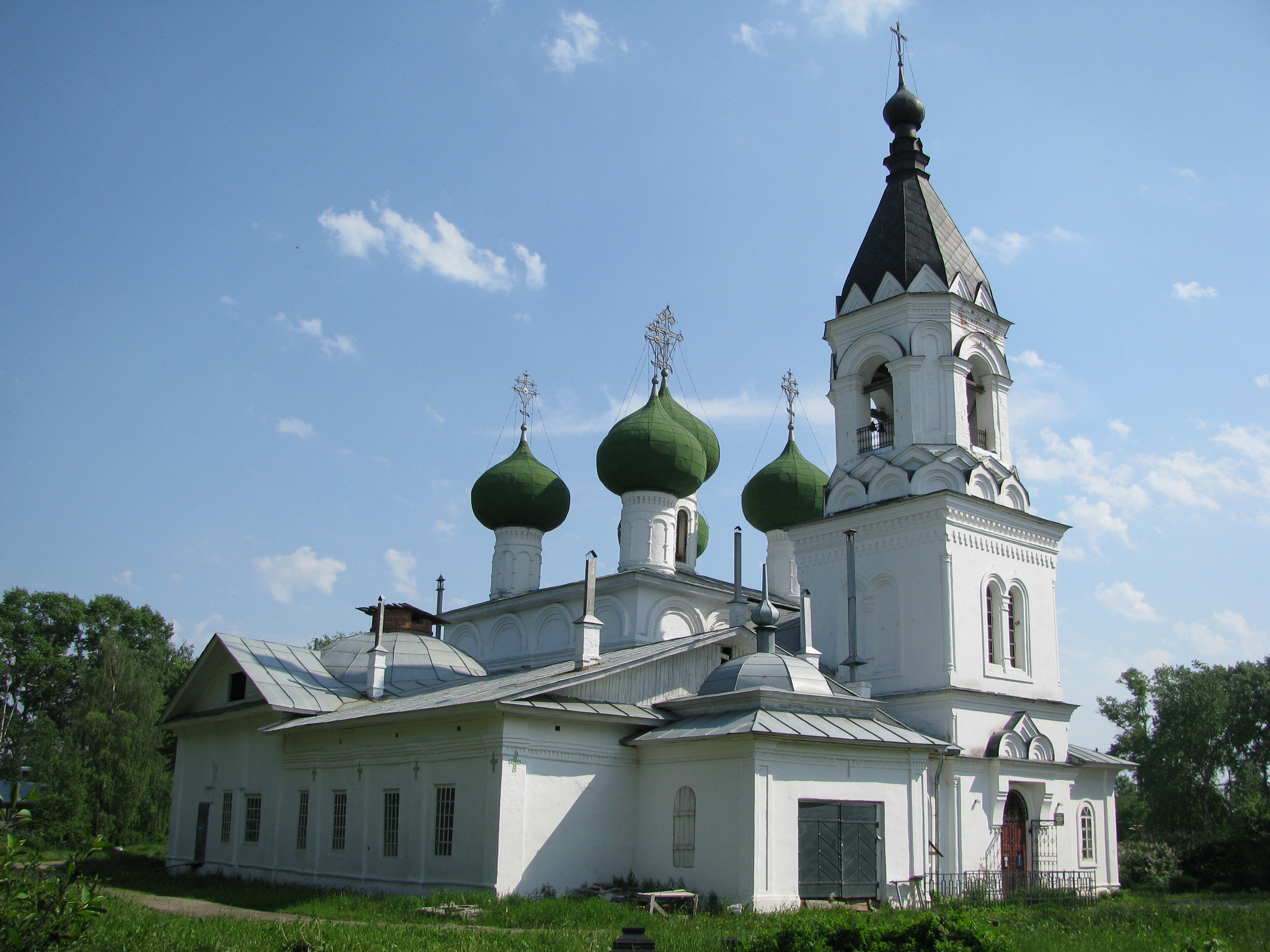
Assumption cathedral, view from the side of the belltower and the chapel of St Sergiius (2009)

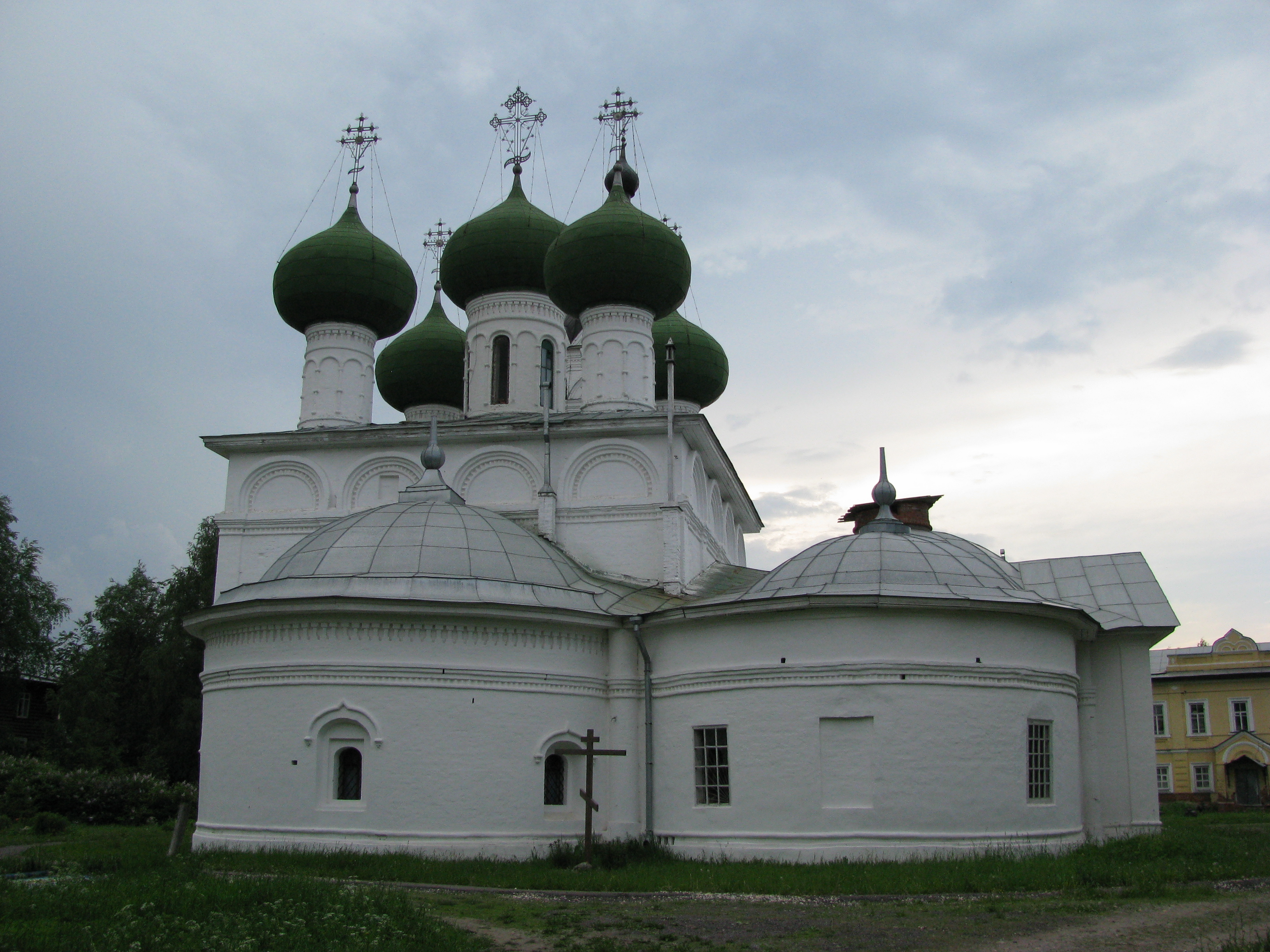
Apse of the Assumption cathedral and St Sergius chapel (2009)

The Church of the Assumption which gave its name to the convent was constructed and consecrated significantly earlier than the convent. The first church was wooden, one of the oldest buildings in Vologda. In 1303, during the feast of the Assumption, Theoctist, bishop of Novgorod, consecrated a Church of Our Lady in Vologda. Evidently, in 1499, this ancient church burned to the ground, with its icons and manufactures, its books and indeed the entire monastery. The reference to monastery here likely means some chambers that existed at the church - although, these were not officially monastic. In the place of the burned building, another wooden church was constructed. This, in turn, was replaced by a stone edifice, which then became the monastery's church.

The stone church of the Assumption with a bell tower was unheated, so a warm winter chapel of St Sergius of Radonezh was built between 1692 and 1699 in place of two older wooden structures. In 1691, the foundations were laid, and the next year saw the start of the construction of the buildings, which finished in 1694. On May 23, 1695, Archbishop Gabriel of Vologda and Belozero consecrated the church.

The crosses atop the church cupolas were gilded. It is known that the church was called Golden cross. The neighbouring church of Nicholas the Miracle-Worker on the Hill was also called the Golden cross, but it is evident from archive documents of the first half of the 18th century that the Nicholas church was referred to as by the Golden cross - in other words, it was located not far from the Assumption church. In 1761, a fire badly damaged the body and roof of the Assumption church, and it lost its gilt. As a result, the name Golden cross was transferred to the Nicholas church.

From the outside, the Assumption church resembles an ordinary shrine rather than a monastic cathedral. Its architecture is based on 16th century traditional styles. The main part of the building has a cubical form, crowned with one illuminated and four decorative drums decorated with arcature and bearing large onion cupolas. The decor of the facades is simple: plain cornices and mouldings and window-jambs on rollers.

In 1880, the chapel, refectory and bell-tower were rebuilt in a pseudo-Russian style.

In mid-July 1924, the cathedral was taken over by the signal corps of the Ensky division. On July 26, the first moving picture presentation for the Red Army was held here.

The Assumption church along with the chapel of St Sergius of Radonezh are protected architectural buildings. Currently, it is restored and in active use. It constitutes a single parish along with the church of Saints Constantine and Helena.

=== Icons of the Assumption Church ===
At the time of its closing, the Assumption church had a carved five-tier iconostasis in gilt.

There are two prominent icons in this church - the Assumption of the Holy Mother, and Resurrection-Descent into Hell, both from the 16th century and of local origin. After the closure of the church, the icons were transferred to the Vologda State Historical-Architectural and Art Museum.

The icon of the Assumption was transferred to the Assumption cathedral from the prior wooden Assumption church, which had been constructed in place of the church that had burned down in 1499.

The collection of the Vologda State museum also contains early-18th century frames depicting the life of the Virgin in the style of Ivan Grigoryev-Markov's studio. This was renewed thrice and twice decorated with casings (first with an indigo-based dye and then with silver emboss), and restored in 1977 by N.I. Fedyshin.

It is also known that the Assumption cathedral contained old icons of the Saviour and of St Sergius of Radonezh.

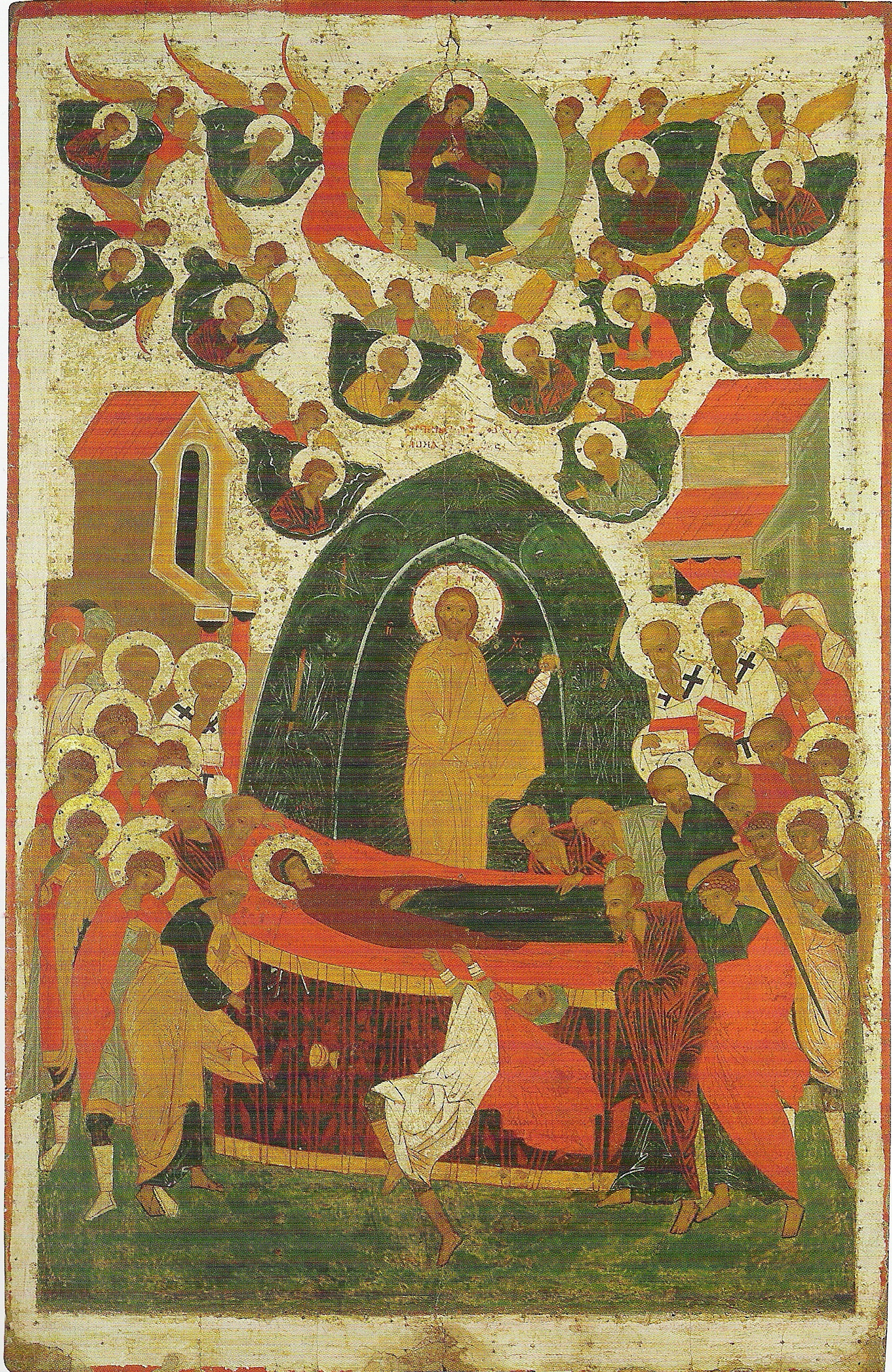
Assumption. First quarter of the 16th century. Vologda State Historical-Architectural and Art Museum

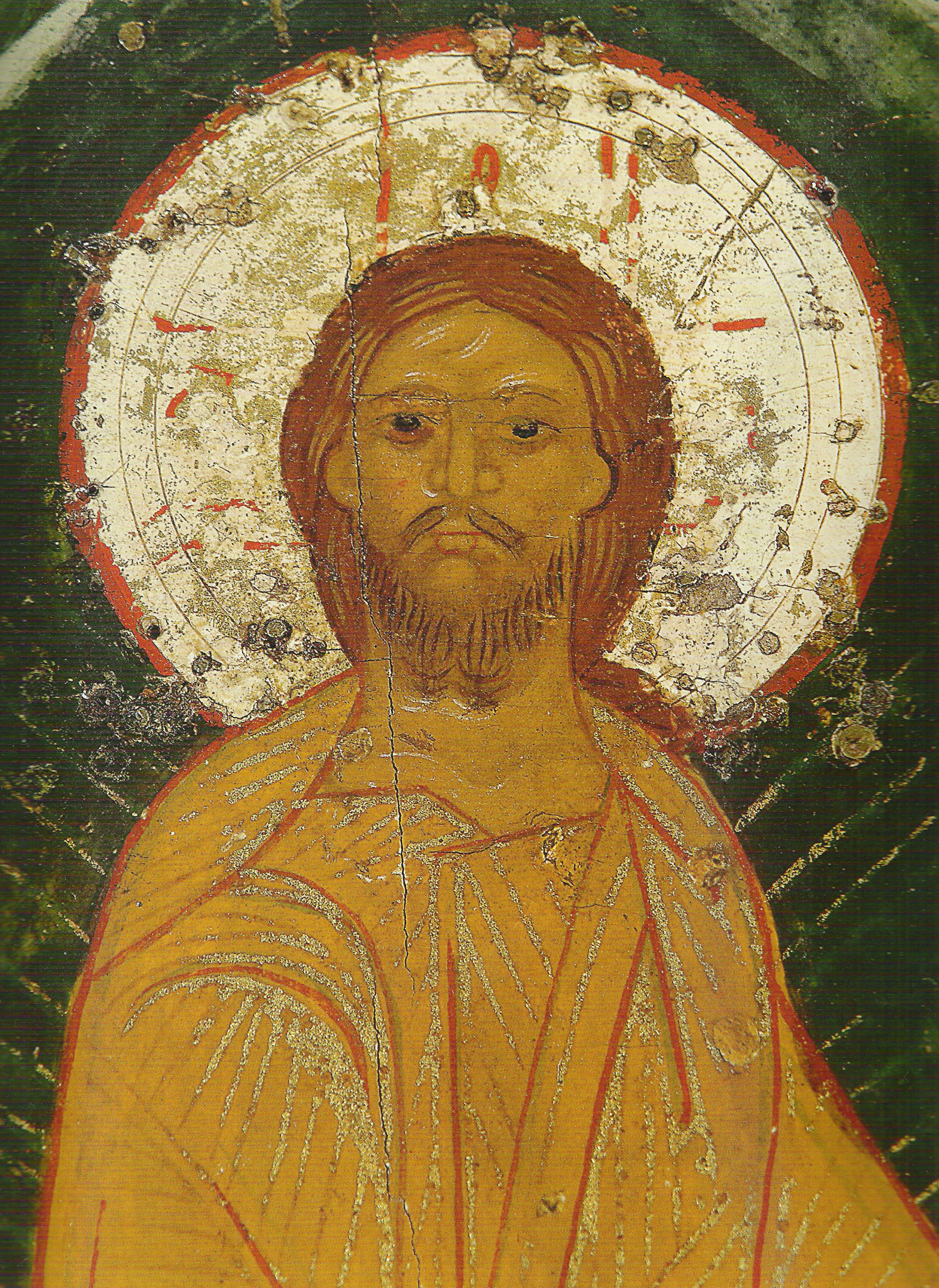
Assumption, fragment: Jesus. First quarter of the 16th century. Vologda State Historical-Architectural and Art Museum

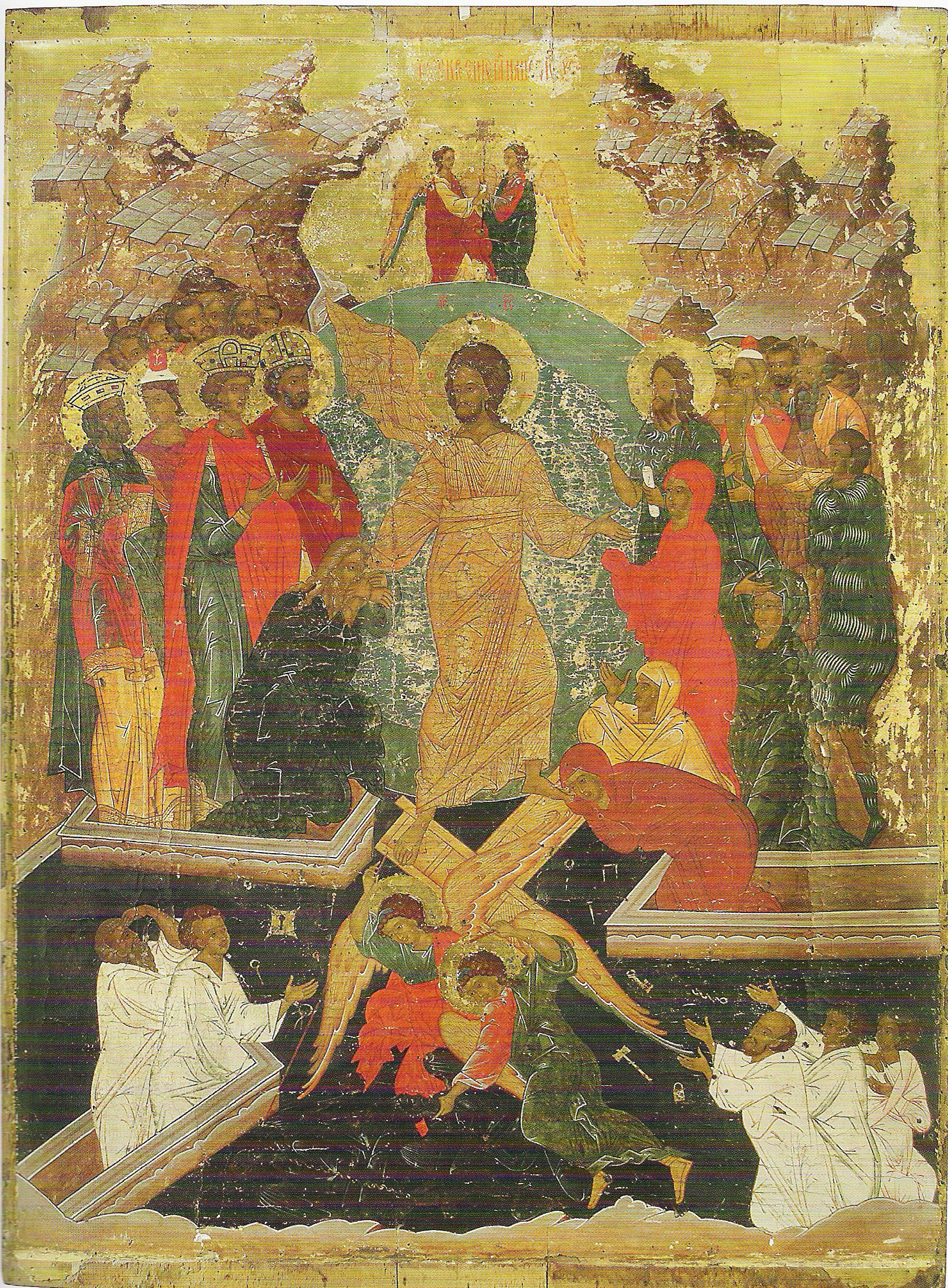
Resurrection - Descent into Hell. Second quarter of the 16th century. Vologda State Historical-Architectural and Art Museum

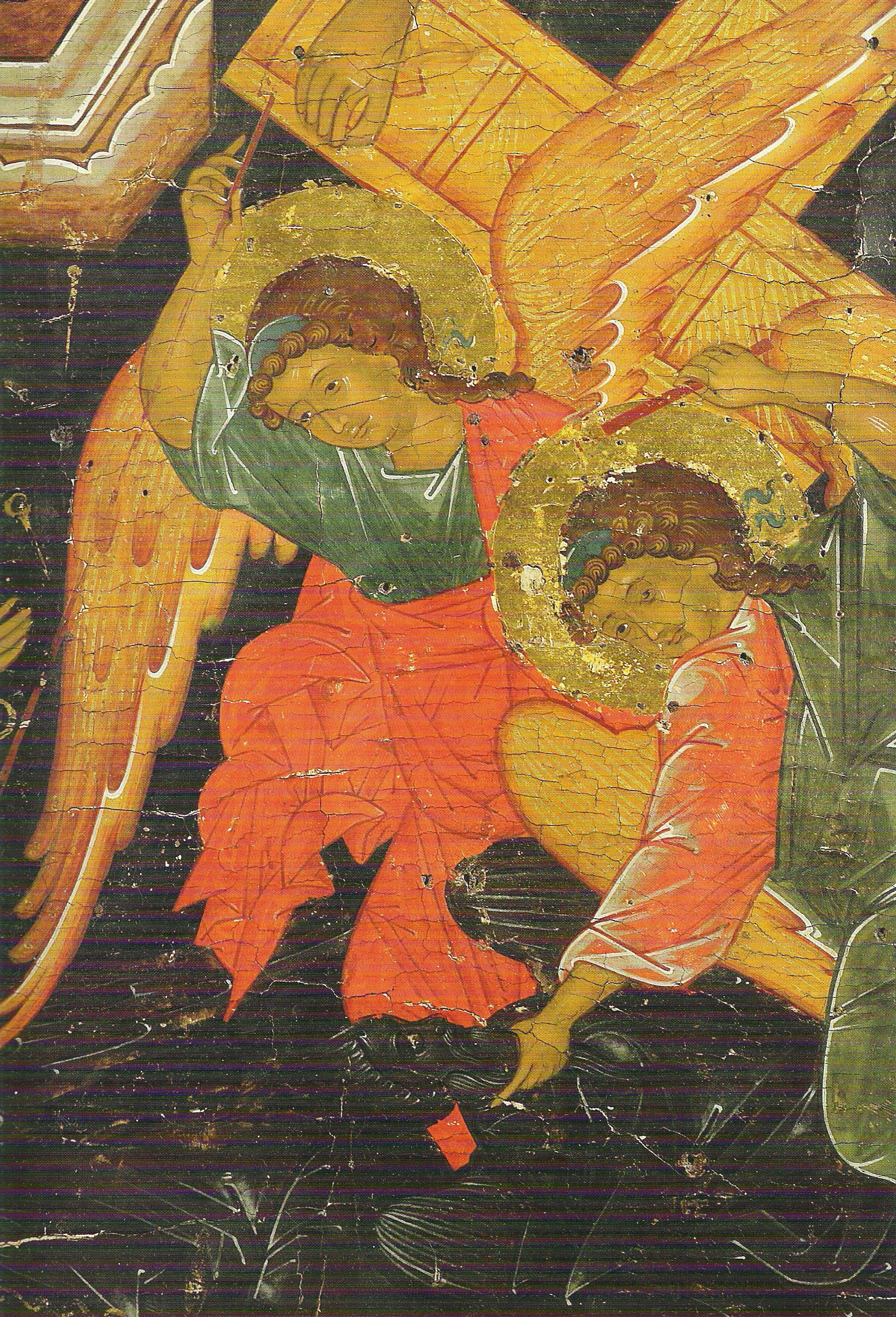
Resurrection - Descent into Hell, fragment: angels. Second quarter of the 16th century. Vologda State Historical-Architectural and Art Museum

=== The Chapel Of St. Sergius Of Radonezh ===
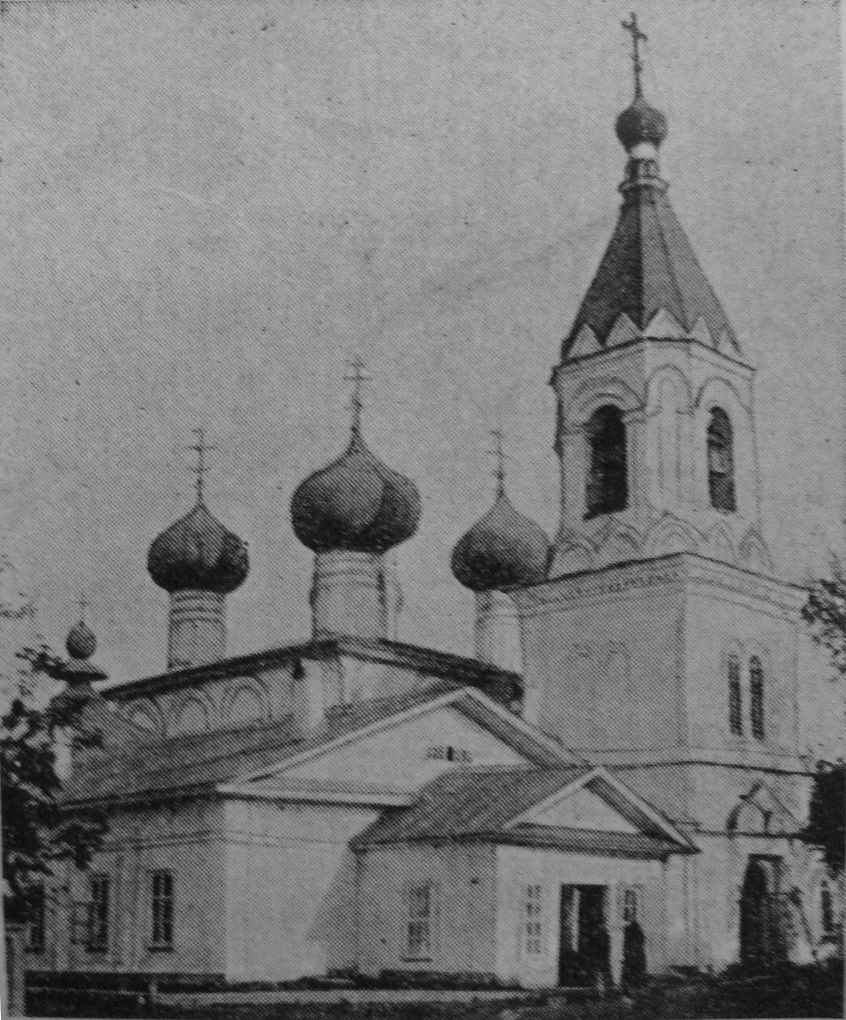
Assumption cathedral with the St Sergius chapel (1914). Behind the branches is the ruined chapel dome.

The warm chapel of St. Sergius of Radonezh is located on the northern side of the Assumption cathedral. Its construction began in 1692 and finished between 1697 and 1698. A journeyman builder named Vasily Karpov (nicknamed Vargan) with his son Dmitri and workers from the Spaso-Prilutsky Monastery of Kornovich village completed the chapel.

The chapel is single-storeyed, single-domed and has three altars. It has a refectory hall to the right of which is a shrine to Alexander Nevsky and the iconographer St Joseph, which was consecrated in 1712. On the left side of the refectory is a chapel of St Nicholas of Myra (who is mentioned in monastic records of 1634), consecrated in 1714.

=== Bell Tower ===
The convent's monastery was built at the end of the 17th century at the same time as the cathedral. It is tent-like in shape and attached to the cathedral.

In 1880, there was damage to the bell tower, and it was rebuilt. It is located on the western side at the entrance to the cathedral. It is a two-tiered structure that tapers to a tent-shaped top. The tower is about 36 metres tall. The belfry has ten bells, the heaviest weighing about 4 tons. On the second tier of the tower, a sacristy was constructed.

== The Alexius Barbican Church ==
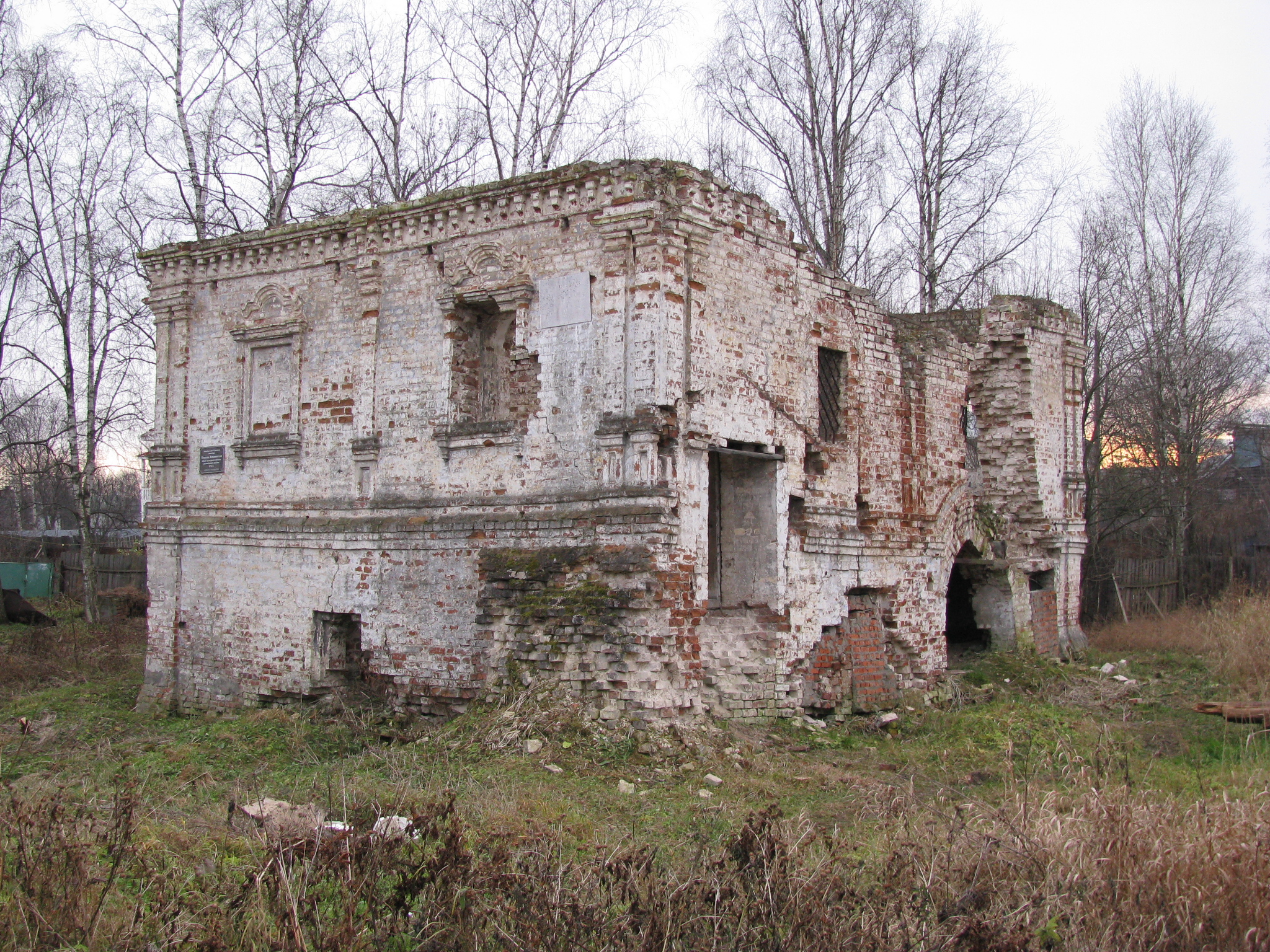
Barbican church of Alexius (2008)

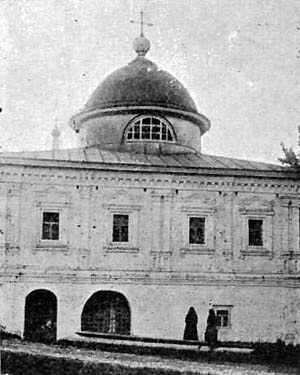
Church of Alexius (1914)

The Alexius barbican church, or the church of Alexius of Rome was built between 1709 and 1714, and consecrated in 1720. For its completion, the abbess and nuns had to go to Moscow and other towns to beg donations from the believers.

The barbican church was built of stone: unheated, single-storeyed, single-domed. Beneath it were the holy gates with two bays, one large and one small. At first, it was intended to sanctify two seats within the church: one in the name of St Nicholas, and the other for Alexius. The ground floor had no external decorations and was subsumed in the wall surrounding the convent. The upper level was occupied by the church. Its four windows lent it a residential appearance. The facade of the upper level was richly decorated with half-columns and architraves with Russian baroque gables, typically in the style of the early 18th century. The church's dome was made in the classical style.

Within the church was an ancient image of the Mandylion, featuring many saints. A two-tiered iconostasis, constructed at the same time as the church, is a protected historical treasure.

These days the church is in a dilapidated state.

== The Abbey House ==
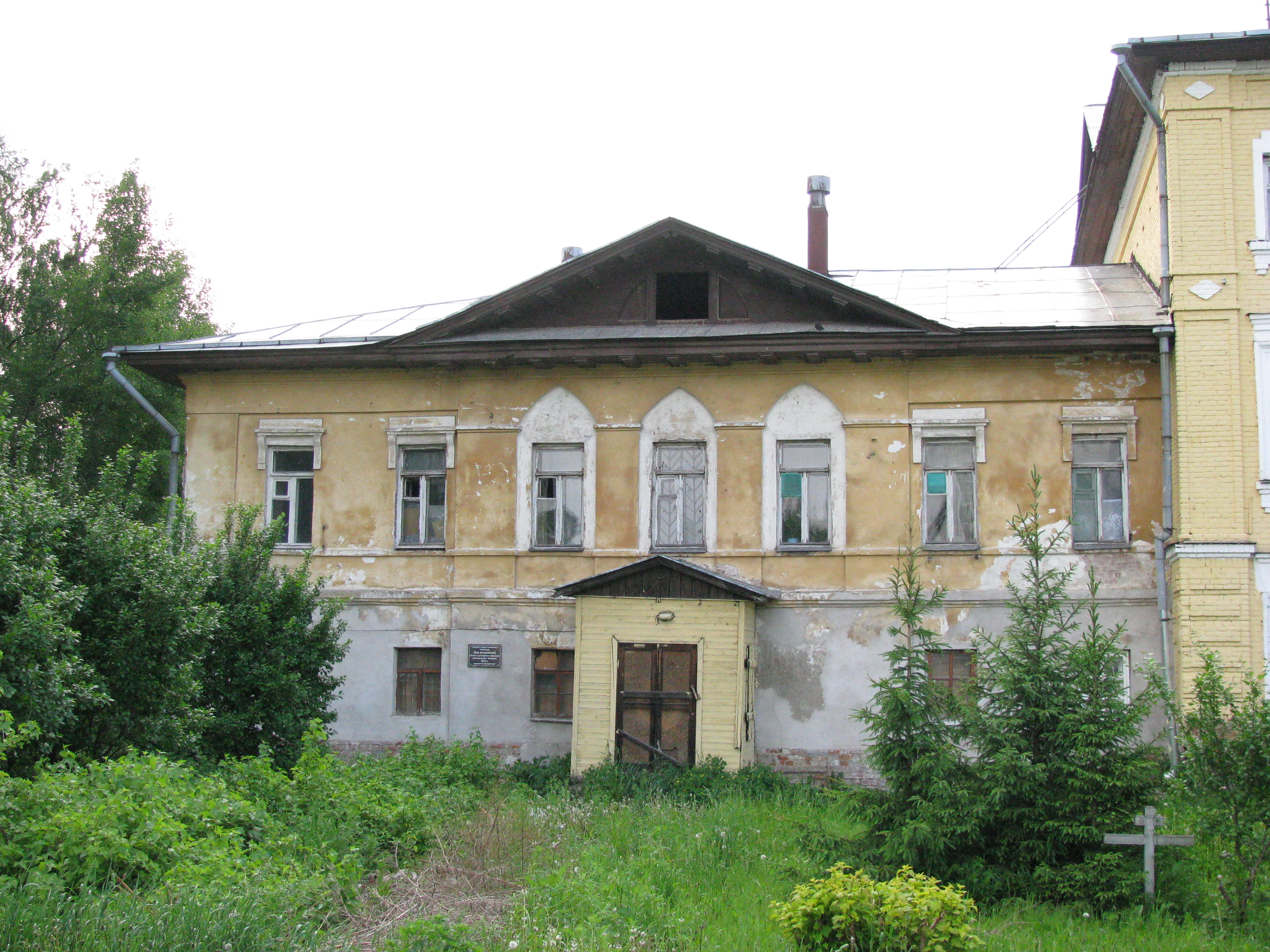
Modern view of the abbey house

The two-storeyed Abbey House was built between 1826 and 1828 with the financial support of Czar Alexander I, after his visit to the convent in October 1824. The Mother Superior's residence is a protected monument (currently uncategorized).

== Orphanage and School ==
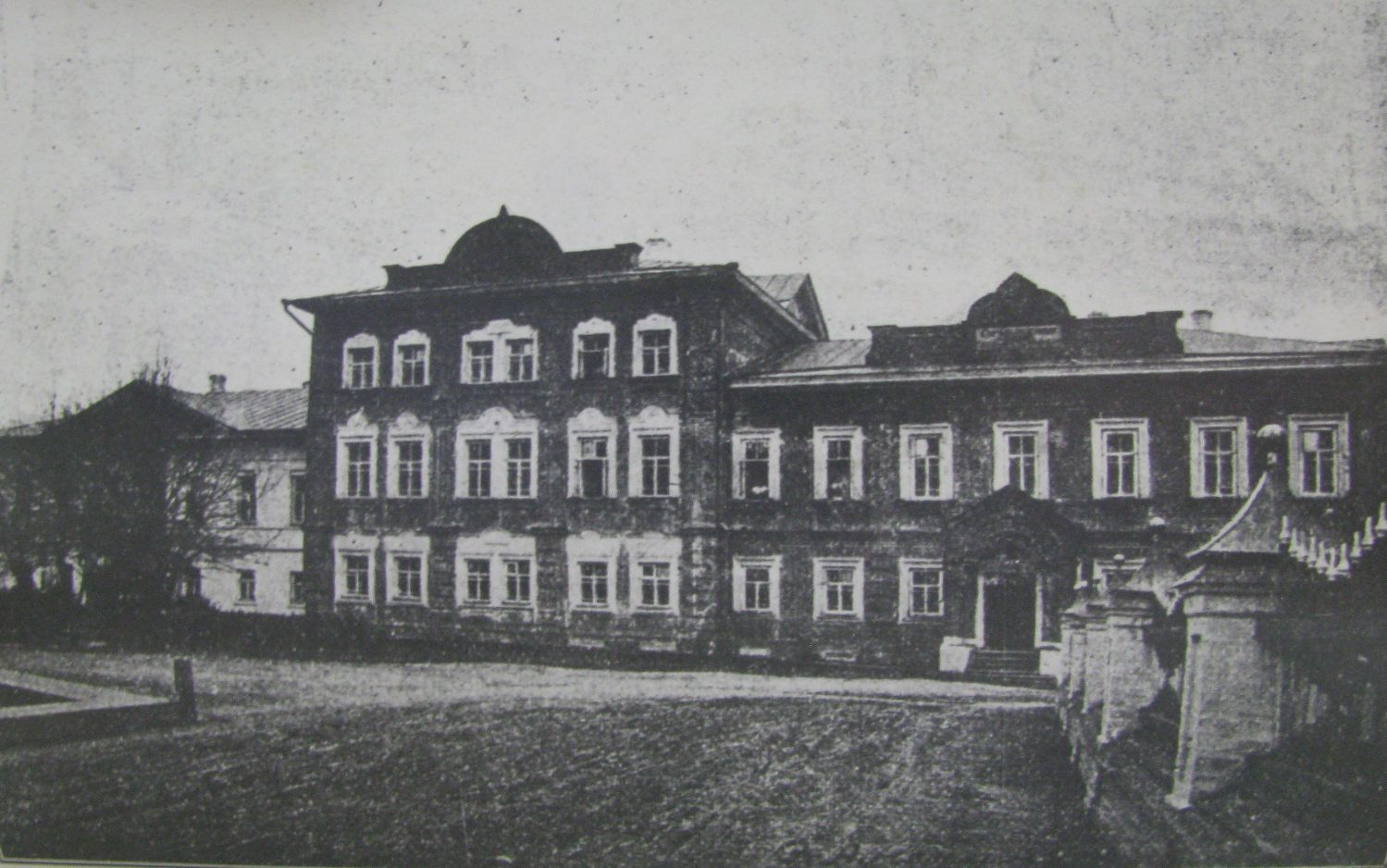
Women's school and abbey house. On the right is the stone wall. (1899)

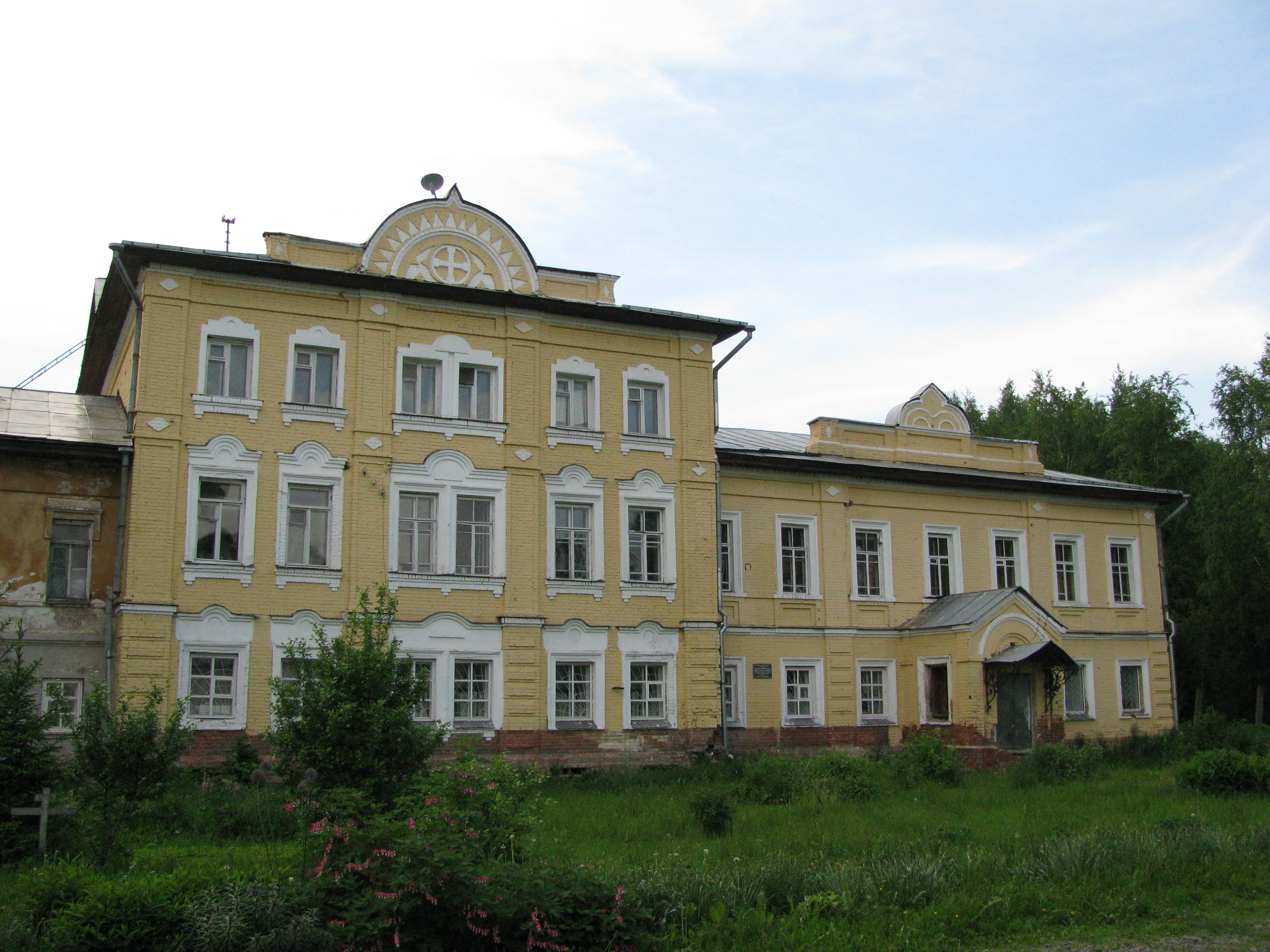
Modern appearance of the Vologda Parochial's Women's School

The idea for the school came from the Reverend Christopher on November 7, 1862. The orphanage came into being in 1869, when the abbess Sevastiana took in 10 girls, mostly orphans of the clergy, with the blessings of the Metropolitan Palladius.

At first, the orphanage was part of the abbey house, but soon thereafter it was decided to construct a separate two-storeyed building for it. Its foundations were laid on St Sergius of Radonezh's festival day, September 25, 1870. Construction began the following year and finished in 1873.

In the early 1880s, as the number of orphans increased, it was decided to merge the abbey house and the orphanage. A new three-storeyed wing was constructed to accommodate the population that was growing at forty-five children every year. The bishop Theodosius funded the extension with ten thousand rubles; later, he provided another 9,500 rubles for its improvement.

The full course of education at the orphanage was six years long: three classes, each over two years. The orphans were taught reading, writing, the holy law, the explanation of worship and service, arithmetic, sacred and secular history, Russian language, singing, crafts and geography. Between 1873 and 1888, one hundred and six girls graduated in seven cohorts.

In 1888, bishop Theodosius converted the orphanage to a diocesan school for girls. For its extension, Theodosius contributed twenty thousand rubles, and invested another ten thousand, the proceeds of which paid for the maintenance of the school. Graduates of the school received certificates that allowed them to become governesses or teachers, and half of them taught in parochial schools. Between 1902 and 1903, the school moved to new premises on the Zlatoustinsky embankment, and in its place a new orphanage was set up.

The orphanage is a protected architectural monument (currently uncategorized).

== Hospice ==
The Hospice is located northeast of the orphanage. It was constructed with part of the funds for the Bishop's house, under the aegis of Bishop Simon, who governed between 1664 and 1684. It was designed to provide shelter and treatment for twelve elderly and sickly women. The hospice was the first stone construction within the convent. In 1870, a second wooden floor was added to it, along with a wooden roof. From 1871, meals and the reading of the Psalms were held within it.

== Convent Walls ==
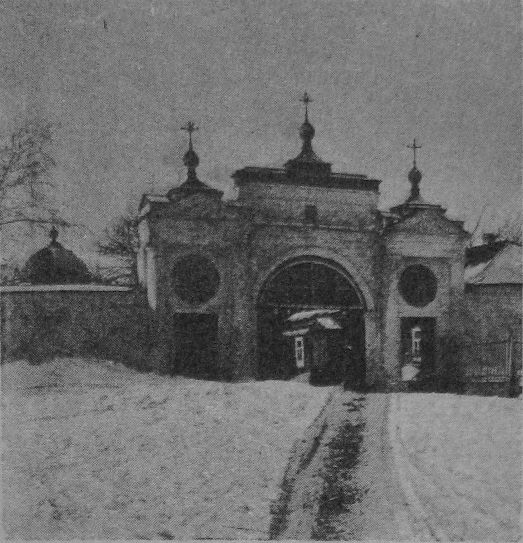
Holy Gate. Photo from the early 20th century. Destroyed in the Soviet period

To the end of the 1790s, the convent was surrounded by a wooden wall. In the 1890s, a new stone wall was built, complete with turrets at its four corners, and in circumference, considerably larger than the old wooden walls. It was about 3 metres tall, 780 metres long. There were two gates in the walls. The eastern, Sacred gates comprised two wings, decorated with round windows. The southern gate was a more modest affair for pedestrians.

== Other Buildings ==
The convent consists of several other buildings:

- A two-storeyed wooden house with a wooden roof. This housed the nuns and was located adjacent to the hospice. It was built in 1869.
- A single-storeyed wooden house with a wooden roof. This housed the nuns who were ill, and was located to the south of the abbey house. It was built in 1875 by N. N. Rataeva.
- Fifteen wooden cells, in which dwelt rassophores and novitiates.
- Two barns.
- Two cellars.
- A bath-house and laundry.
- A wooden mews with stables.

Besides these, the convent owned several other buildings outside its walls.

- A wooden cottage on a stone foundation with adjoining lands, purchased by the convent in 1875.
- A wooden one-storeyed house, donated to the convent by S. A. Zasetskaya, widow of a titular counsellor.

== Monastic Properties ==
The convent owned twelve thatched cottages in the Vologda and Gryazovets counties:

- Krestovka;
- Novokupka;
- Bolshaya Chetvert;
- Malaya Chetvert;
- Berezovka;
- Zaberezhitsa;
- Popadeyka;
- Lykusha;
- Cherepaniha;
- Chishenye;
- Besovskoye;
- Galino Chishenye.

The convent also owned 600 square sazhens of land in Gryazovets, donated in 1877 by the widow of Captain E. P. Ivanov, and land at the Nikolaevsky-Ozersky church.

== Nikolaevsky-Ozersky Church ==
In 1860, the Holy Synod decreed that in order to extend the resources of the convent, the Nikolaevsky-Ozersky church (which originally belonged to the eponymous monastery) be assigned to it. 73 dessiatins and 2041 square sazhens, as well as 4450 rubles donated by a former priest Alexander Sokolov, came to the convent along with the church.

== Abbesses of the Convent ==
The list includes time periods for which there are sources indicating the reign of one or another Mother Superior, with the gaps possibly filled by the same abbesses. There are several sources for this list.

- From 1590: Domnikia.
- To 1613: two abbesses: Eulampia and Govdela.
- 1613: Anisia.
- 1613 - 1623: Domnikia again.
- 1623 - 1624: Maryemyana.
- 1639 - 1644: Anna Levasheva.
- 1649 - 1658: Vera
- 1660 - 1673: Natalia
- 1677 - 1685: Catherine
- 1686 - 1688: Anisia Zueva
- In 1689: Agripina Berdyaeva - on transfer from the Pskov Elias Monastery
- 1690-1709: Catherine Luninskih, possibly in place of Eugenia in 1714
- 1710-1713: Eugenia
- In 1714: Athanasia
- 1721 -1722: Dosifea
- 1738 -1741: Arcadia Skvortsova
- 1742 -1746: Eudokia
- 1746 -1770: Arcadia
- 1770 - 1784: Araksana
- 1784 - 1786: Iroda
- 1787 - 1795: Anastasia
- 1795 - 1805: Dorothea
- 1805 - 1814: Theoctista
- 1814 - 1818: Eustolia
- 1818 - 1822: Mitropolia
- July 5, 1822 - 1839: Seraphima
- January 21, 1840 - 1844: Methodia
- August 13, 1844 - 1847: Euphrasia
- September 25, 1847 - December 17, 1848: Raisa
- February 2, 1848 - February 2, 1850: Solomia
- May 27, 1850 - November 22, 1856: Raisa again
- November 22, 1856 - June 7, 1857: Amphilogia
- June 7, 1857 - November 1, 1866: Smaragda
- October 31, 1866 - January 21, 1871: Sebastiana
- January 21, 1871 - June 4, 1871: Vitalia
- June 4, 1871 - December 27, 1893: Arsenia (Varvara Alexandrovna Yaryshkina)
- February 20, 1894 - 1904. Sergia.
