= Lisowczyks =

17th-century irregular unit of the Polish–Lithuanian light cavalry

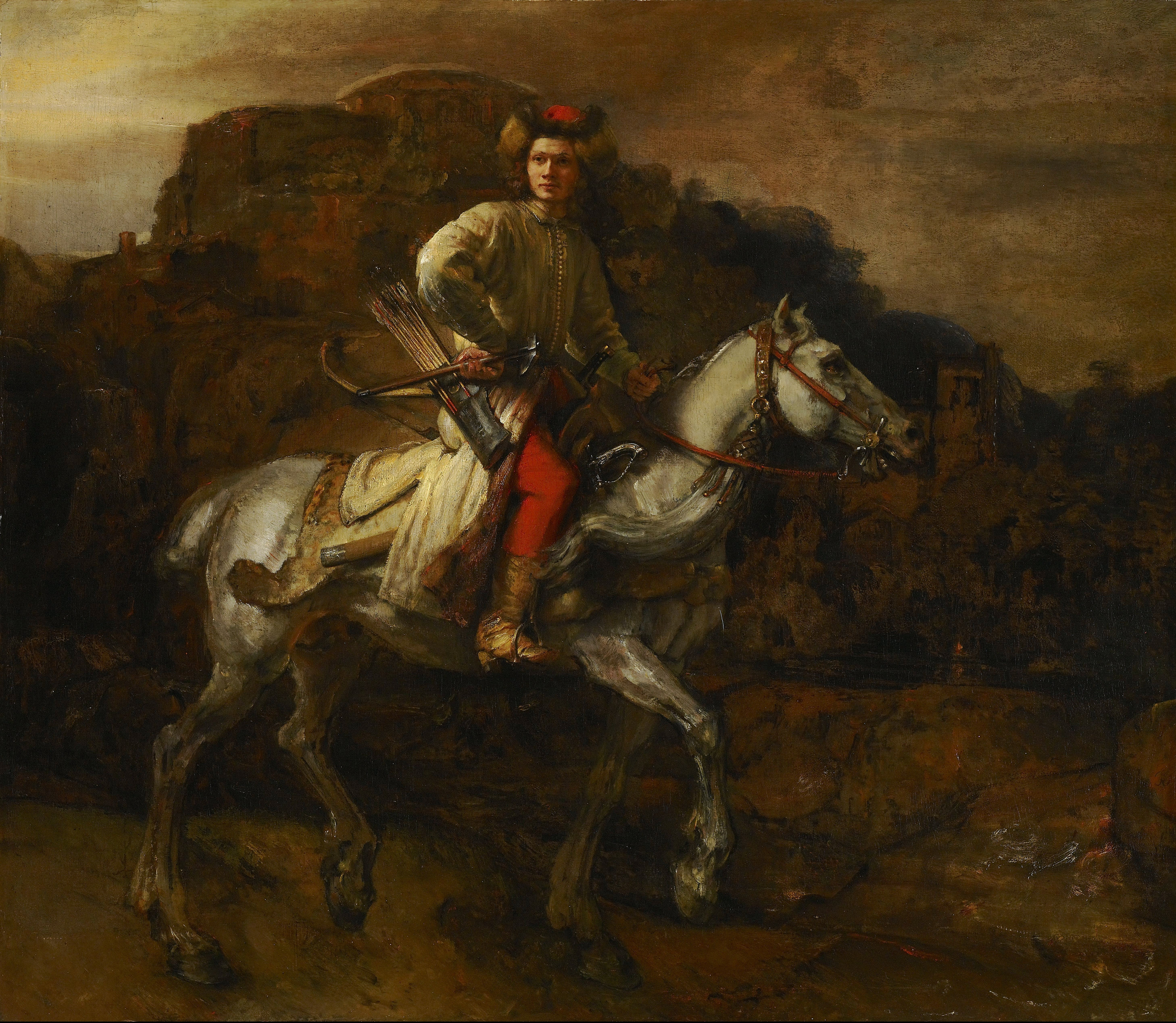
The Polish Rider by Rembrandt. A Lisowczyk may be the subject of one of the Dutch master's greatest works. Though the rider's identity is not known, one theory is that it is a portrait of Grand Chancellor of Lithuania Marcjan Aleksander Oginski, made in c.1655. It has little to do with the Lisowczycy, though much of the clothing and war gear would have been similar that worn by the real Lisowczyks of 30 years earlier.

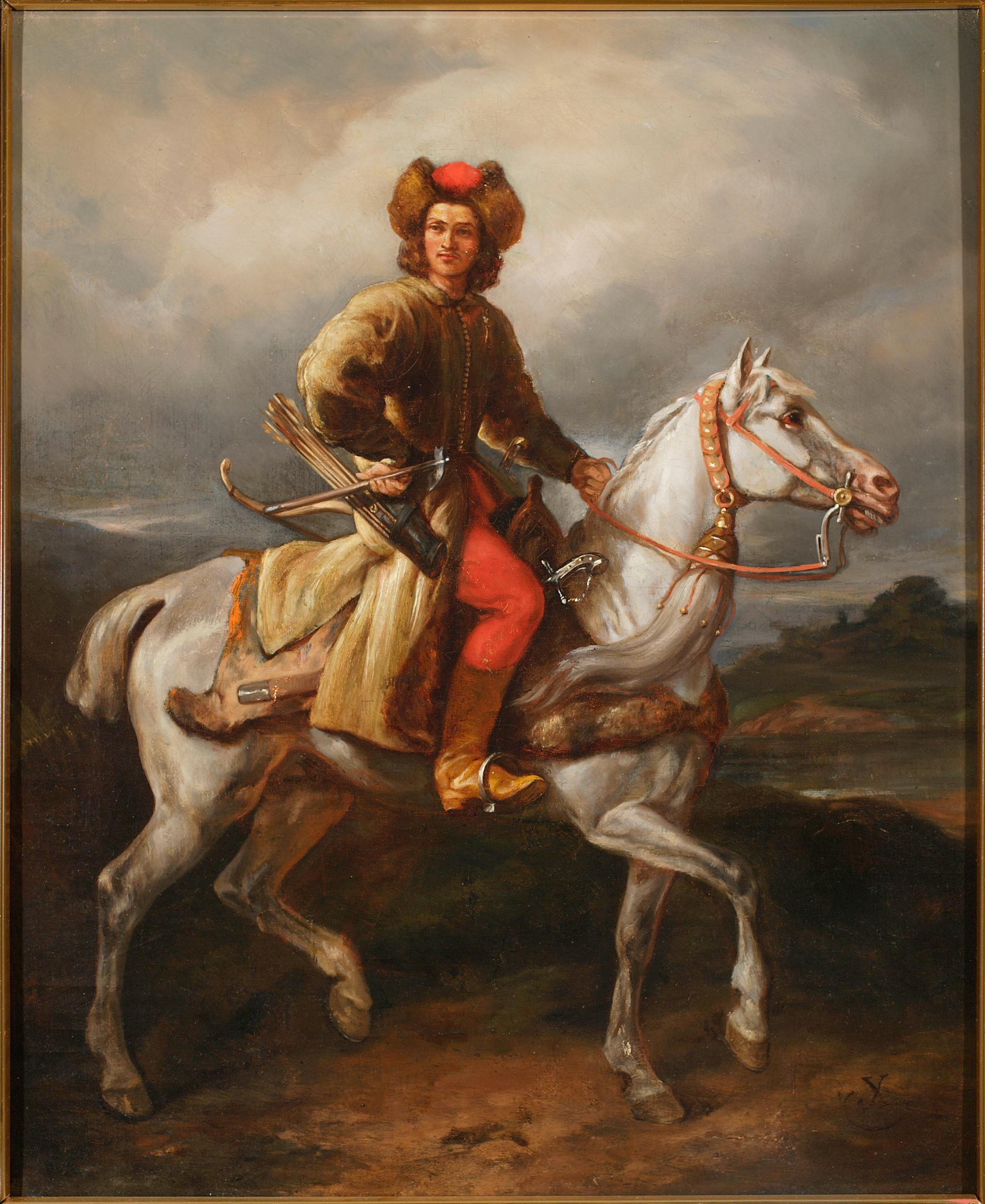
Lisowczyk – painting by Juliusz Kossak, circa 1860-65, after Rembrandt. National Museum in Warsaw.

Lisowczyks or Lisowczycy (Polish pronunciation: [lisɔfˈt͡ʂɨt͡sɨ]; also known as Straceńcy ('lost men' or 'forlorn hope') or chorągiew elearska (company of elears); or in singular form: Lisowczyk or elear) was the name of an early 17th-century irregular unit of the Polish–Lithuanian light cavalry. The Lisowczycy took part in many battles across Europe and the historical accounts of the period characterized them as extremely agile, warlike, and bloodthirsty. Their numbers varied with time, from a few hundred to several thousand.

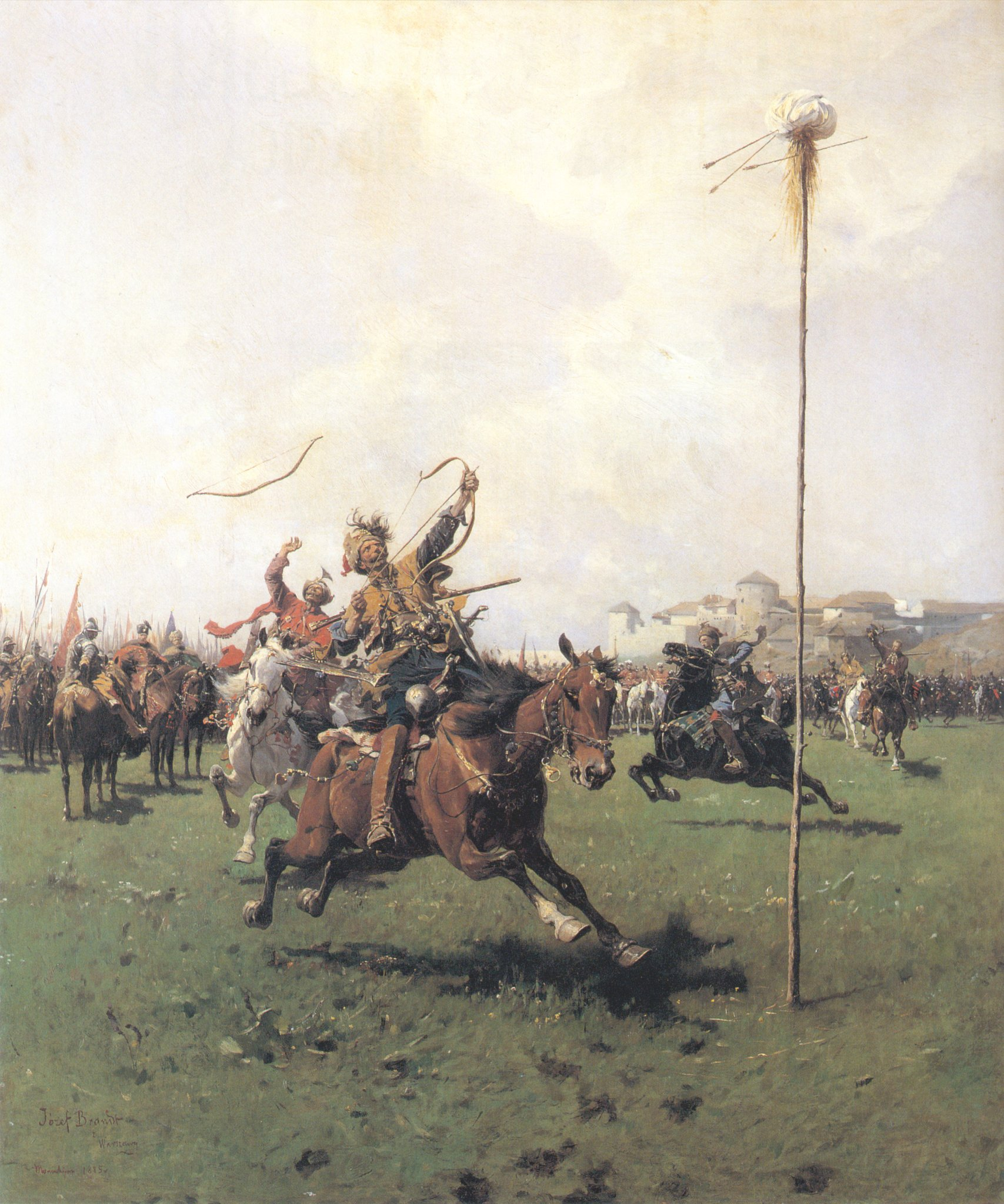
Lisowczycy (Archery) – painting by Józef Brandt, 1885, Kościuszko Foundation in New York

The origin of the group can be traced to konfederacja (a form of semi-legal mutiny of royal forces, practiced in the Kingdom of Poland and then in the Commonwealth), organized around 1604 by Aleksander Józef Lisowski. They began to grow in strength and fame a few years later, when Lisowski's irregulars were incorporated into the forces fighting in Muscovy. The Lisowczycy unit of the Polish cavalry received no formal wages; instead, they were allowed to loot and plunder as they pleased. They relied on their speed and fought without tabors, foraging supplies from lands they moved through. The Lisowczycy were feared and despised by civilians wherever they passed and they gained dubious fame for the scores of atrocities they carried out (pillage, rape, murder, and other outrages). However, they were also grudgingly respected by their opponents for their military skills. They did not hesitate to plunder even their homeland, where they sacked the Racovian Academy university of the Polish Brethren. Such actions were among the reasons the Commonwealth ruler Sigismund III Vasa tried to keep them away from the Commonwealth for as long as possible.

The Lisowczycy took part in many conflicts, including the Dymitriads (where their actions help explain the text of the infamous placard in Zagorsk: three plagues: typhus, Tatars, and Poles), the Battle of Humenné (where they prevented a Transylvanian army from laying siege to Vienna), and in the Battle of White Mountain (where they participated in Bohemia's defeat). They were eventually disbanded in 1635.

An account of Lisowczycy's exploits was written by their chaplain, Wojciech Dembołęcki (or Wojciech Debolecki), in Przewagi Elearów polskich co ich niegdy Lisowczykami zwano (1619–1623) (Deeds of Polish Elears once known as Lisowczycy (1619–1623)).

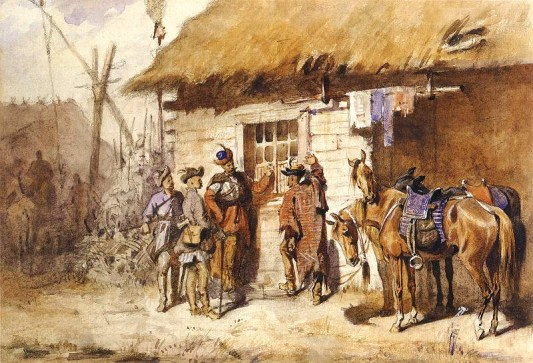
Lisowczycy at the inn – painting by Józef Brandt

== Prologue: the konfederacja ==
In 1604, during the early stages of the Polish–Swedish War, the Sejm of the Commonwealth failed to gather the money to pay its soldiers fighting in Livonia against the Swedes. Aleksander Józef Lisowski became one of the leaders of the resulting konfederacja – a section of the army that mutinied and decided to gather its outstanding wages by pillaging local civilians, not caring whether these owed their allegiance to the Commonwealth or to Sweden. Although this annoyed Great Hetman of Lithuania Jan Karol Chodkiewicz, and resulted in Lisowski being banished from the Commonwealth, little was done to stop the mutineers. Soon after, Lisowski with his followers joined the Sandomierz rebellion or rokosz of Zebrzydowski, a revolt against the absolutist tendencies of the King Sigismund III Vasa.

== Trial of Blood: the Dymitriad ==
Eventually, after the rebel forces were defeated at the Battle of Guzow, Lisowski's fortunes turned for the worse and he became persona non grata in most of the Commonwealth, and was forced to seek refuge with the powerful Radziwiłł family. In the meantime, Muscovy's Time of Troubles were brewing, and Lisowski did not pass over the opportunity of profiting from this, as many other local magnates and noblemen already had, by meddling in Russian affairs. He soon decided he could profit best by lending his support to the Muscovite pretender, False Dmitriy II.

In 1608, together with Aleksander Kleczkowski, leading his forces – a band of few hundred ragtag soldiers of fortune, mainly Poles, but also Lithuanians and Ruthenians – he defeated the armies of tsar Vasili Shuisky, led by Zakhary Lyapunov and Ivan Khovansky, near Zaraysk and captured Mikhailov and Kolomna, moving on to blockade Moscow. However, he was soon to be defeated at Miedźwiedzi Bród, losing most of his loot. He reorganized the army and joined with Jan Piotr Sapieha, but they failed to capture the Troitse-Sergieva Lavra fortress and were forced to retreat to near Rakhmantsevo. Then came successful pillages at Kostroma, Soligalich, and some other cities (those battles took place around 1608–09). He took Pskov in 1610 and clashed with Swedes operating in Muscovy during the Ingrian War. The Lisowczycy proved essential in the defence of Smolensk in 1612, when most of the Commonwealth regular army, the (wojsko kwarciane), mutined and joined the Rohatyn Confederation. For the next three years Lisowski's forces were of importance in the guarding of the Commonwealth border against Muscovy incursions. In 1615, Lisowski gathered many outlaws and invaded Muscovy with six companies of cavalry. He besieged Bryansk and defeated the Muscovite relief force of a few thousand soldiers under Kniaz Yuri Shakhovskoy near Karachev. Lisowski moved on to defeat the Muscovite advance guard of a force (several times larger than his) under the command of Kniaz Dmitry Pozharsky, who decided not to attack and fortified his forces inside a camp. Lisowski's men broke contact with other forces, burned Belyov and Likhvin, took Peremyshl, turned north, defeated a Muscovite army at Rzhev, turned towards the Kara Sea coast, then to Kashin, burned Torzhok, returned to Commonwealth without any further contact with Muscovy forces. Until the autumn of 1616, Lisowski and his forces remained on the Commonwealth-Muscovy border, when Lisowski suddenly fell ill and died on October 11.

== Lisowski's soldiers in Northern Russia (1612–1613) ==
In 1612, when the Polish occupation of the Moscow Kremlin had ended (see Polish–Muscovite War (1605–18)), loose Polish forces, which had fought under Lisowski, scattered over vast territory of the Tsardom of Russia, taking advantage of the so-called Time of Troubles. Exact whereabouts of Aleksander Jozef Lisowski at that time are unknown: the legendary leader most likely roamed across northern Russia, together with his men.

After Russian recapture of Moscow, most of the Polish brigands headed to the area of Vologda. On September 22, 1612, the town was captured, looted, and burned by the invaders commanded by Colonel Andrzej Nalewajko, who returned in December 13 of the same year. On December 16, Poles burned the Spaso-Prilutsky Monastery, located near Vologda.

On July 10, 1612, Poles captured Belozersk without fight. The town was looted, and its governor fled to Kirillov, hiding in the fortified Kirillo-Belozersky Monastery. Lisowski's men reached the monastery on August 20, but its siege did not begin until December 1612. Since Polish brigands, numbered at some 3000 men, did not have any artillery, they failed to capture the abbey with its stone walls.

On December 12–15, 1612, a unit of Bobowski three times tried to capture the town of Kargopol, located on the left bank of the Onega River. On January 25, 1613, Poles led by Jakub Jacki attacked the town of Veliky Ustyug, but without success.

In search of food and booty, Lisowski's soldiers moved further northwards, reaching as far as Yemetsk on the Yemtsa River, Solvychegodsk, Kholmogory, and Arkhangelsk. Solvychegodsk was captured and looted on January 22, 1613. The brigands stayed in the town for three days, and then headed towards Yemetsk, which is located 150 kilometers from Arkhangelsk. Its residents, aware of the danger, managed to fortify the town and arm themselves. The "Lithuanians", as they were commonly called, tried to attack the town from the Northern Dvina, but were repelled. A battle ensued, in which two Russian traitors were captured, and sent to Kholmogory, where they warned residents of a planned attack.

The brigands, numbering some 1200 and commanded by Stanislaw Jasinski, appeared at Kholmogory on December 6, 1613. Again, they failed to capture the town, and decided to head to Arkhangelsk, which they unsuccessfully besieged between December 14–19, 1613. Jasinski and his soldiers then marched towards the Northern Dvina estuary and the White Sea shore. There, they captured Severodvinsk and burned the Nikolo-Korelsky Monastery, after which they ransacked local villages, reaching as far as Karelia.

== Death of Lisowski, birth of the Lisowczycy ==
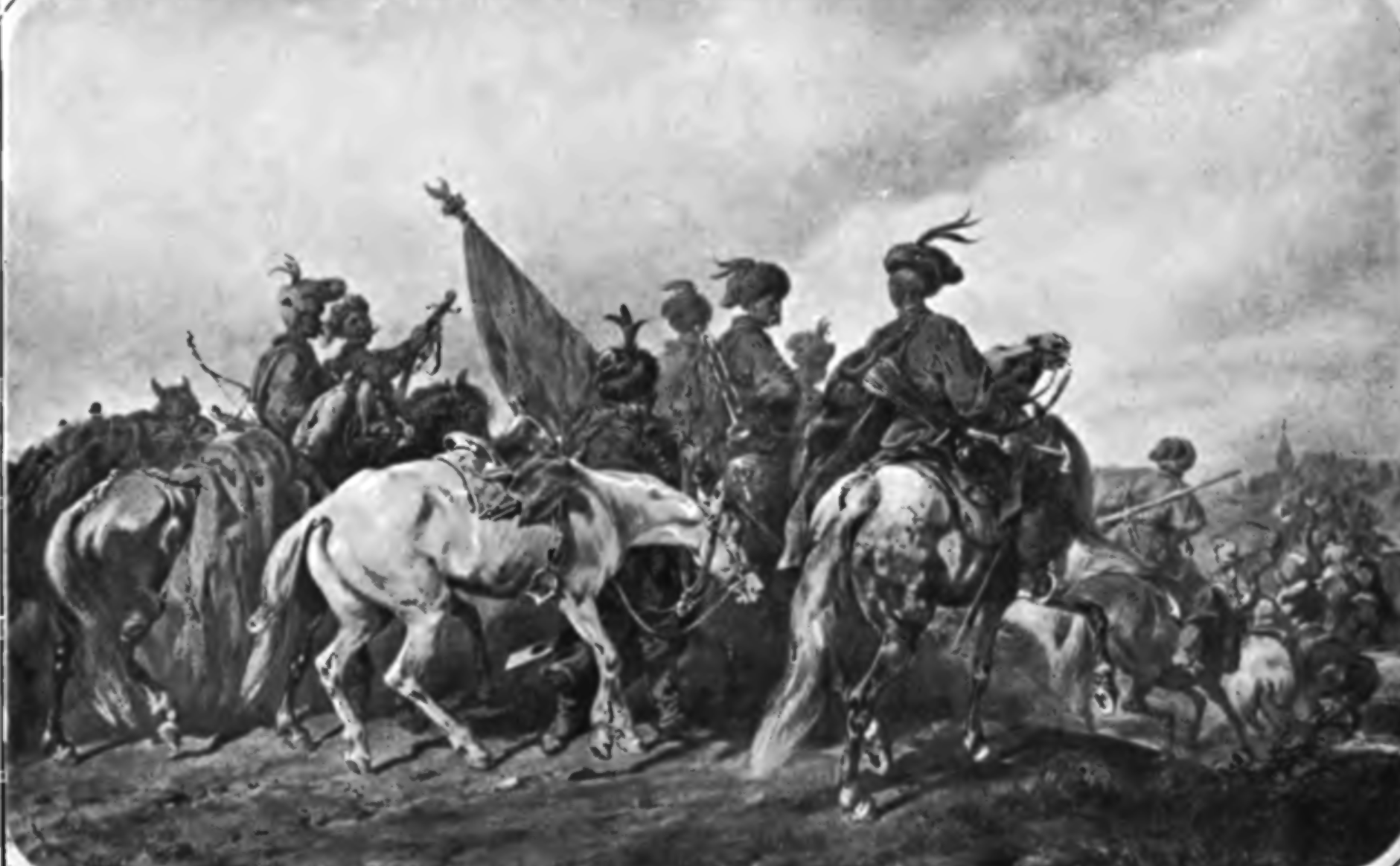
Lisowczycy on the Rhein River

The name of Lisowczycy was carried by the troops ever since Lisowski's passing. Despite his death, they remained a most significant threat: in 1616 they captured Kursk and defeated Russian forces at Bolkhov, in 1617 relieved Smolensk from a Muscovite siege – the invading troops retreated to Bely as soon as they received news that the Lisowczycy, then under the command of Stanisław Czapliński, were in the neighbourhood. When Czapliński died at Kaluga, Lisowczycy elected Walenty Rogowski for the new commander. They accompanied Władysław's forces in 1617, and while he retreated, they are said to have moved inland as far as the Ob River, where they were shown to have been impressed by a giant golden statue (possibly a Buddha, but also attachable to the Zlota Baba myth).

== Devils in the Holy Empire ==
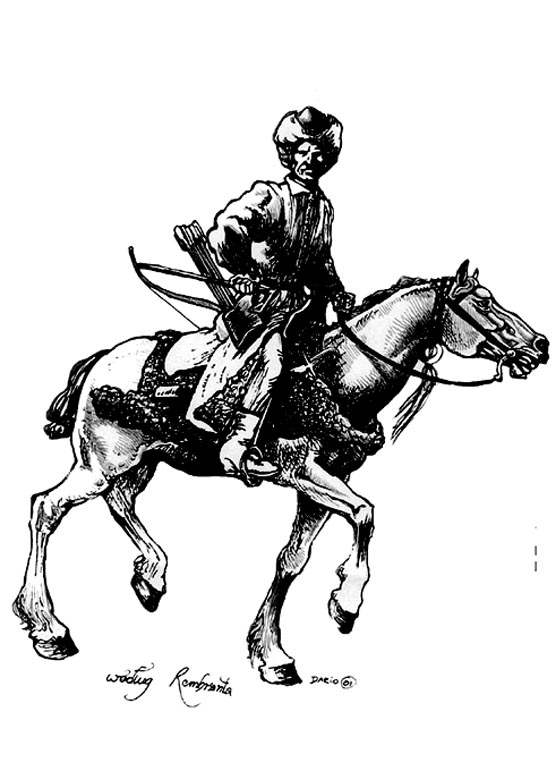
Lisowczyk. Another modern impression, after Rembrandt's famous picture. Painting by Dariusz T. Wielec.

From 1619, the Lisowczycy, then stationed near Kaunas (Kowno) were sent by Sigismund III Vasa to aid Ferdinand II, Holy Roman Emperor against the Protestants in the Thirty Years' War. Under the command of Walenty Rogowski, they defeated Transylvanian forces under George I Rákóczi at the Battle of Zavada and/or Battle of Humenné in November of that year. After the victory, they engaged in their traditional pastime (as they were not paid and they were obliged to gain everything by their own), plundering nearby lands, 'killing even children and dogs', as contemporary chroniclers recorded. It was around that time that they gained their new nickname: Riders of the Apocalypse.

Then Lisowczycy split: part of them, with Rogowski, decided to return to Poland, pillaging Slovakia on their way. Others, under Jarosz Kleczkowski, remained in the service of the Emperor for the next few years. After the death of Kleczkowski (March 4, 1620) at the Battle of Krems, Stanisław Rusinowski became the new commander of the Lisowczycy. Under Rusinowski, the Lisowczycy took part in the Battle of White Mountain (November 8) where they captured twenty standards. On May 7, 1621, the Emperor paid them their outstanding wages and released them from service, due to numerous complaints about their behaviour. Some of them returned to Poland, others served under Maximilian I, Elector of Bavaria or Habsburg Spain.

== Cecora and Chocim (Khotyn) ==
The Lisowczycy fought in the wars between Commonwealth and the Ottoman Empire, not least in the last phase of the Polish magnates' wars in Moldavia.

- Battle of Cecora
- Battle of Chocim

== Epilogue ==
After the conflict with the Ottomans was settled, many Lisowczycy, then under the command of Stanisław Stroynowski, were deployed during the mayhem of the Thirty Years' War, mostly in support of the Roman Catholic Emperor, against his Protestant enemies. Their brutality and barbarism became legendary, and they devastated the nearby German lands of the Holy Roman Empire. The local population often believed it was being attacked by Tatar hordes or non-European barbarians. The Lisowczycy proved to be a terror wherever they went, and soon most of its members formed bandit groups, pillaging the German countryside.

During the Palatinate campaign and Eighty Years' War (1621–1648), the Lisowczycy served under Spanish command in the Palatinate, Lotharingia, and Alsace regions, fighting under the leadership of Charles Bonaventure de Longueval, Gonzalo Fernández de Córdoba, and Ambrogio Spinola, who were surprised of their sadistic tactics and lack of courtesy with the enemies, as they used tactics such as burning houses with cavalrymen inside. As a result, they were mostly used as skirmishers to terrorize the army of the enemies and force them to surrender faster. The Lisowczycy were also left out of large-scale operations (by order of Íñigo Vélez de Guevara) as they were considered incorrigible and problematic. Also, they participated in Northern Italy in the Marquisate of Zuccarello during the Relief of Genoa, and then in the Flanders campaign of the Franco-Spanish War.

The last time that companies using the Lisowczycy name took part in a major war was during the late 1620s, when they were temporarily reformed to fight in Poland's continuing conflict against the Swedes in Polish Prussia, yet another stage of the Polish–Swedish War – the same conflict that set Aleksander Lisowski on the path to forming the unit that was to bear his name. These Lisowczycy were finally disbanded by an act of the Sejm, in 1636.

Even after the formation was disbanded, its members were respected (or at least, feared) even beyond the Commonwealth. Later, their atrocities were forgotten and their exploits as the defenders of the Commonwealth and faith against the Orthodox, Protestants and Muslims turned them into a legend which lives on to this day.

== Sources ==
- (in Polish) Lisowczycy nad oceanem Lodowatym.Opowieść o św. Hiobie Mazowskim, by Zbigniew Wierzbicki. 22.12.2012
