= Aleksander Józef Lisowski =

Polish–Lithuanian noble and soldier (c. 1580 – 1616)

- Died: Starodub

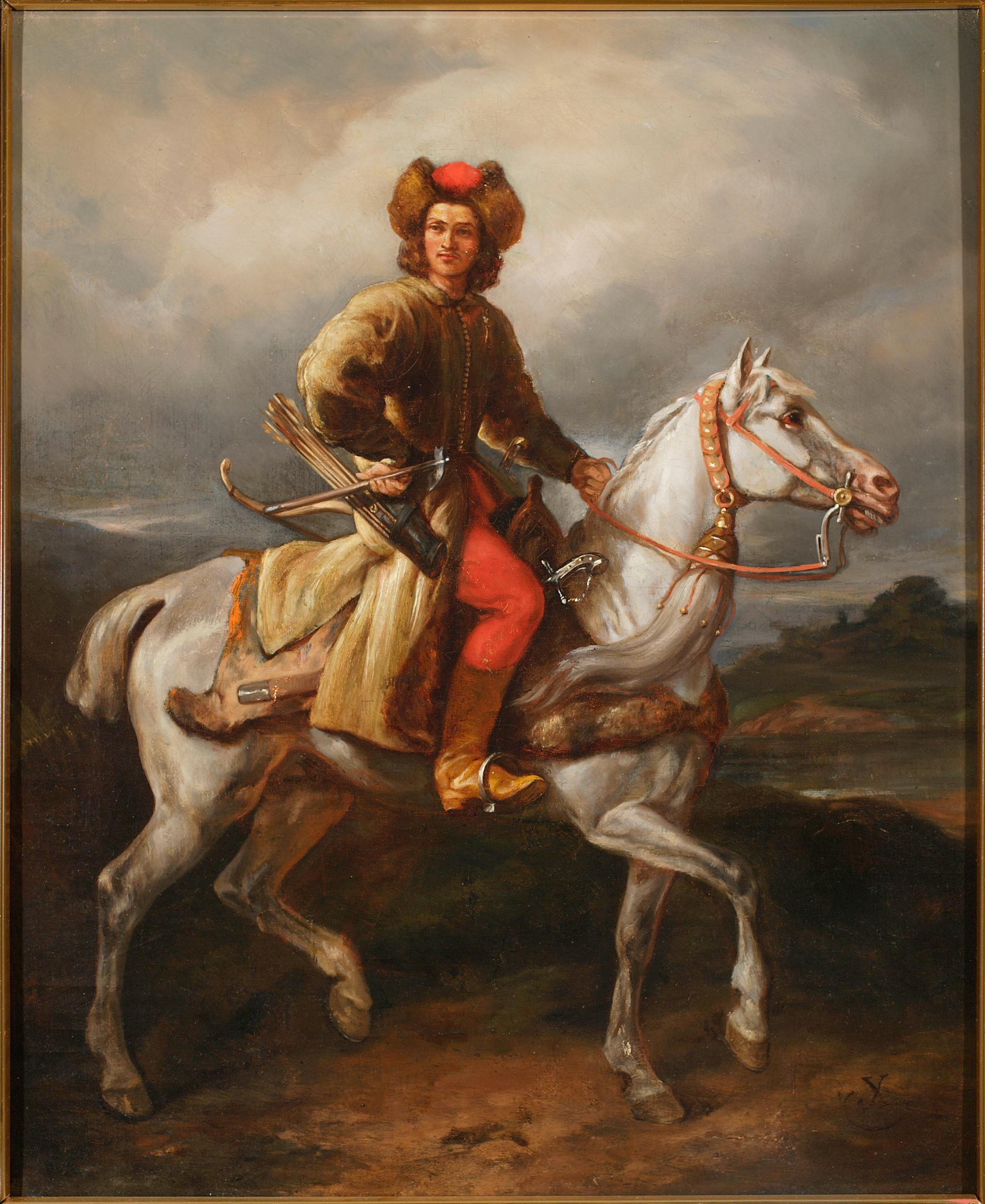
Lisowczyk, painting by Juliusz Kossak (1860)

Aleksander Józef Lisowski HNG (c. 1580 – October 11, 1616) was a Polish noble (szlachcic) who was the commander of a mercenary group known as the Lisowczyks. His coat of arms was Jeż ('Hedgehog').

== Early years ==
He came from a moderately wealthy noble family originating from Lisewo in the Chełmno Voivodeship of the Kingdom of Poland. The Lisowskis moved to the Grand Duchy of Lithuania in the mid-16th century. First references of Aleksander Józef Lisowski put him in 1601 involved with the Moldavian Magnate Wars, first as a supporter of Mihai Viteazul, later as a supporter of Great Chancellor of the Crown Jan Zamoyski.

== Rising into notoriety ==
=== Revolt against Sigismund III ===
In 1604, during the early stages of the Commonwealth's war with Sweden, the Sejm of the Polish–Lithuanian Commonwealth failed to gather money to pay its soldiers fighting in Livonia against the Swedes. Aleksander Józef Lisowski became one of the leaders of the resulting confederation – a mutinied part of the army, that decided to gather their wages by pillaging local civilians, not caring whether they pledged allegiance to Poland-Lithuania or Sweden. Although this annoyed the Great Hetman of Lithuania Jan Karol Chodkiewicz, and resulted in the banicja sentence on Lisowski, little was done to stop the mutinied forces. Soon Lisowski with his followers joined the Zebrzydowski rebellion, a larger rebellion against King Sigismund III Vasa.

== Military career ==
Eventually, after the rokosz forces were defeated in the Battle of Guzów, Lisowski's fortunes turned low and he became persona non grata in most of the Commonwealth and sought refugee with a powerful magnate family of Radziwiłłs. It was the Muscovy's Time of Troubles and Lisowski could not pass the opportunity to try to make a profit out of this, as many other local magnates and szlachta already did, meddling in the Muscovy affairs. Soon afterwards he decided to support a pretender to the Muscovy's throne, False Dmitry II. Lisowski was initially stationed near Kleck. By the end of 1607, he moved to Starodub with a unit of 200 Cossacks.

=== Polish–Muscovite War ===
In the Spring of 1608, together with Aleksander Kleczkowski, leading his forces – a band of few hundred ragtag soldiers of fortune: Don Cossacks, Ruthenians, Tatars, Germans, Swedes, Poles, Lithuanians and who knows who else, he was sent to Ryazan lands to incite uprising against Vasiliy Shuisky. He had several hundreds Don Cossacks at his command, and more local ones who joined him along the way. He captured Mikhailov, then he defeated a group led by Zakhary Lyapunov (brother of Prokopy Lyapunov) and Ivan Khovansky sent by Tsar Vasili Shuisky near Zaraysk: according to Russian chronicles the former instead of besieging the city fell drunk on the battlefield and was dispersed by Lisowski once he learned about weakness inside Zakhary's ranks. Then they set off for Kolomna, and moved on to the blockade of Moscow.

Soon however he was defeated at Niedźwiedzi Bród, losing most of his loot at hands of voivode Kurakin Ivan Semenovich. He reorganized the army and joined with Jan Piotr Sapieha, but besieged and failed to capture the fortress of Trinity Lavra of St. Sergius and were forced to retreat near Rakhmantsevo. Then came successes (pillages) at Kostroma, Soligalich and some other cities.

Around 1608–09, his troops, composed of 2,000 Cossacks, 1,000 "Boyar's children" (loyal to Dimitry) and 700 Polish riders, joined with forces of Erazm Strawiński, defeated Russian mass levy from Galich and Vologda, and conquered Kostroma, Galich, Soligalich.

=== Ingrian War ===
He took Pskov in 1610 and clashed with Swedes operating in Muscovy during the Ingrian War. Lisowczycy were essential in the defence of Smolensk in 1612, when most of regulars (wojsko kwarciane) mutinied and joined the konfederacja rohatynska. For the next three years Lisowski's forces were important in the guarding of the Polish-Muscovy border against Muscovy incursions. In 1615 Lisowski gathered many outlaws and invaded Muscovy with 6 'choragiew' of cavalry. He laid siege to Bryansk and defeated the relief force of a few thousand soldiers under kniaz Yuri Shakhovskoy near Karachev. Then Lisowski defeated the front guard of a much larger force (several times larger than himself) under the command of knyaz Dmitry Pozharsky, who decided to defend instead of attack and fortified his forces in a camp. Lisowczycy broke contact with his forces, burned Belyov and Likhvin, took Peremyshl, turned north, defeated Muscovy army at Rzhev, turned to Kara Sea, then to Kashin, burned Torzhok, returned to Poland-Lithuania without any interference from Muscovite forces.

== Death ==
Until the autumn of 1616, Lisowski and his forces remained at the Lithuanian-Muscovite border. After a short trip to Homel he returned to Starodub. There Lisowski suddenly fell ill and died in the first half of October after surveying his troops. In his memory, his men adopted the name, Lisowczycy ("Lisowski's men").
