= Konstantin Batyushkov =

Russian poet, essayist and translator (1787–1855)

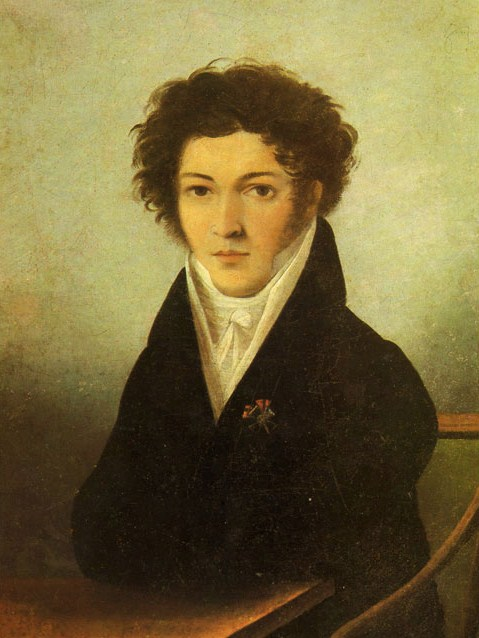
- Portrait by unknown artist, 1810s
- Born: Konstantin Nikolayevich Batyushkov; 29 May 1787; Vologda, Russian Empire
- Died: 19 July 1855 (aged 68); Vologda, Russian Empire
- Occupations: Poet; essayist; translator; diplomat

Konstantin Nikolayevich Batyushkov (Russian: Константи́н Никола́евич Ба́тюшков, IPA: [kənstɐnʲˈtʲin nʲɪkɐˈla(j)ɪvʲɪdʑ ˈbatʲʊʂkəf]; 29 May [O.S. 18 May] 1787 – 19 July [O.S. 7 July] 1855) was a Russian poet, essayist and translator of the Romantic era. He also served in the diplomatic corps, spending an extended period in 1818 and 1819 as a secretary to the Russian diplomatic mission at Naples.

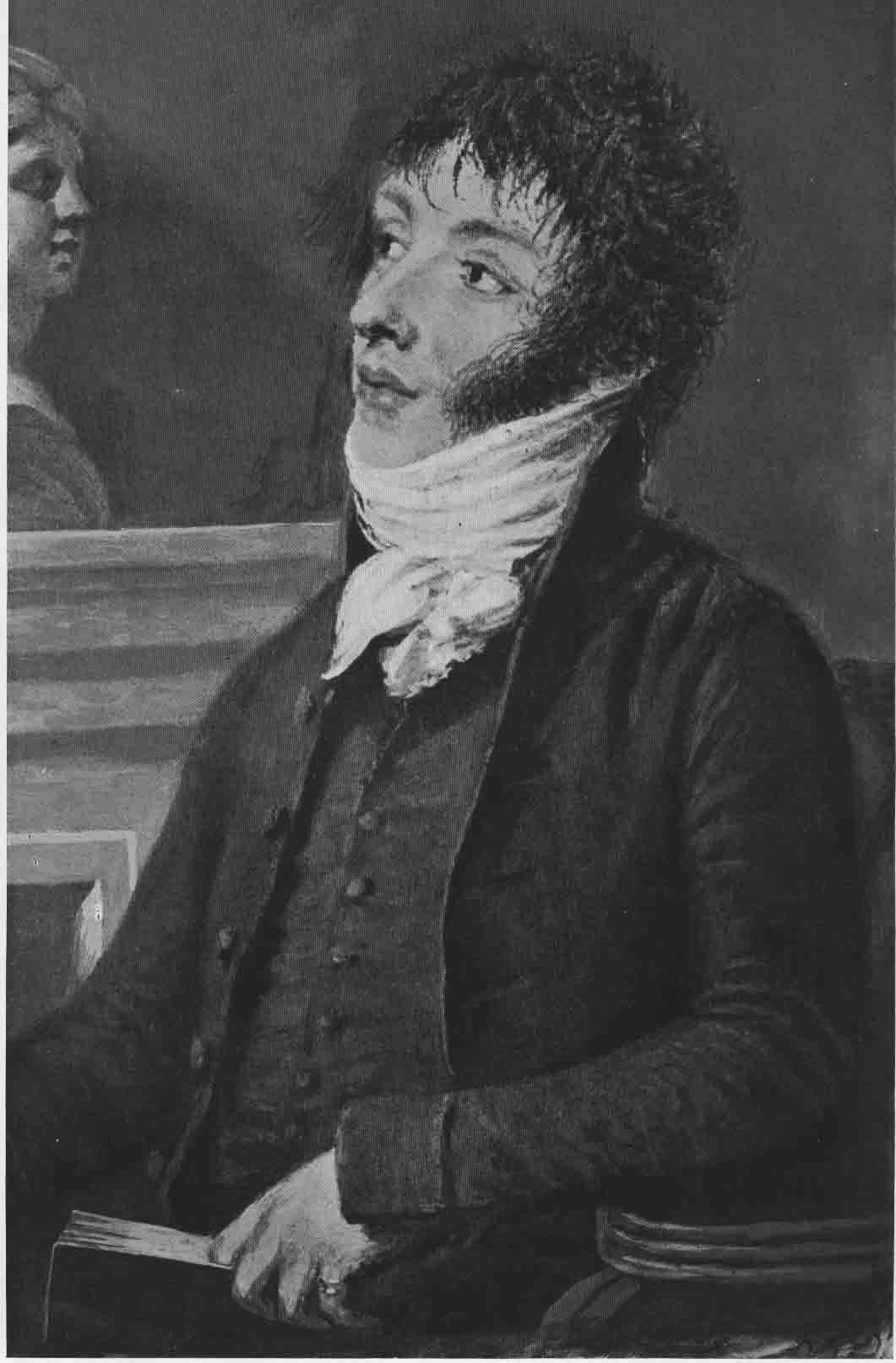
Portrait by Orest Kiprensky (1815)

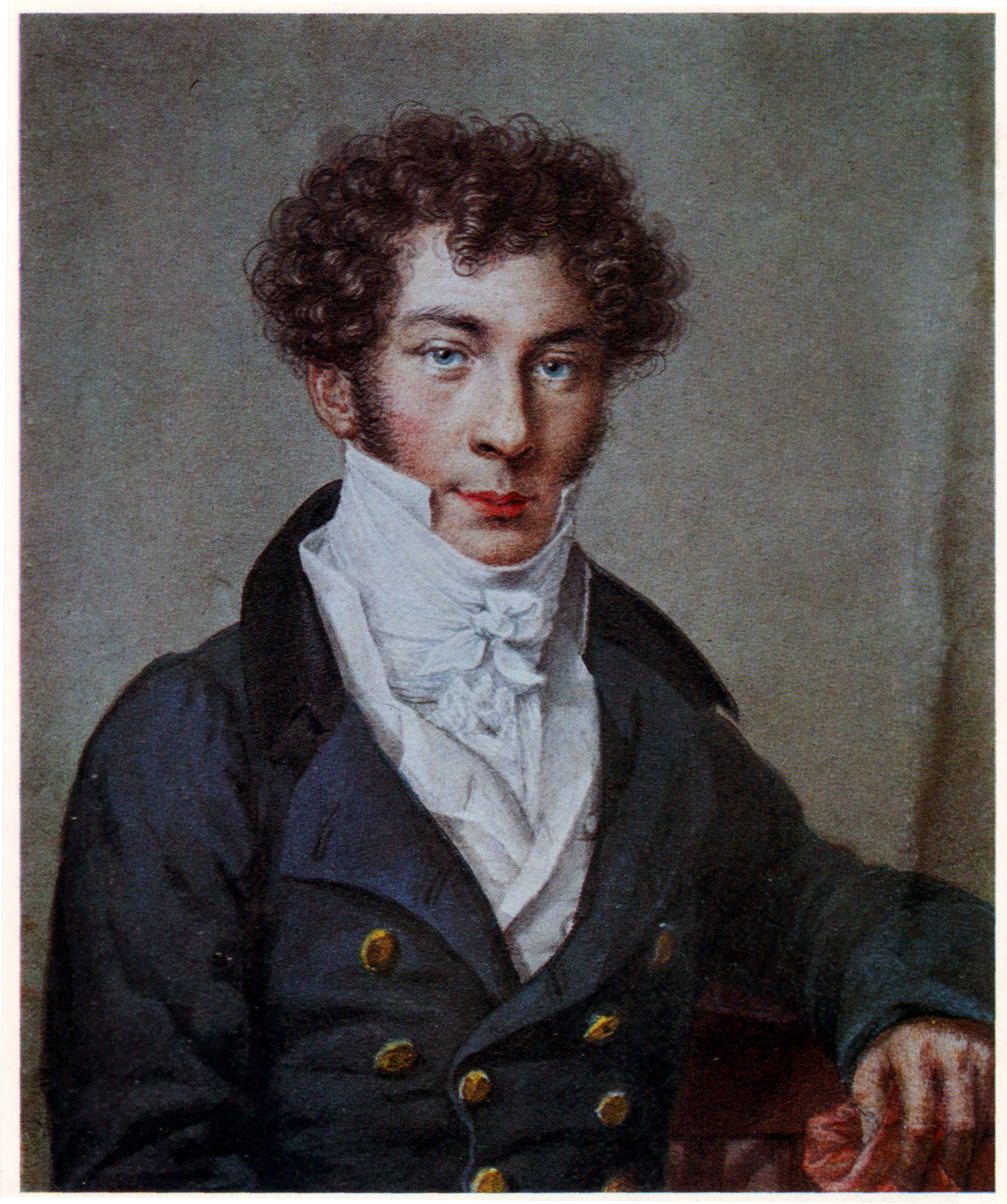
Batyushkov in 1815; portrait by Nikolai Utkin

== Biography ==
=== Early life ===
Batyushkov was born into a noble family in Vologda. His mother, Alexandra Grigoryevna (née Berdyaeva), died in 1795 when he was six years old. He was sent to boarding schools in Saint Petersburg from 1797, where he studied French and Italian literature. His cousin, the poet and educator Mikhail Muravyov, guided his early reading and taught him Latin, introducing him to Tibullus and Horace. In 1802, Batyushkov took a position at the Ministry of Public Education.

=== Military service ===
In 1807, Batyushkov enlisted in the militia against his father's wishes. He was wounded on 29 May at the Battle of Heilsberg and received the Order of St. Anna, 3rd class. After recovering in Riga, he took part in the Russo-Swedish War of 1808–1809. During the campaign of 1813, he served as adjutant to General Raevsky and fought at the Battle of Leipzig, where his close friend the poet I.A. Petin was killed. He received the Order of St. Anna, 2nd class, and was transferred to the Izmailovsky Regiment.

=== Literary career ===
Batyushkov's first published poem, "Epistle to My Verses," appeared in 1805. His early verse drew on Latin models and on Italian poetry, particularly Tasso and Petrarch. In 1815, he was elected to the Arzamas literary society under the pseudonym "Achilles." His principal collection, Experiments in Verse and Prose (Opyty v stikhakh i proze), was published in October 1817 and brought together his verse and critical essays. Alexander Pushkin regarded Batyushkov as a formative influence on his own development as a poet.

=== Diplomatic service and illness ===
In 1818, Batyushkov was appointed to the Russian diplomatic mission in Naples, where he also traveled to Venice and Rome. He returned in 1821, but his mental health had begun to deteriorate. By 1822, he was suffering severe episodes and attempted suicide three times while in Simferopol. He spent four years (1823–1828) at the Sonnenstein psychiatric facility in Saxony without improvement, then lived in Moscow until 1833. He spent his final twenty-two years in the care of a nephew in Vologda, where he died on 19 July 1855. He was buried at the Spaso-Prilutsky Monastery outside the city.

== Legacy ==
Alexander Pushkin compared Batyushkov's contribution to the Russian literary language to that of Petrarch in Italian literature. In 1830, Pushkin visited Batyushkov in Moscow, by which time Batyushkov could no longer recognize visitors. Pushkin's poem "God grant I don't go mad" (Не дай мне бог сойти с ума) has been linked to the impression left by this visit.

A monument by sculptor Vyacheslav Klykov and architect V. Snegirev stands at his grave at the Spaso-Prilutsky Monastery near Vologda. A memorial plaque was unveiled on the Fontanka embankment in Saint Petersburg on 29 May 2001. Batyushkov Street in Vologda, where he spent his final twenty-two years, is named in his honour, and a museum operates in the house where he lived.

A 2017 English-language edition, Writings from the Golden Age of Russian Poetry, translated by Peter France, was published by Columbia University Press.
