= Johann Grabbe =

German composer

Johann Gottlieb Grabbe (1585–1655) was a German composer.

A child prodigy, he became a member of the Bückeburg Court choir at 11, learned the organ from Cornelius Conradus, succeeded him as organist, and was then, like Heinrich Schütz, awarded a scholarship to study with Giovanni Gabrieli in Venice. While there, Grabbe published his Primo libro of madrigals as his graduation thesis.
