= Priluki Monastery =

Monastery in Vologda, Russia

Coordinates: 59°15′44″N 39°53′22″E

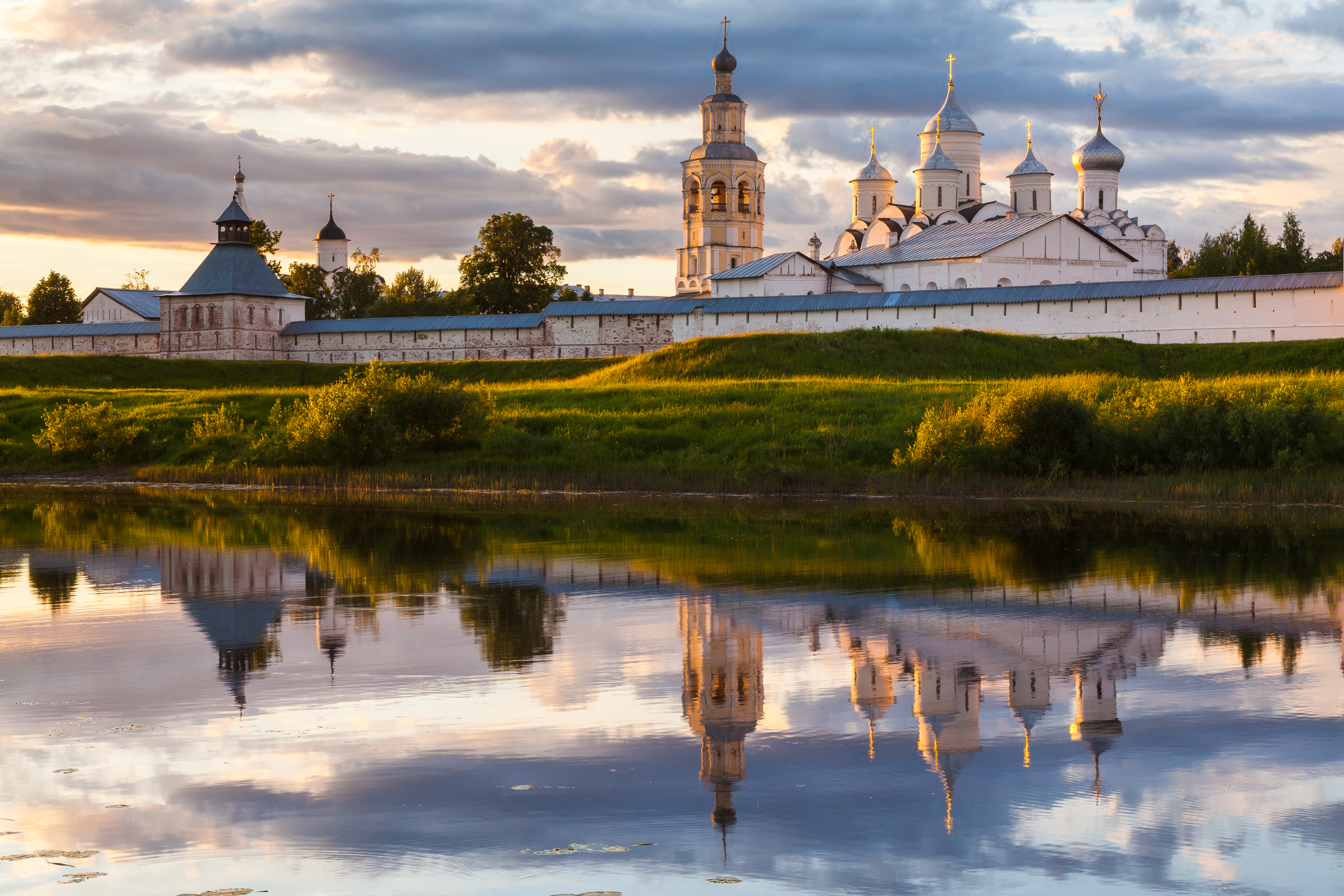
- Interactive map of Priluki Monastery

Monastery information
- Full name: Спасо-Прилуцкий Димитриев монастырь
- Order: Russian Orthodox Church
- Established: 1371, 1991
- Disestablished: 1924
- Diocese: Vologda and Veliky Ustyug Eparchy

People
- Founder: Dmitry Prilutsky

Site
- Location: Vologda, Vologda Oblast, Russia
- Public access: Yes

The Spaso-Prilutsky Monastery (Russian: Спасо-Прилуцкий Димитриев монастырь) is a fortified (walled) Russian Orthodox monastery in the settlement of Priluki on the bank of the Vologda River near the city of Vologda. Its history goes back to the 14th-century missionary activities of St. Sergius of Radonezh and his disciples. Most surviving buildings date from the 16th and 17th centuries. Since 1993 Priluki has been administered as part of Vologda.

== History ==
The monastery was founded by Saint Demetrius of Priluki, formerly a hegumen of the Nikolsky Monastery in Pereslavl-Zalessky. Demetrius (aka Dimitry) left Pereslavl since he thought it was too crowded, and moved north. He first decided to settle down on the Obnora River (currently in Gryazovetsky District), but he was not accepted warmly by the local population, so he moved further north. After coming to a meander (priluka) of the Vologda River, he built a wooden church and the cells. The place came to be known as Priluki afterwards.

The Grand Dukes of Moscow (starting with Dmitry Donskoy) supported this monastic establishment in order to expand their influence in the Russian North. Vasily III of Moscow visited the monastery personally in 1528, when he and his wife Elena, childless for a long time, had set on a pilgrimage across the Russian North to pray for a child. Their son Ivan is known to have prayed before the Cilician ivory cross from the monastery before his decisive attack on Kazan in 1552. On December 16, 1612, the monastery was captured and burned by Polish-Lithuanian brigands, the so-called Lisowczycy. As of 1764, it owned more than 100 villages with 2819 male peasants.

In August 1924, the Communists had the monastery abolished. The Cilician cross was confiscated, the ancient library and icons dispersed. The buildings were subsequently used for a variety of purposes, including living quarters, a prison, a depot, and a museum. They underwent a comprehensive restoration (starting in 1954) which resulted in a medievalized appearance. In 1991, the monastery was re-established. The relics of St. Demetrius, his staff and penance chains (verigi) are still kept at one of the churches.

== Architecture ==
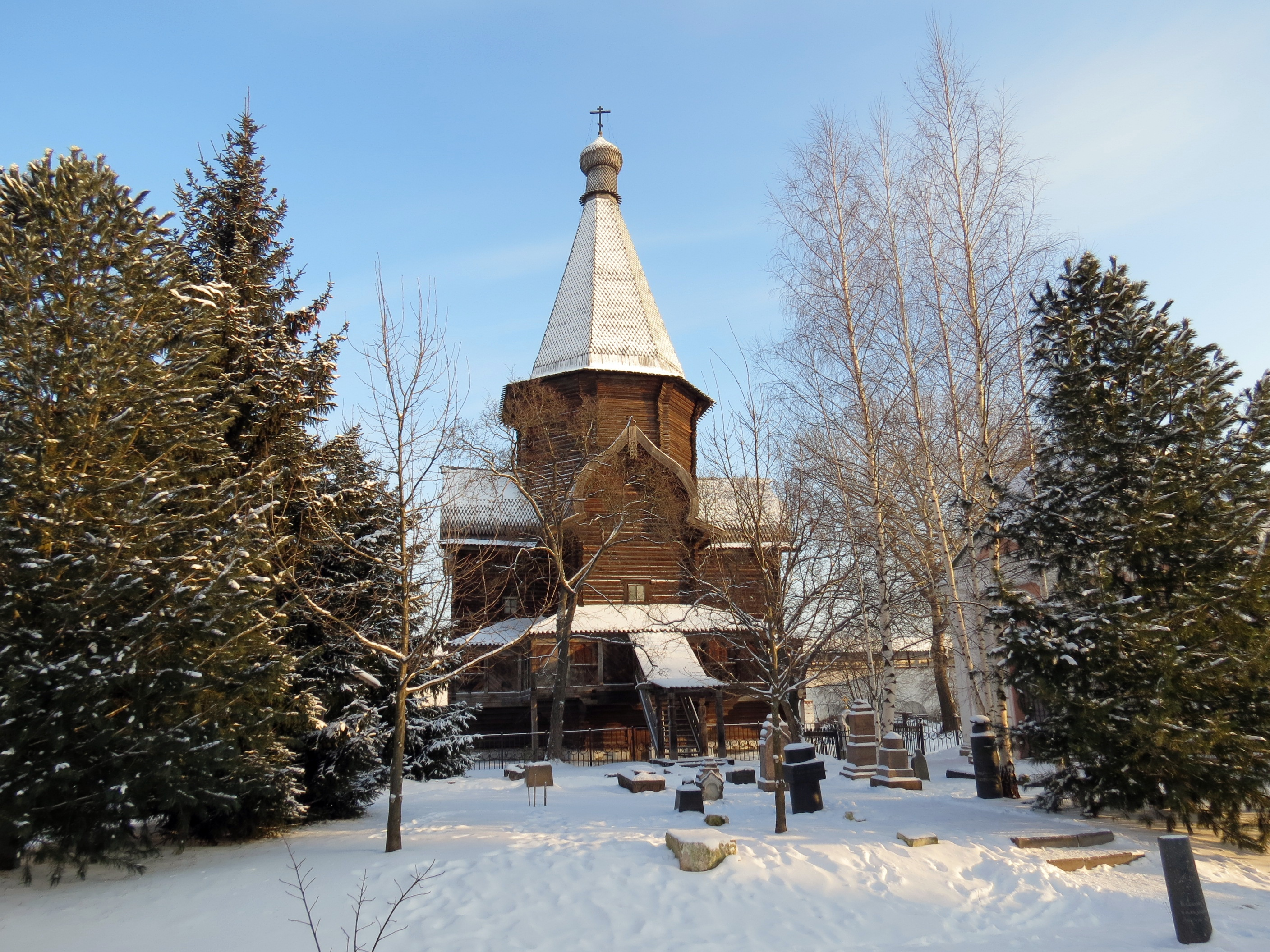
A graveyard near the 500-years-old Dormition Church

The monastery is built as a fortress, has an approximately rectangular shape, and is completely surrounded by a wall, which has four corner towers and three gates. The northern wall has the main gate and the gate Resurrection Church, the western wall has a gate leading to the Vologda River, and the southern wall has the third gate which is now defunct. The wall was built after the monastery had been devastated in the Time of Troubles; its construction was completed in 1656.

The katholikon, located in the center of the monastery and dedicated to the Feast of the Transfiguration, was built between 1537 and 1542. It was the first stone (non-wooden) building in or around Vologda. The bell-tower was built between 1639 and 1654. In 1811, the main church burnt down but was repaired between 1813 and 1817. In the meanwhile, during the French invasion of Russia, the Grande Armée occupied Moscow, and some of the treasures belonging to the church were speedily evacuated from Moscow. They were kept in Spaso-Prilutsky Monastery, in the katholikon (which at the time was still damaged). The katholikon is connected by a covered passageway to some other buildings, notably the Presentation Church (built before 1623).

The Church of All Saints was built in 1721, and the Church of Saint Catherine dates from 1830. The wooden Dormition Church (built ca. 1540) was brought to Priluki from the Alexandro-Kushtsky Monastery (close to the village of Ustye) in 1962. It is the earliest surviving wooden tent-like church. The monastery graveyard contains the Neoclassical tomb of Konstantin Batyushkov (1787–1855).
