= Wojciech Dębołęcki =

Polish monk (1585–1646)

Wojciech Dębołęcki (Polish pronunciation: [ˈvɔjt͡ɕɛɣ dɛmbɔˈwɛnt͡skʲi]; 1585–1646), also spelled Wojciech Dembołęcki, was a Polish Franciscan friar, writer and composer. His musical works are among the first to use basso continuo. In his poetry, he praised the Sarmatism culture. He was the chaplain of one of the best military units of his times, irregular unit of Polish–Lithuanian Commonwealth light cavalry - Lisowczycy, fighting on battlefields from Picardy to the banks of the White Sea. Dębołęcki has chronicled their history in his Przewagi elearów polskich, or The victories of Polish cavalry (1623).

Dębołęcki was born into a szlachta family of Jakub Konojadzki and Barbara née Decjusz. As a teenager, he acquired good education, studying at a Franciscan school in Kraków, and joining the order in 1603. Probably in 1603 - 1605 he stayed in Opole, and in 1615, preached in Kalisz. In 1617, he was sent to Chełmno, and probably in late 1617, he left Poland, heading to Venice and Rome. Dębołęcki spent two years in Italy: on his way back, he stopped at Olomouc, creating the Association of Christian Soldiers.

In 1621 - 1622, Dębołęcki served as a chaplain of the Lisowczycy, a legendary light cavalry unit, which at that time was under the service of the Holy Roman Emperor in the Thirty Years' War. He fought with them in Hungary, and after the dissolution of the force, went to Rome to continue studies and achieve a doctorate in theology (1623-1625). In 1626, Dębołęcki settled in Kamieniec Podolski, where he founded an organization which purchased prisoners from Muslim hands. Some of his works were controversial and were published anonymously under pseudonyms, so their authorship is uncertain. According to some sources, Dębołęcki's reputation was dubious, and to clean his name, once again he went to Rome, staying there in 1630 - 1632. After returning to Poland, he settled in Lwów.
