= Zakhary Lyapunov =

Russian politician (died after 1612)

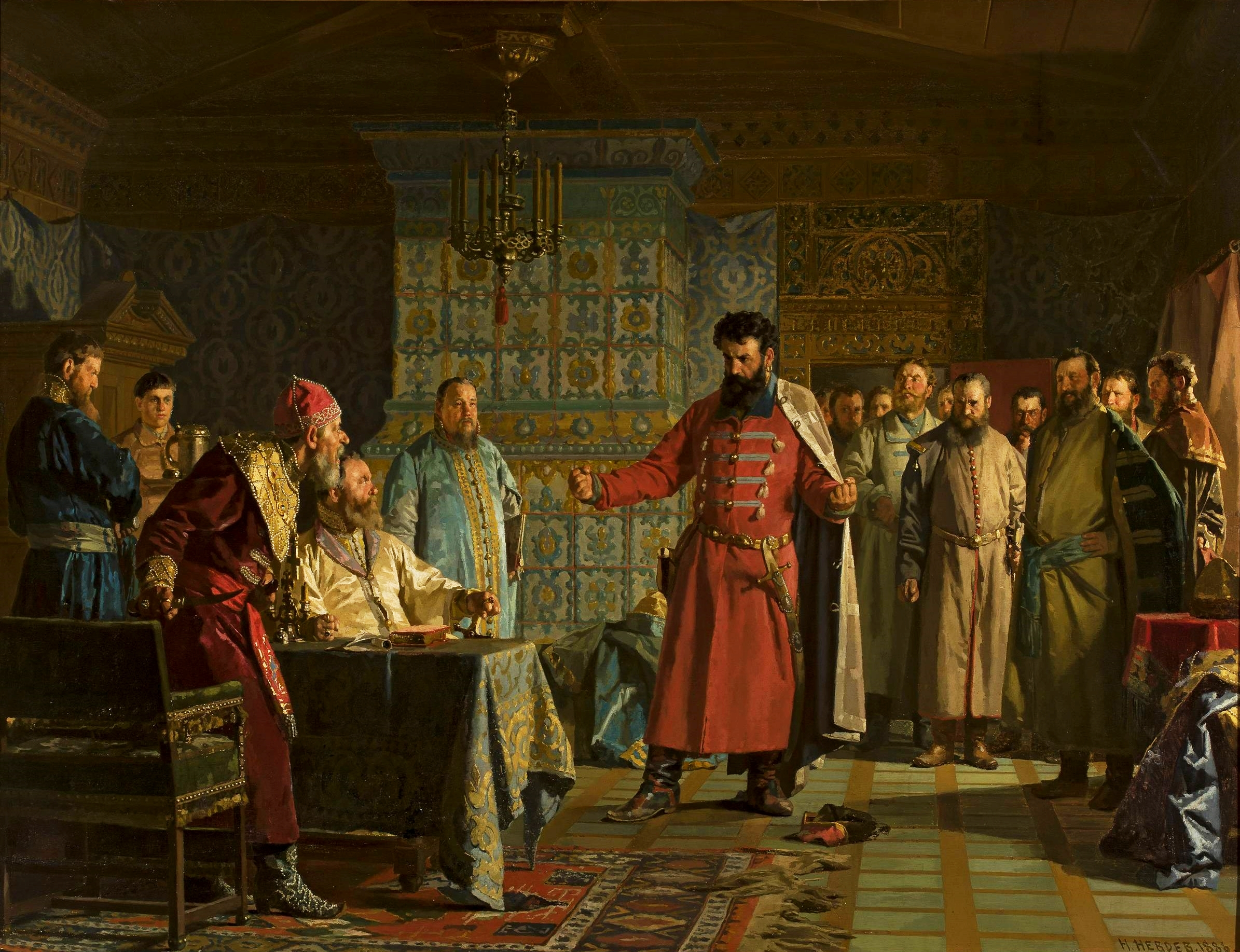
Zakhary Lyapunov's quarrel with Tsar Vasily Shuysky in the Kremlin. Painting by Nikolai Nevrev, 1886.

Zakhary Petrovich Lyapunov (Russian: Захарий Петрович Ляпунов; died after 1612) was a Russian politician and military commander during the Time of Troubles. He was the brother of Prokopy Lyapunov.

== Biography ==
In 1605, during the Time of Troubles, Lyapunov took the side of False Dmitry I. Upon the latter's death in 1606, he took part in the Bolotnikov Uprising in 1606–1607. In 1607, he joined the ranks of Vasily Shuisky and became a commander of a unit of the Ryazan dvoryane during the struggle against the rebellious peasants and supporters of False Dmitry II.

In July 1610, Lyapunov took an active part in deposing Vasily Shuisky. On July 7, 1610, he publicly demanded Shuisky abdicate, and after he refused, he stirred up public resistance against Shuisky. In September 1610, he was included in a diplomatic mission sent to the outskirts of Smolensk to sign a treaty with the Polish king Sigismund III Vasa regarding the accession of his son Wladislaus to the Russian throne. He then returned to Moscow and remained in the city until its liberation from the Polish invaders by the army of Kuzma Minin and Dmitry Pozharsky in 1612.

== Sources ==
- "Ляпуновы, Захар и Прокофий" . Brockhaus and Efron Encyclopedic Dictionary (in Russian). 1906.
