= Battle of Tver =

1609 battle

- Part of Russian–Polish War of 1605–1618
| Date | July 21–23, 1609 |
| Location | Near Tver |
| Result | Russo-Swedish victory |

Belligerents
| Tsardom of Russia; Kingdom of Sweden; German and French mercenaries | Polish–Lithuanian Commonwealth |

Commanders and leaders
| Mikhail Skopin-Shuisky; Jacob De la Gardie | Aleksander Zborowski |

Strength
| Up to 18,000 | About 9,000 |

Casualties and losses
| Unknown | Heavy |

The Battle of Tver took place in two stages on July 21–23, 1609, during the Russo-Polish War between a Russian–Swedish combined army and the Polish–Lithuanian army.

== Background ==
After the Battle of Torzhok on June 27, Aleksander Zborowski retreated to Tver, and large reinforcements were sent to his aid. By early July, the Russian army gathered in Torzhok, as well as the Swedes, German, and French mercenaries. Skopin-Shuisky insisted on speedy action until enemy reinforcements arrived. Therefore, they immediately formed regiments, which went to Tver. Mercenaries were distributed among the regiments. The Russian army was as follows:

- Big Regiment – Mikhail Vasilievich Shuisky and Jacob De la Gardie;
- Front Regiment – Golovin Semyon Vasilievich and German captain;
- Watch Regiment – Baryatinsky Yakov Petrovich and German captain.

The Polish–Lithuanian troops under Tver made up 12 regiments, and their main force was 5,000 horsemen of Aleksander Zborowski.

== Course of the battle ==
On July 17–18, the Russian army left Torzhok, and on July 21 approached Tver and camped 10 miles from it. The interventionist army took up fortified positions. Therefore, Skopin-Shuisky began to operate in small horse detachments in order to lure the enemy, but the battles of the advanced detachments did not lead to anything. Then he led the entire army, constructed as follows: in the center stood the Swedish and German infantry, on the left flank – the French and German cavalry, and on the right – the Russian. It was planned by blows from the left flank to distract the enemy army, after which a powerful blow from the right flank to cut it off from the city and push it to the Volga.

However, the Polish cavalry attacked first, concentrating the blow on the left flank. The French and German cavalry could not stand the Polish attack and soon turned into a stampede, having suffered heavy losses. However, the infantry in the center withstood the onslaught and was able to repel it, despite the fact that it was raining heavily (which prevented it from using firearms). The Russian cavalry withstood the attack. By 19 hours the battle was over and the interventionists returned to the fortifications. Soon the remnants of the French–German cavalry returned.

On July 23, in the early morning, Russian and Swedish troops broke into Polish fortifications and a fierce battle began. Then Skopin-Shuisky struck an unexpected blow, which led to victory. Here is what is reported about this attack in The Story of the Victories of the Moscow State:

His warlike people armed themselves with a lot of force, beginning to chase after the Polish people. And by the Divine Grace, and by the wise providence, and by the courage of the boyar and the voivode Prince Mikhail Vasilievich Skopin, we have beaten the Polish and Lithuanian people, and have taken their camps, and have besieged Tver. And under Tver, Russian and German people took a lot of wealth from the Polish people.

From the Polish side, Pastor Conrad Bussow mentioned this:

Skopin and De la Gardie, having won, moved forward, crossed the Volga and occupied Tver; here they met with 5,000 horse-lancers, sent by Dmitry under the command of pan Zborovsky, fought with them and, defeated, fled for the Volga; but they soon became encouraged: the next day they started the battle again and with such courage struck the Poles that Zborovsky could not resist; covered in shame, having lost many soldiers, he retired to the Tushino camp. This failure further embittered Demetrius against the Germans.

And the Swedes attributed all the merits to themselves:

At the time when Dimitri was having so much fun, feasting and rejoicing in the camp near Moscow, the Swedish commander, Count Jacob De la Gardie, with the Russian leader, Mikhail Skopin, approached the city of Tver; they had a great battle with the Poles, and the Swedes again won, who defeated and put the Poles to flight. At the end of the battle, the Russian commander Skopin threw himself on the neck to Count De la Gardie with tears in his eyes and thanked him that his uncle, the Grand Duke, and the entire Russian state would never be able to adequately thank him and the royal army, let alone pay for this important service.

== Aftermath ==
The Polish–Lithuanian army suffered heavy losses, pan Zborovsky with his remnants fled to the camp, pursued 40 miles. However, in Tver there remained the garrison of Pan Krasovsky. Skopin-Shuisky began to attack Moscow, and De la Gardie attempted to storm Tver, but to no avail. French and German mercenaries suffered very heavy losses and soon deserted. Soon, most of the mercenaries left – only a part of the Swedish troops, led by De la Gardie, remained. Skopin-Shuisky took into account the experience of the battle, so he began to form the army from the peasants, which was trained by Christian Zomme.

== See also ==
- De la Gardie campaign

== Sources ==
- Vadim Kargalov. "Russian Governors of the 16–17th Centuries", 2005. ISBN 5-9533-0813-2
