= Military history of Russia =

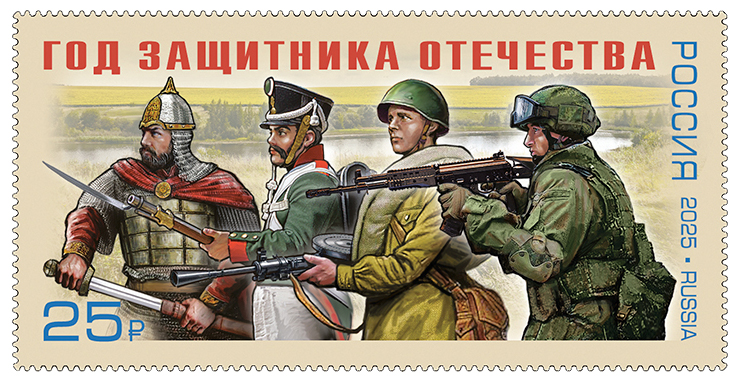
2025 Russian post stamp

The military history of Russia has antecedents involving Kievan Rus' and the Rus' principalities that succeeded it, the Mongol invasion of the early 13th century, Russia's numerous wars against Grand Duchy of Lithuania, Crown of the Kingdom of Poland, Sweden, and Ottoman Empire, Prussia (Seven Years' War), France (especially the Napoleonic Wars and the Crimean War). The 20th century saw Russia's involvement in two world wars, as well as smaller military conflicts. During the Cold War, the greatly enlarged armed forces suppressed rebellions in Eastern Europe and became a nuclear superpower hostile to NATO, as well as China after 1960. The post-Cold War military history of the Russian Federation began in 1991.

The military history of Russia includes:

- the military history of Kievan Rus' (see also Military of Kievan Rus')
- the military history of the Rus' principalities (see also Armies of the Rus' principalities)
  - such as Muscovy (the Grand Duchy of Moscow, see also Landed Army)
- the military history of the Tsardom of Russia
- Military history of the Russian Empire
- Military history of the Soviet Union
- Military history of the Russian Federation

== See also ==
- History of Russia
- Foreign policy of the Russian Empire
- Russo-Turkish wars
- Russia and the Middle East
- Timeline of Russian history
- Timeline of Russian innovation
- List of wars involving Kievan Rus'
- List of wars involving the Grand Duchy of Moscow
- List of wars involving Russia
