= Armies of the Rus' principalities =

13th-16th century militaries

The armies of the Rus' principalities emerged in the 13th century out of the military of Kievan Rus', shattered by the Mongol invasion of Kievan Rus'. The princely Rus' armies from 1240 to 1550 were characterised by feudalism, consisting of cavalry armies of noble militia and their armed servants.

== Before the Mongol invasion ==
Before Mongol invasion of Kievan Rus' in the 13th century, a Rus' prince would be accompanied by his druzhina, a small retinue of heavy cavalry, who would often fight dismounted (eq. Battle on the Ice). Massively heavy armor was used, mostly Scandinavian-style. However, these squads, as a rule, did not exceed the number of several hundred men, and were unsuitable for united actions under a single command.

At the same time, the main part of the Kievan Rus' army was the militia infantry. It was inferior to Druzhina in armament and the ability to own it. The militia used axes and hunting spears ("rogatina"). Swords were rarely used, and they had no armor other than plain clothes and fur hats.

For the infantry, consisted of poorly armed peasants and tradesmen, numbers are uncertain. The only specific numbers mentioned for the Rus are 1,700 men of Evpaty Kolovrat (The Tale of the Destruction of Ryazan) and 3,000, men under Voivode Dorozh (Battle of the Sit River). However, these were exceptionally large numbers for Rus standards at the time. In 1242, Prince Alexander Nevski in Novgorod could muster no more than 1,000 Druzhina and 2,000 militia for the Battle on the Ice.

== Feudal fragmentation ==
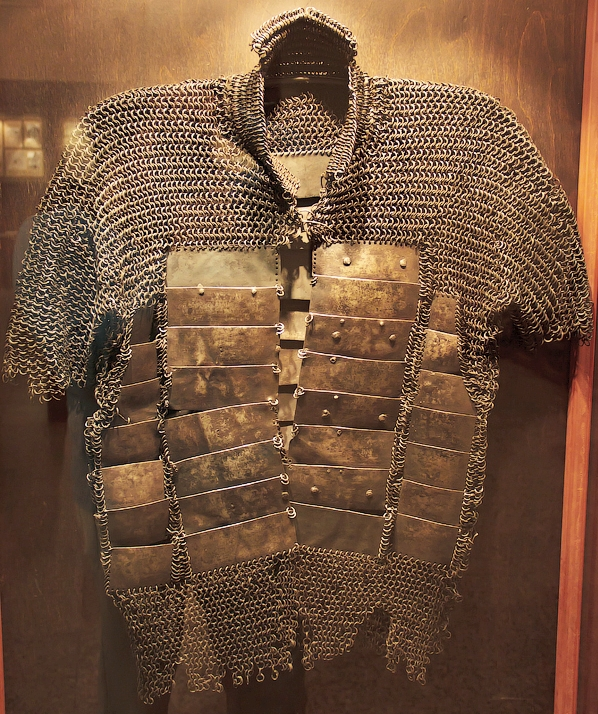
13th-century Rus' mail and plate.

After Mongol invasion of Kievan Rus' many independent principalities were destroyed. Remaining petty states were under growing pressure from Tatars, Sweden and Lithuania. Constant warfare precipitated the development of feudalism, and diminished the importance of the Veche. The feudal militia, raised by the Boyars-landowners and individual princes, came to replace popular militia. Princes (except in the Novgorod Republic) gathered and commanded the army.

In the second half of the 14th century, Druzhina was replaced by feudally organized units headed by Boyars or dependent Princes, and these units consisted of landed gentry (so called "Boyar's children" or "service people") and their armed servants ("military slaves"). In the 15th century, such organization of detachments replaced the city regiments.

== Tactics and equipment ==
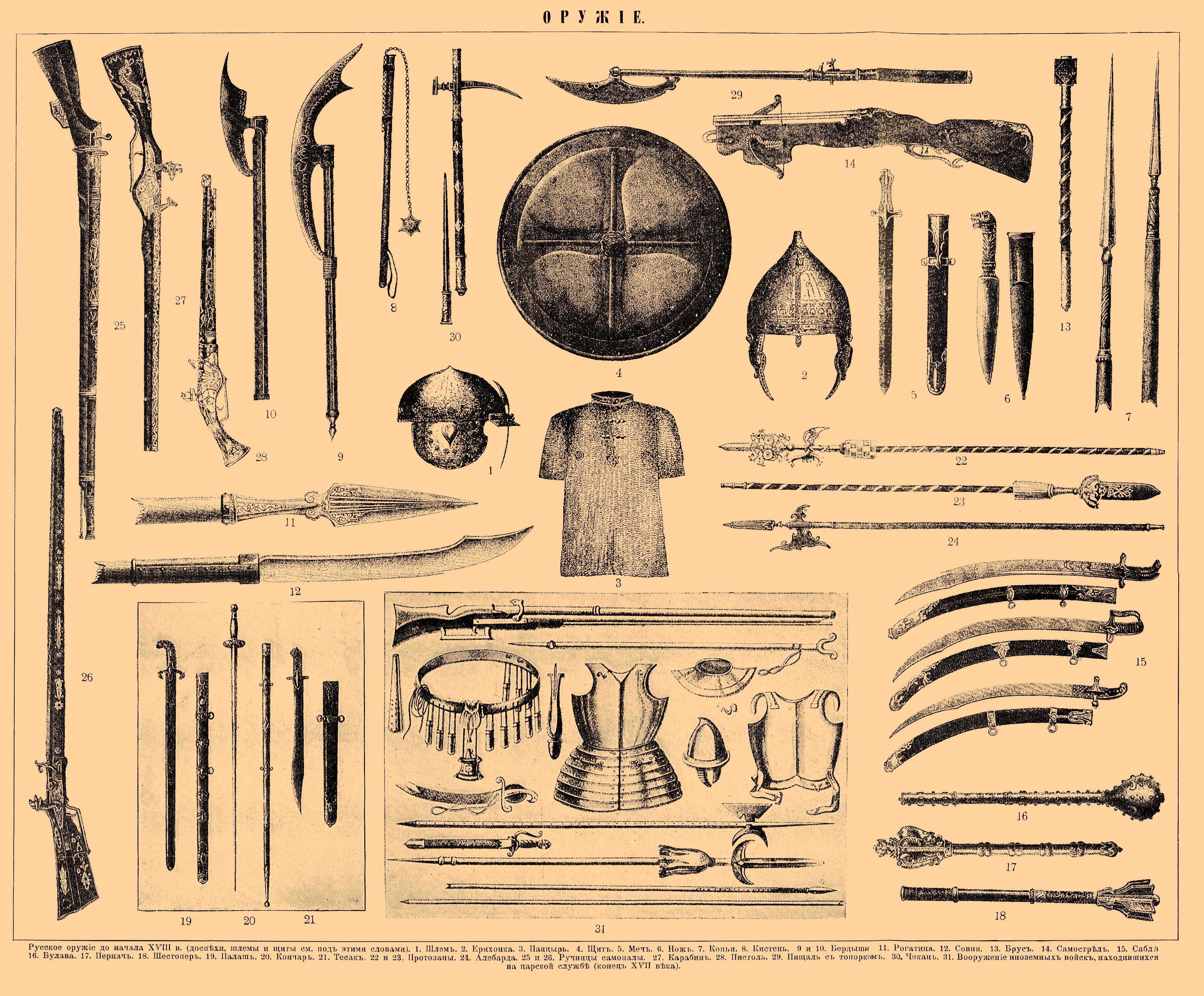
Weapons used in East Slavic lands before the 18th century.

During the period of the Mongol invasions, the Rus adopted much of Mongol military tactics and organization. While militia infantry still existed, they were, from XIV onward, mostly armed with ranged weapons, and delegated auxiliary duties, such as defending cities. The chronicles describe the Muscovites using arquebuses against the Tatars in 1480. The men shooting these weapons were the forerunners of the Streltsy.

The bulk of the army were mounted archers, who included Boyars, landed gentry ("Boyars' children") and armed slaves.

Under Tatar influence, the mail and lamellar armour of Kievan Rus' was replaced with brigandine ("Kuyak"), mail and plate ("Behterets") and mirror armour("Zertsalo"), while poor noblemen and armed serfs wore long aketons ("Tyegilyai").

== Ruthenian military units ==
Modern depiction of the banner of Lviv land used during the Battle of Grunwald

After the establishment of Polish rule over Galicia in 1349, the Kingdom of Rus (Ruthenia) retained its nominal autonomy, symbols of power, currency, laws and administration, functioning as a state in personal union with the Polish crown until 1434. Consequently, military units of the kingdom took part in military campaigns of the Polish royal army under their own banners. During the Battle of Grunwald in 1410 troops from Halych, Lviv, Podillia, Peremyshl and Kholm took part in the fighting as part of the Polish army, each under their own banner. Among Ruthenian knights who distinguished themselves in the battle were Ivanko Sushchyk of Romanov in Lviv land (now part of Bibrka urban hromada) and Fredr of Pleshovets (now Pleshevychi in Shehyni rural hromada). Ruthenian nobles who distinguished themselves in the battle were awarded landholdings and titles by the Polish king. In 1417 a church was founded in Kholm (Chełm) to honour the local unit's actions against the Teutons. Units of Rus' principalities under Lithuanian rule participated in the war in a similar manner: at Grunwald, warriors from the principalities of Volyn, Kyiv and Chernihiv fought as part of the Lithuanian army under the banners of their lands.

== Military of Novgorod ==
Like other Russian states, the military of Novgorod consisted of a levy and the prince's retinue (druzhina). While potentially all free Novgorodians could be mobilised, in reality the number of recruits depended on the level of danger faced by Novgorod. The professional formations included the retinues of the archbishop and prominent boyars, as well as the garrisons of fortresses. Firearms were first mentioned in 1394, and in the 15th century, fortress artillery was used, and cannons were installed on ships.

== Landed Army of Muscovy ==
In the 15th century, the Grand Duchy of Moscow gradually conquered and annexed the northeastern Rus' principalities. This process is associated with reforming the Muscovite army, as new princedoms were absorbed, courts of independent princes were dismissed, and "service people" passed to the grand duke. As a result, the vassal princes and boyars were transformed into state servants, who received estates for service in conditional holding (less often - in fiefdom). Thus, the "Landed Army" (Russian: Поместное войско) was formed, the bulk of which were noblemen and "boyar's children", with their armed slaves. This army organization would remain unchanged till 1550 (military reforms of Ivan the Terrible).

In the process of Muscovite state-building, the people's militia was abolished. The prince called the masses to military service only in the event of serious military danger, regulating the extent and nature of this service at his own discretion.

== Gallery ==
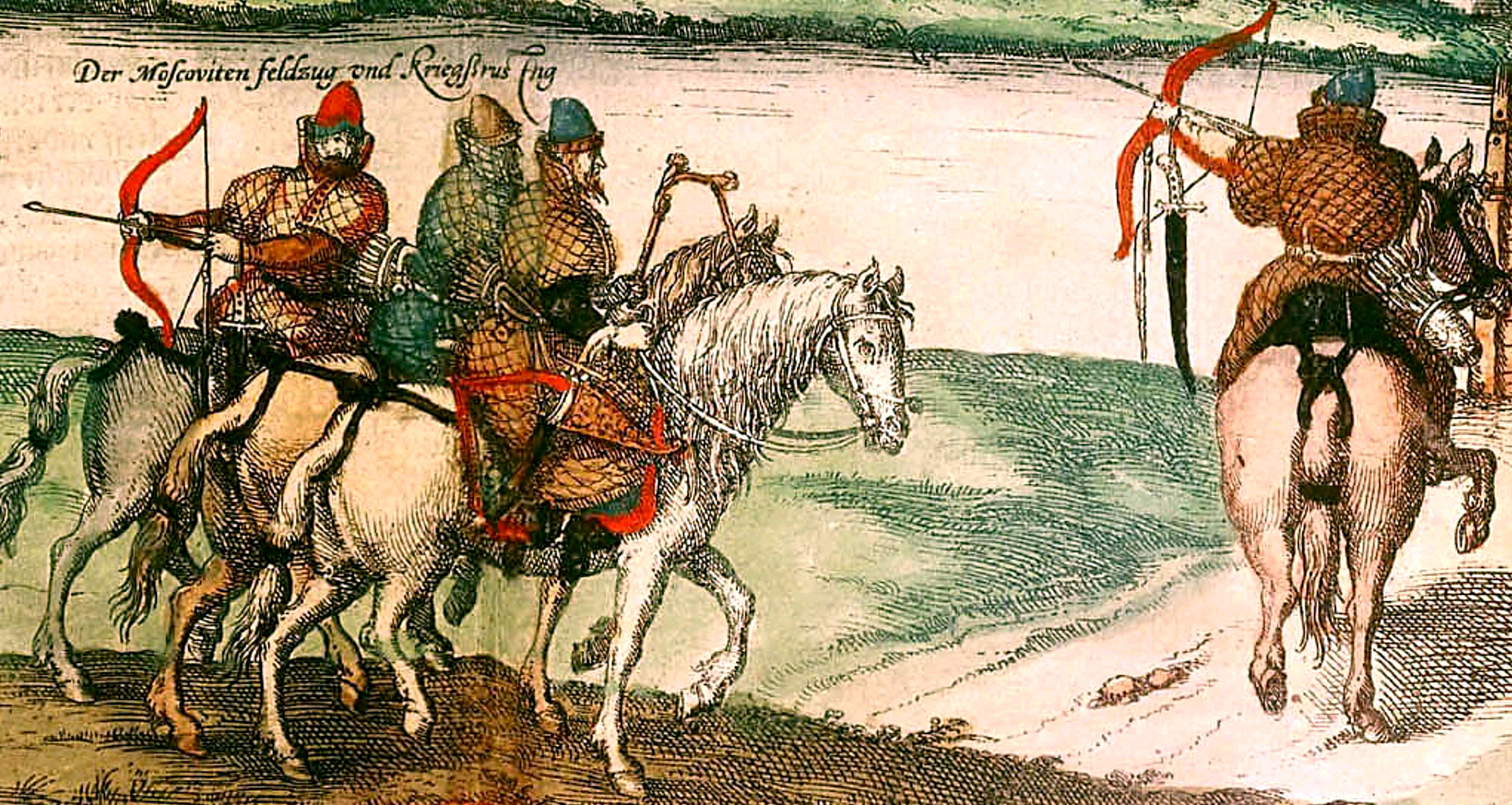
Armed servants in aketons.

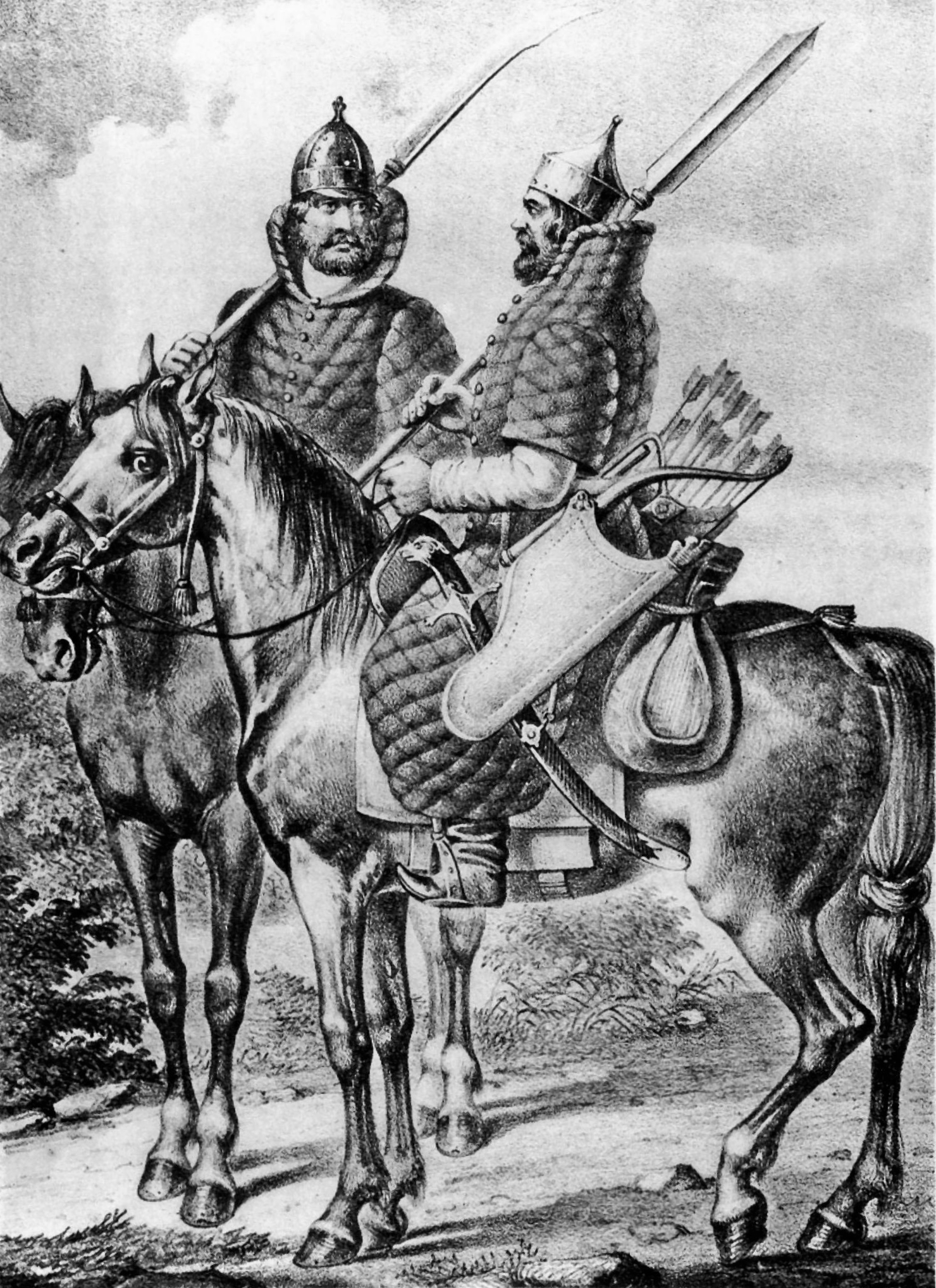
Warriors in aketons.

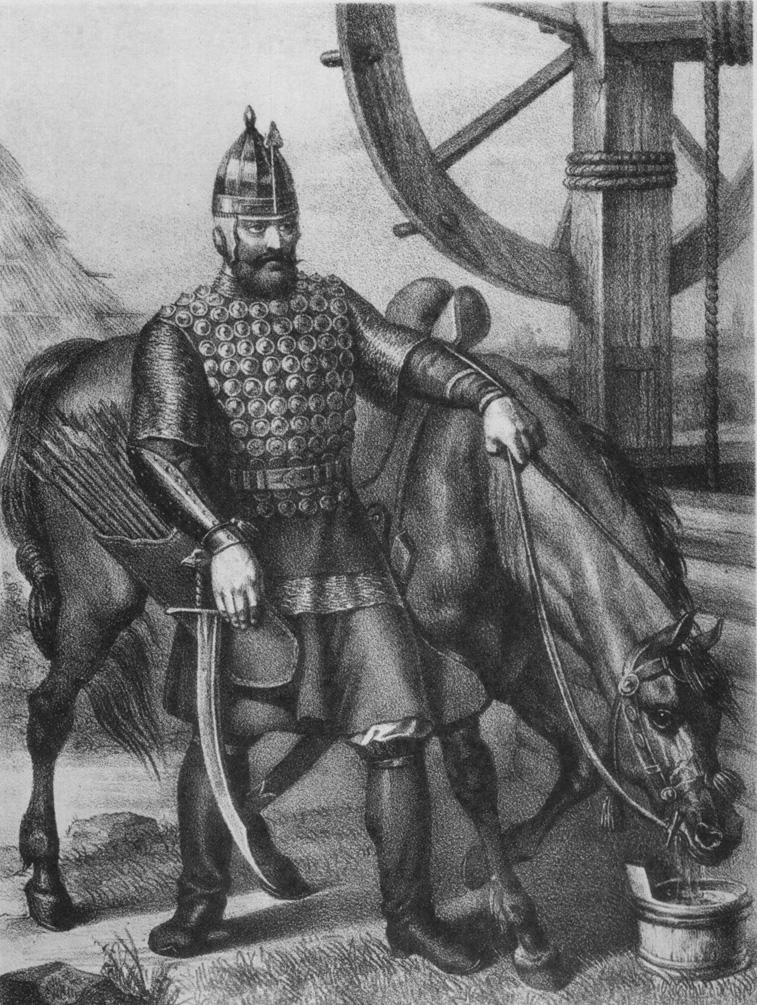
Nobleman in brigandine.

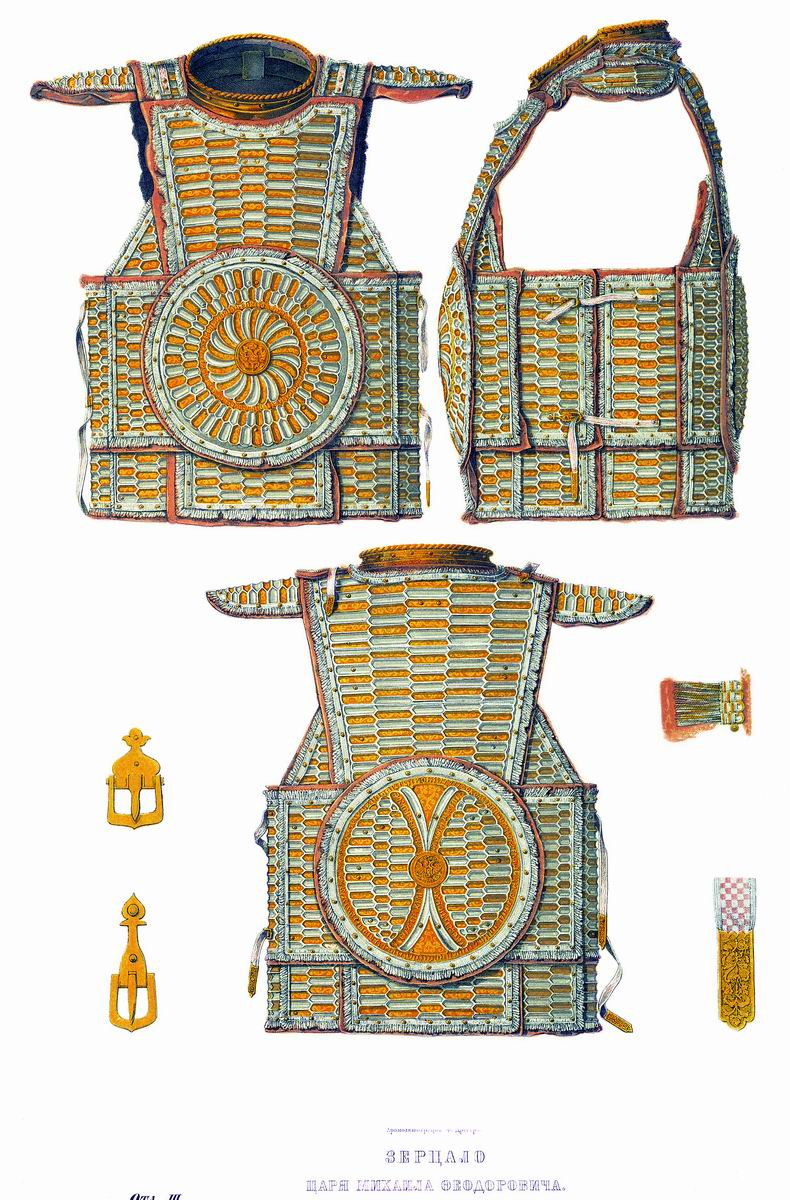
17th-century Russian mirror armour.

== Bibliography ==
- Perrie, Maureen (2006). The Cambridge history of Russia. Cambridge University. ISBN 9780521812276.
- Nicolle, David (1999). Armies of Medieval Russia 750-1250 (PDF). Osprey Publishing. ISBN 1-85532-848-8.
