= Battle of Toropets =

Battle of Toropets may refer to:

- Battle of Toropets (1580)
- Battle of Toropets (1609)
