= Battle of Torzhok =

1609 battle

- Part of Fight Against False Dmitry II
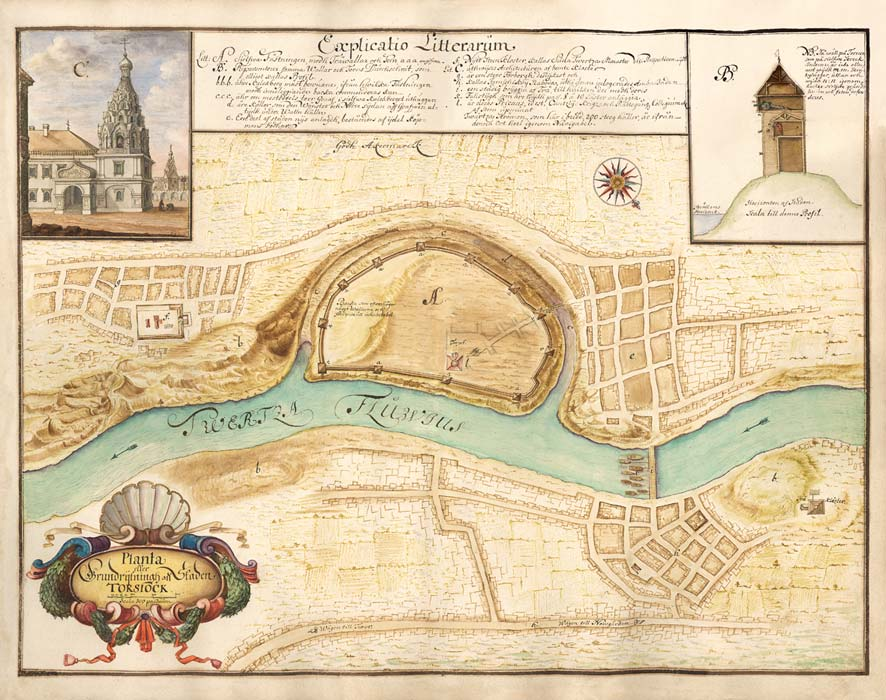
- Torzhok on a Swedish map of the 17th century
| Date | June 17, 1609 |
| Location | Torzhok, now Tver Oblast |
| Result | Russo-Swedish victory |

Belligerents
| False Dmitry II | Russian Kingdom; Sweden |

Commanders and leaders
| Alexander Zborovsky; Jan Kernozhitsky; Grigory Shakhovskoy | Kornila Cheglokov; Semyon Golovin; Evert Horn; Klaus Boy |

Strength
| 6,000 | 5,000 |

The Battle of Torzhok was a battle on June 17, 1609, between the advanced units of the Russian-Swedish army led by Prince Mikhail Skopin-Shuisky and Jacob De la Gardie and the army of Polish–Lithuanian invaders who fought for False Dmitry II, led by Alexander Zborovsky. It ended with the defeat of the interventionist troops and its retreat.

== Background ==
Sent by Tsar Vasily Shuisky, who was besieged in Moscow, Prince Mikhail Skopin-Shuisky entered into a Russian–Swedish Alliance in northern Russia, attracted an army of Swedish mercenaries to the side of Russia, and also assembled a Russian army. After the advance detachment, led by Fedor Chulkov and Evert Horn, defeated the intervention detachment, led by Jan Kernozitsky, at the Battle of Toropets, the Russian and Swedish armies marched from Novgorod and marched to Torzhok. The strategically important city itself was "deposited" from the impostor, and its wooden fortress was occupied by the 4,000-strong Russian–Swedish detachment of Kornila Cheglokov, Klaus Boy, and Otto Gelmer who had been sent in advance. Later, 1,000 warriors of Semyon Golovin and Evert Horn joined them.

The 13-thousand army of interventionists, pulled together under Torzhok in order to prevent the advance of Skopin-Shuisky's army to Moscow, consisted of an 8-thousand detachment of Kernozitsky (2 thousand Polish hussars, as well as 6 thousand Zaporozhian Cossacks and Tushins), two thousand Polish lancers of Zborowski, one thousand cavalry under the command of the Tushino governor Grigory Shakhovsky, as well as two thousand warriors from other Polish regiments. However, by the time of the battle near Torzhok, the interventionists managed to bring less than half of their troops to the city.

== Course of the battle ==
Zborovsky, who led the army of interventionists, tried to immediately take the city, but failed to because of the resistance of the garrison. The fire that arose in the wooden Kremlin was put out. To help Torzhok's garrison, a detachment of Golovin and Horn arrived. After that, the troops lined up against each other in battle formations. Zborowski began the battle with a massive attack of three companies of heavy armored cavalry. Two of them came across a deep phalanx of German infantrymen, bristling with long spears, and were forced to retreat, suffering heavy losses. However, the third company of attackers managed to crush the Russian and Swedish cavalry on the flank and drive it to the city walls. But the timely sortie from the city of governor Kornila Cheglokov helped restore the situation and allowed the retreating Russian-Swedish cavalry, together with the ripened forces, to launch a counterattack. The interventionists were forced to leave the battlefield. Having learned from the prisoners about the advance of a large army of Skopin-Shuisky, Zborovsky decided to retreat to Tver.

== Aftermath ==
Despite Jan Pyotr Sapieha's victorious reports about the large Russian–Swedish losses, the tactical situation spoke of the defeat of the interventionists. Having retreated to Tver, Zborovsky did not fulfill the task assigned to him – the capture of Torzhok and consolidation in it in order to block the way to the main forces of Skopin-Shuisky. Polish losses were unexpectedly large. It also became clear that the heavily organized cavalry was opposed by a well-organized and armed army capable of repelling its attacks in field battles. Large military formations were sent to help Zborovsky near Tver, which indicated great concern in the camp of the interventionists.

In Torzhok, meanwhile, the main army of Skopin-Shuisky and De la Gardie gradually gathered. From Smolensk came Prince Yakov Baryatinsky, sent by the governor Mikhail Shein, with four thousand warriors. Having formed regiments from the Russian-Swedish army, Skopin-Shuisky after some time marched in the direction of Tver, under the walls of which the Battle of Tver took place.

== See also ==
- De la Gardie campaign

== Sources ==
- Vadim Kargalov. Moscow Governors of the 16th–17th Centuries – Moscow: LLC "Russian Word" Trade and Publishing House, 2002 – Page 105
- Yaroslav Leontiev. Battles of Prince Skopin–Shuisky on Tver Land // Toropetskaya Land: Ancient and Modern. Materials of Local History Readings. 2003–2010 – The Seventh Letter, Tver, 2011 – Pages 219–230
