= Russian rank titles during the sixteenth and seventeenth centuries =

Russian rank titles during the sixteenth and seventeenth centuries determined the place of an official in the court and service hierarchy, and depended on birth and position. The system was divided into Duma ranks: boyars, okolnichys, duma nobility and duma clerks; Moscow ranks: stolniks, stryapchiys, Moscow nobility, diaks and zhilts; as well as the city nobility and the boyar scions. Knyaz was at this time a noble title that in itself had no rank.

== Boyar ==
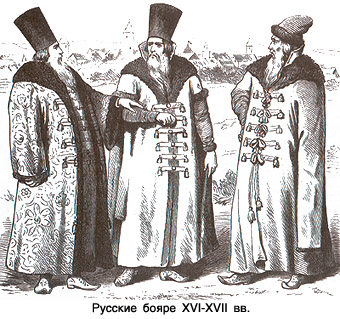
Boyars

Boyars (Бояре) were the highest class of feudal lords and nobles in the Russia in the 16th and 17th centuries. They were part of the Boyar Duma and held important administrative, legal and military positions (voievods, heads of prikazy). In the 16th century they were subject to oppression (oprichnina) under Ivan the Terrible, which limited their privileges. In the late 17th century their influence was finally undermined by the abolition of mestnichestvo (rank based on birth) in 1682 and the reforms of Peter the Great and the introduction of the Table of Ranks in 1722. The boyars were the pillars of power and were part of the Boyar Duma, which had from 13 members in 1630 to 63 in 1693. In the 17th century, the boyars gradually merged with the pomeshchiks (the service nobility), as the distinctiona between votchina (allodial estates) and pomestye (feudal estates) disappeared.

== Okolnichy ==
The okolnichys (Окольничий) were high-ranking court officials and the second most important rank after the boyar in the Duma hierarchy. The okolnichys were among the highest in Russia, headed prikazy, held military commands, and organized court ceremonies. During the 17th century, their importance remained high. They formed an important part of the pomeshchiks. As the autocracy strengthened, they, like the boyars, formed the backbone of the tsar's power. The rank of Okolnichy was often a stepping stone to the rank of Boyar. In the early 18th century, with the reforms of Peter the Great, the boyars and the related ranks, including the okolnichys, were gradually disappearing.

== Duma nobility ==
The Duma nobility (Думные дворяне) had the second lowest rank in the Boyar Duma. They participated in the meetings of the duma, headed prikazy, and were also appointed voievodes. Unlike the boyars, they had a lower rank of nobility, but they were the mainstay of tsarist power. They were appointed from the duma clerks, Moscow nobility, and stolniks from 1572. In the 16th century, they were few in number; in the 17th century their number increased and they were actively recruited from the lower nobility, which weakened the old boyar aristocracy. They could be elevated to Okolnichy. One of them was Keeper of the Seals. The number of nobles in the duma reached 40 in 1686, but this rank was abolished in the early 18th century.

== Duma clerk ==
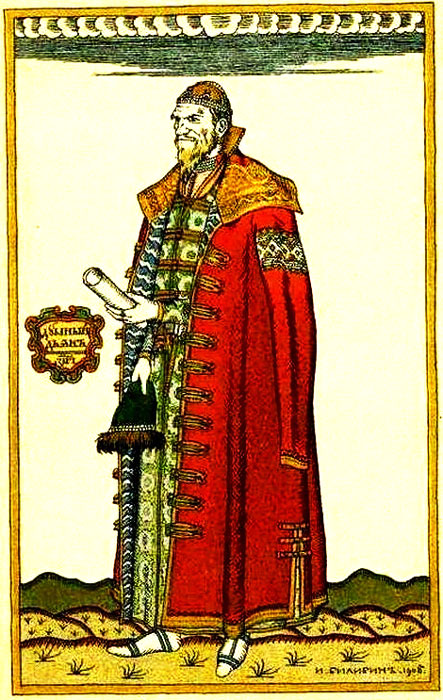
A Duma diak

Duma diaks (Думные дьяки) had the lowest rank in the Boyar Duma (the fourth after the boyars, okolnichys and the duma nobility). They participated in the meetings of the Boyar Duma, drafted resolutions, conducted state correspondence and drafted decrees. They were the heads of the most important prikazy: Ambassadorial Prikaz, Razryadny Prikaz, Pomestny Prikaz and the Privy Prikaz. They were actively involved in foreign policy, acted as ambassadors and conducted negotiations. Despite their importance, they often came from lower noble families or from non-noble clerks. They had higher rank than the Prikaz clerks, but lower than the Duma nobility.

== Stolnik ==
Stolniks (Стольники) were holders of court ranks and court offices in the Moscow principality and Russia from the 13th to the 17th centuries. Stolniks served at the princely table and also performed important state, military, and ambassadorial duties. In the 17th century, the stolniks ranked fifth – right after boyars, okolniks, duma nobles and duma deacons. In the 16th century, stolniks came from boyar families, and gradually the roles of the stolniks expanded beyond the court; they began to be appointed to important military and administrative positions. During the 17th century, their influence grew, the rank became prestigious, and numerous. Stolniks were often members of the highest nobility. They were often appointed voievodes of cities and regiments, and also led embassies. The rank was abolished by Peter the Great when the Table of Ranks was introduced.

== Stryapchiy ==
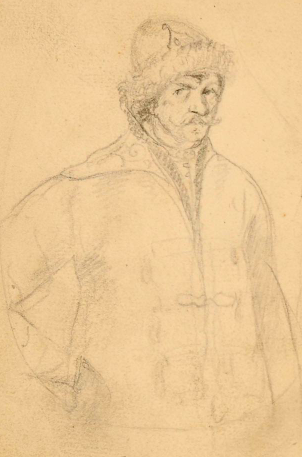
Streptsen Aleksey Savvich Romanchukov in 1638.

Stryapchiys (Стряпчий) held a rank one step below the stolniks and were considered to have a prestigious "Moscow rank". In addition to palace affairs, they performed military service (accompanying the Tsar on campaigns) and administrative duties. Over time, their number increased; if in 1616 there were 55 "court stryapchiys", then by the end of the 17th century there were hundreds of them.

== Moscow nobility ==
The Moscow nobility (Дворяне московские) was a privileged group among the service nobility of the 16th and 17th centuries, occupying a position between the Duma ranks and the shilts. They arose after 1550 (the chosen thousand) and were the tsar's main military and administrative support. They led regiments, embassies and chancelleries, and served as voivodes. Unlike the provincial nobility, the Moscow nobility served directly at court, received high salaries and the best fiefs. During the 17th century, their numbers increased significantly (over 2,400 in 1681), the rank became almost hereditary, and their duties became more complex. From the mid-17th century, the Moscow nobles were divided into those serving in the chancelleries and those leading the "regiments of the new order" (reiters, streltsy). At the end of the 17th century, in connection with the reforms of Peter the Great and the emergence of the table of ranks, the rank ceased to exist.

== Diak ==
Diaks (Дьяки), or clerks, served in local offices and in the prikazy (as heads or assistants). From the 15th century they were landowners. They were professional officials who played an important role in the country's governance, often descendants of Boyar scions. Under their leadership worked poddiaks (underclerks), who made up the bulk of the scribes.

== Zhilts ==
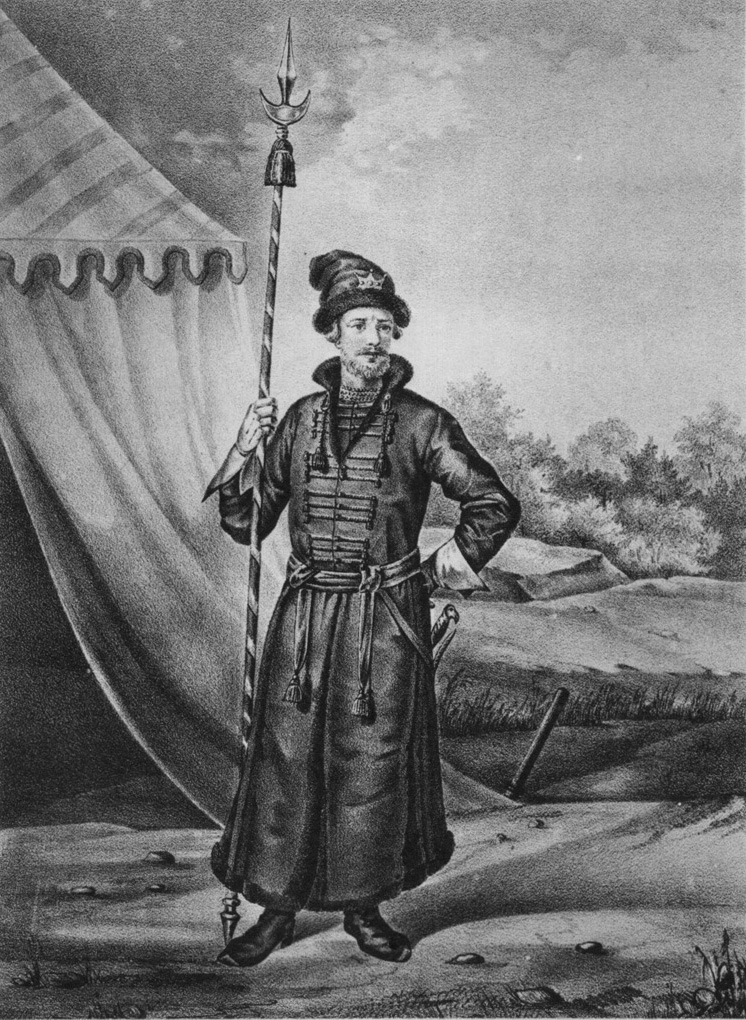
A zhilts in 1674.

The zhiltsy (Жильцы) were the elected (i.e. selected) nobles, a class of the service nobility, the lowest rank of the Moscow nobility. They occupied an intermediate position between the lower and the higher ranks (the Duma ranks). They were recruited from the city nobility and boyar scions, several thousand of whom were sent in rotation from all the cities to Moscow for three years, to protect the tsar, serve in the army, and perform certain court duties. They received a very important right: to be included in the Moscow list at the end of their service, which opened the way for them to higher court and Duma positions.

== City nobility ==
The city nobility (Городовые дворяне) formed the backbone of the Landed Army and were considered the elite among the provincial scions. They were descended from the former warriors of appanage princes who had lost their independence, as well as from boyar scions who had distinguished themselves in service. Their primary task was military service as part of the troops of the provincial cities (Kaluga, Vladimir and others). They formed the city cavalry detachments, which formed the core of the Russian cavalry. They went on campaigns "mounted, manned and armed" - with their own weapons, horses and serfs. In addition to war, the city gentry was involved in administrative and judicial affairs and served at embassies, as well as in the construction and defense of border towns. For their service they received pomestye (fiefs). Unlike the allodial estates of the boyars, the property of the city nobility could be confiscated if the owner did not appear for service. They were small landowners, inferior in wealth to the Moscow service nobility, but superior to ordinary boyar scionss.

== Boyar scion ==
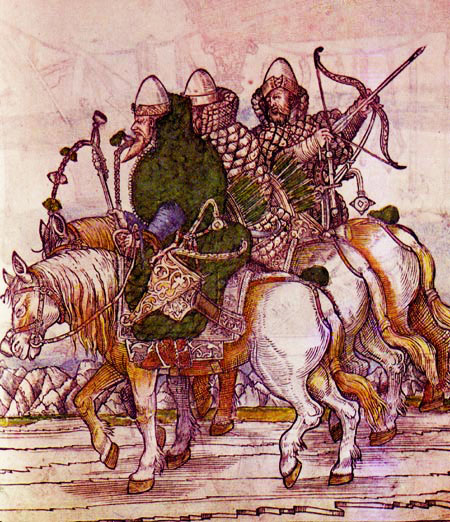
Boyar's sons in 1556.

Boyar scions (Дети боярские) were small and medium-sized pomeshchiks in the 16th and 17th century Russia. They formed the backbone of the cavalry and performed compulsory service for their lands (both fiefs and allodial estates) and their peasants. They occupied the lowest rank in the hierarchy after the nobility, were divided into court and provincial boyar scions according to where they served. In the 17th century, many became poor, became odnodvortsy (warrior peasants) and disappeared as a class under Peter the Great. In addition to military service (horsemen, servants and weapons), and service on the Great Zasechnaya cherta (the southern defense lines) and in the border guard, they also served as clerks to voievodes and church hierarchs. It was a hereditary class, but unlike the boyars, they did not hold higher offices. In the 17th century, many lost their serfs and farmed the land themselves. Boyar scions formed the basis of the provincial cities (Novgorod, Ryazan, etc.) and were the most important element of the Landed Army until the introduction of the New Order Regiments.
