= Voi (disambiguation) =

Voi is a town in Kenya.

Voi may also refer to:

- Voi Constituency, Kenya
- Voi shrew (Crocidura voi), a species of mammal in the family Soricidae, found in Africa
- The ICAO airline identifier for Volaris

VOI, as an acronym, may refer to:

- Value of information
- Variant of interest, a category used during the assessment of a new variant of a virus
- Voice of India, an Indian publishing company
- Voice of Indonesia, an Indonesian international radio service
- Volume of Interest

== See also ==
- "Voi Voi", the Norwegian entry in the Eurovision Song Contest 1960
- Voyi
