= Krzysztof Radziwiłł's raid on Russia =

- Part of the Livonian War
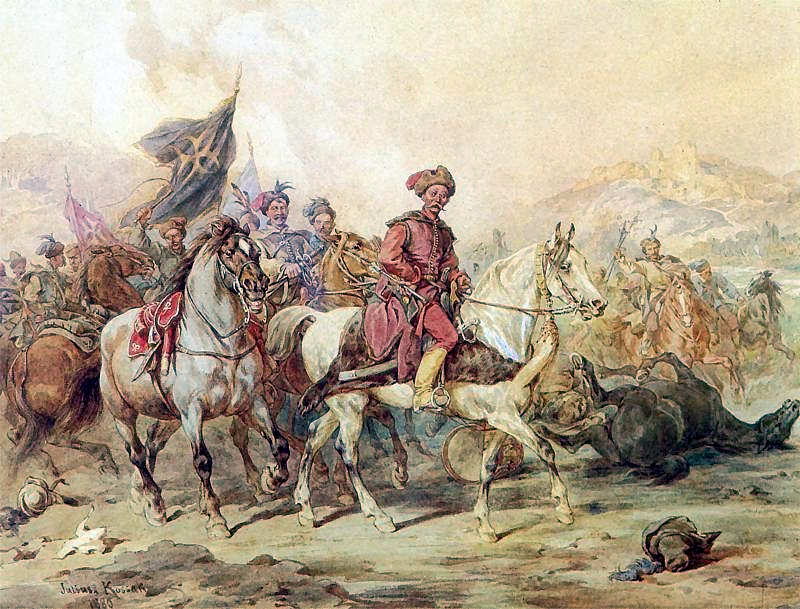
Date	August 5 – October 22, 1581
Location	Tsardom of Russia
Result	Polish–Lithuanian victory

Belligerents
Polish–Lithuanian Commonwealth	Tsardom of Russia

Commanders and leaders
Krzysztof Radziwiłł	Unknown

Strength
6,000 cavalry	Unknown

Krzysztof Radziwiłł's raid on Russia (Polish: Zagon Radziwiłla na Rosję) was a military raid on the Grand Duchy of Moscow led by Krzysztof Mikołaj "the Thunderbolt" Radziwiłł, Field Hetman of the Grand Duchy of Lithuania, during the final stages of the Livonian War (1558–1583). The raid started in conjunction with the preparation for the Siege of Pskov. It was a diversionary measure to protect the main Polish–Lithuanian forces at Pskov from a Russian attack. Radziwiłł's cavalry raided deep into the Grand Duchy of Moscow, reaching the Upper Volga. That made the raid one of the most distant Lithuanian raids. The raid was successful: Radziwiłł's men gained much loot, protected the main Polish–Lithuanian forces, and contributed to Tsar Ivan IV agreeing to negotiate the Truce of Jam Zapolski.

== Campaign ==
On July 10, 1581, while preparing for the Siege of Pskov, King of Poland and Grand Duke of Lithuania Stephen Bathory convened a military council. It was decided to send a cavalry regiment, commanded by Krzysztof Mikołaj Radziwiłł, into Orsha region and further. On August 5, Radziwiłł departed Vitebsk with about 4,000 men, which included the core of about 1,000 personal soldiers of Radziwiłł and a company of his father, Great Hetman Mikołaj "the Red" Radziwiłł. Initially, Radziwiłł's men raided Orsha region. Near Toropets, Radziwiłł's regiment was joined by mercenary and Cossack cavalry units of Filon Kmita, Voivode of Smolensk. The combined forces numbered some 6,000 soldiers.

Radziwiłł's men invaded and looted Smolensk region. Near the Shelom River, they faced two Muscovite armies. One was destroyed and the other's attacks were successfully repelled. Later Radziwiłł invaded Rzhev area, crossed the Volga River, burned Urdoma, and moved towards Staritsa where at that time Tsar Ivan IV was residing. On September 14, Radziwiłł was just three or four miles from Staritsa. Ivan evacuated his wife and children as well as the state treasury deeper into the Russian territory. However, Radziwiłł did not dare to attack Staritsa, one of the few brick fortresses in Russia, and retreated towards Lake Ilmen. On their way, Radziwiłł's men scored a victory near Toropets and ransacked Staraya Russa. On October 22, 1581, Radziwiłł reached besieged Pskov and rejoined the main Polish–Lithuanian forces.

== Aftermath ==
The Radziwiłł expedition burned six cities and numerous villages, took much loot and many prisoners. At Pskov they were greeted as victors. Soon the siege of Pskov turned into a passive blockade and Ivan IV sent a delegation to start peace negotiations.

The raid was lauded in many contemporary poems by Pranciškus Gradovskis (Franciszek Gradowski), Jan Kochanowski, Elijas Pilgrimovijus (Elijah Pielgrzymowski), Andrius Rimša (Andrzej Rymsza), and Jonas Radvanas (Jan Radwan). The raid earned Radziwiłł his 'thunderbolt' nickname.
