= New Order Regiments =

The New Order Regiments (Russian: Полки иноземного (нового) строя; also known in literature as foreign formation regiments) were professional military units formed in Russia in the 17th century, armed and trained in line with Western European armies.

== Background ==
The first attempts at Western military training in Russia were made by Mikhail Skopin-Shuisky in 1609, during the De la Gardie campaign.

In 1630, the Muscovite government began to hire mercenary officers in Sweden, the Netherlands, and Scotland to train a new, "foreign formation force" (inozemskii stroi) with new tactics. Six regiments of infantry (soldaty), a regiment of heavy cavalry pistoleers ("reitary"), and a regiment of dragoons (draguny) were formed from Muscovite peasant militiamen, Cossacks, service class cavalrymen and free volunteers from various social categories. Unlike traditional formation troops, the new regiments were outfitted and salaried at treasury expense.

== Formation ==
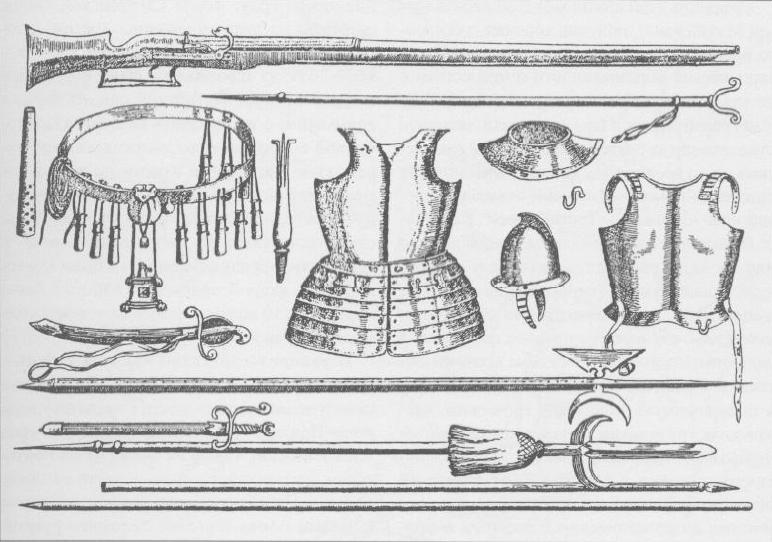
Gear of the polki novogo stroya, 1647

After the Smolensk War, most, but not all of the expensive "foreign formation regiments" had been disbanded. A few thousand "foreign formation" infantry and dragoons had manned the Abatis Line, but in 1646, the government decided to make "foreign formation" units an important permanent element in the army. A number of officers were hired abroad, especially in the Netherlands; a "war manual" on the exercise of musket and pike was translated into Russian, to help Muscovite infantry with training; a new census was conducted to levy troops by household (one from every 20–100 homes); and Tsar Alexis placed thousands of "state serfs" along the border in standing service as 'settled' dragoons and infantry, drilled in their villages year-round under foreign officers.

== Combat service ==
During the Russo-Polish War of 1654–1667, the number of the foreign formation troops grew (7 percent of the Muscovite army in 1651 and 79 percent in 1663). With the exception of the better-trained Reiter regiments, the "soldat" infantry was still of limited use on the battlefield. More importantly, though, these infantry regiments were conscripted from serfs and commoners, so it was easier to rebuild them than damaged units of traditional hereditary servitors–landed cavalry and streltsy.

== Organization ==
During the military reforms of 1648, four types of professional regiments were formed:

- Reiters, recruited from noblemen and hereditary servicemen. Heavy cavalry, armed with carbines, pistols, and sabers.
- Dragoons, recruited from Cossacks, Streltsy and peasants. Mounted infantry, armed with muskets, swords, and spears.
- Infantry ("soldaty"), recruited from "state serfs". Musketeers were equipped the same as Streltsy (muskets and bardiches), with the addition of swords and helmets. Pikemen wore helmets and breastplates but were discarded after 1660.
- Hussars emulated Polish Winged Hussars. Heavy cavalry, armed with pistols and lances.

Reiters and Hussars wore Western-style armor, at first imported, but after 1654 manufactured in Tula.
