= Military of Kievan Rus' =

Armed forces of medieval European state

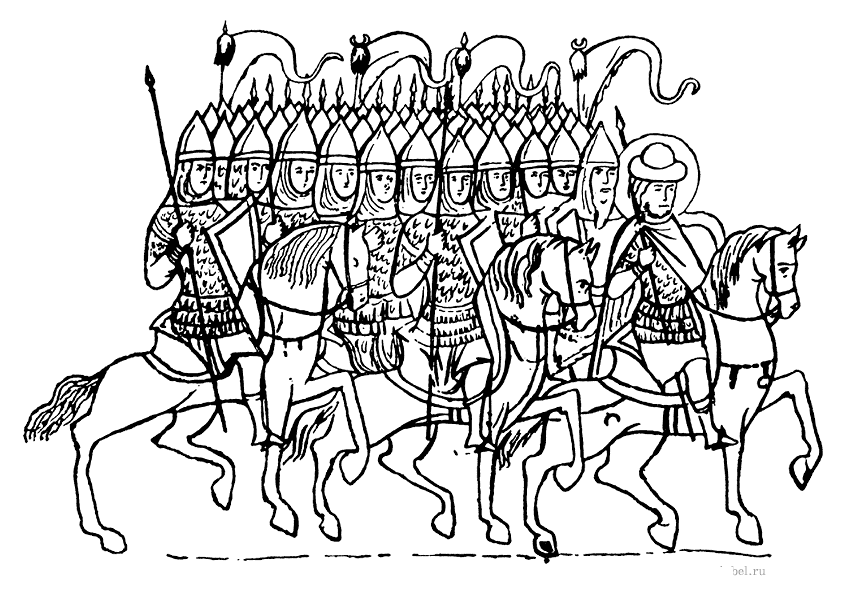
Druzhyna: princely cavalry.

The military of Kievan Rus' served as the armed forces of Kievan Rus' between the 9th to 13th century. It was mainly characterised by infantry armies of town militia that were supported by druzhyna cavalry.

== Composition ==
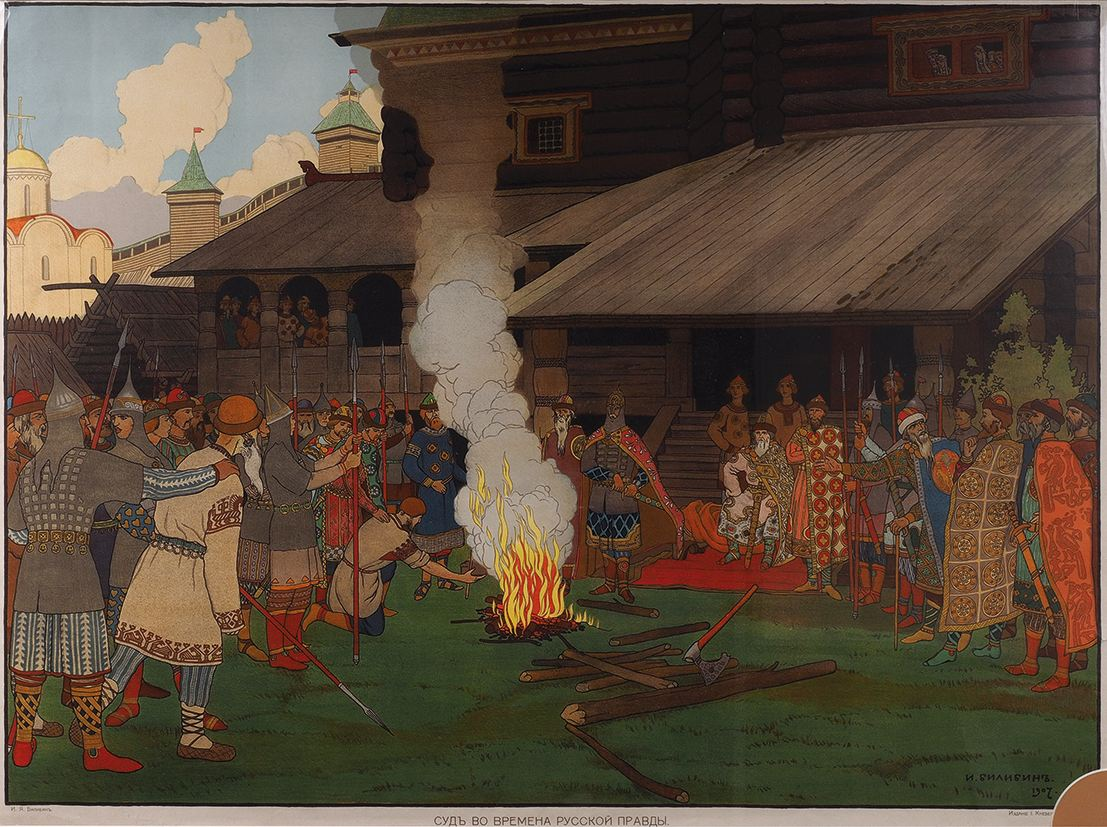
Warriors of Vsevolod I of Kiev (11th century)

Tribal militia known as voyi formed the basis of the army in Kievan Rus' until the tax reform of Olga of Kiev in the middle of the 10th century. In the subsequent period, under Svyatoslav I of Kiev and Volodimer I of Kiev, druzhyna played a dominant role. It consisted of senior members – the boyars – along with the rank-and-file ‘youths’ ("otroki").

The regiments of city militia, raised by the decision of the veche, were formed in the 11th century. These regiments received weapons and horses for a campaign from the prince.

== Tactics and equipment ==
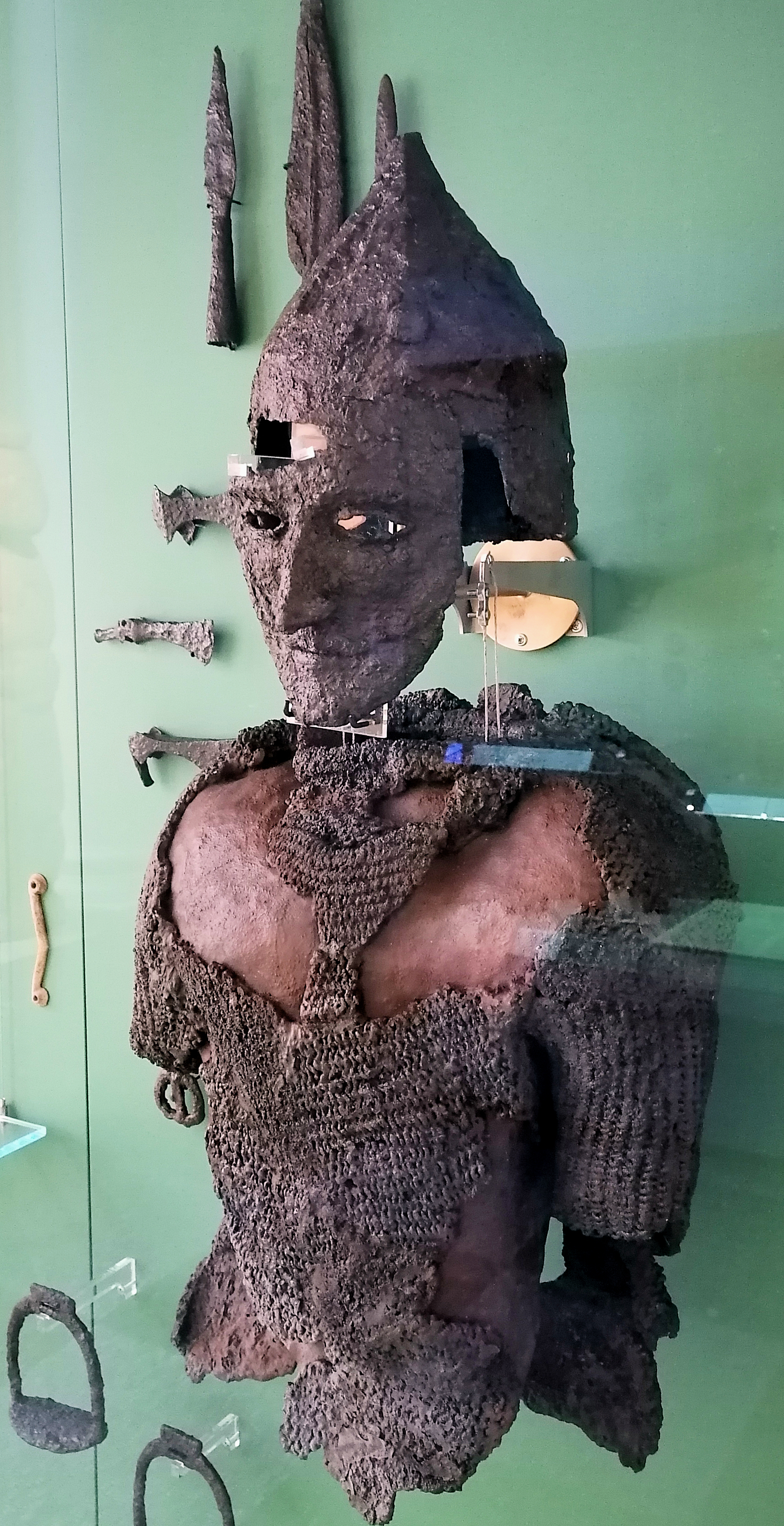
Rider armour and horse equipment. Iron, 12th–13th centuries, Lypovets, Vinnytsia Oblast, mound 264, military burial. Hermitage Museum.

Before Mongol invasion of Kievan Rus' in the 13th century, a Prince would be accompanied by his druzhyna, a small retinue of heavy cavalry, who would often fight dismounted (eq. Battle on the Ice). Massively heavy armour was used, mostly Scandinavian-style. However, these squads, as a rule, did not exceed the number of several hundred men, and were unsuitable for united actions under a single command.

At the same time, the main part of the Kievan Rus' army was the militia infantry. It was inferior to druzhyna in armament and the ability to own it. The militia used axes and hunting spears ("rogatina"). Swords were rarely used.

For the infantry, consisted of poorly armed peasants and tradesmen, numbers are uncertain. The only specific numbers mentioned for the Rus are 1,700 men of Evpaty Kolovrat (The Tale of the Destruction of Ryazan) and 3,000, men under Voivode Dorozh (Battle of the Sit River). However, these were exceptionally large numbers for Rus standards at the time. In 1242, Prince Alexander Nevski in Novgorod could muster no more than 1,000 druzhyna and 2,000 militia for the Battle on the Ice. So, it is safe to estimate that, on average, a Rus' prince had hundreds of warriors in his retinue, rather than thousands.

== Legacy ==
During the Mongol invasion of Kievan Rus' ( 1223, 1237–1241), many cities including Kiev were sacked, and the state definitively split into many independent Rus' principalities, some of which were completely destroyed. Remaining petty states were under growing pressure from Tatars, Sweden and Lithuania. Constant warfare precipitated the development of feudalism, and diminished the importance of the veche. The feudal militia, raised by the boyars-landowners and individual princes, came to replace popular militia. Princes (except in the Novgorod Republic) gathered and commanded the army. During the period of the Mongol invasions, the Rus' adopted much of Mongol military tactics and organization. While militia infantry still existed, they were, from the 14th century onward, mostly armed with ranged weapons, and delegated auxiliary duties, such as defending cities.

== See also ==
- Armies of the Rus' principalities
- Early Germanic warfare
- List of wars involving Kievan Rus'

== Bibliography ==
- Perrie, Maureen (2006). The Cambridge history of Russia. Cambridge University. ISBN 9780521812276.
