= Votchina =

Land estate that could be inherited

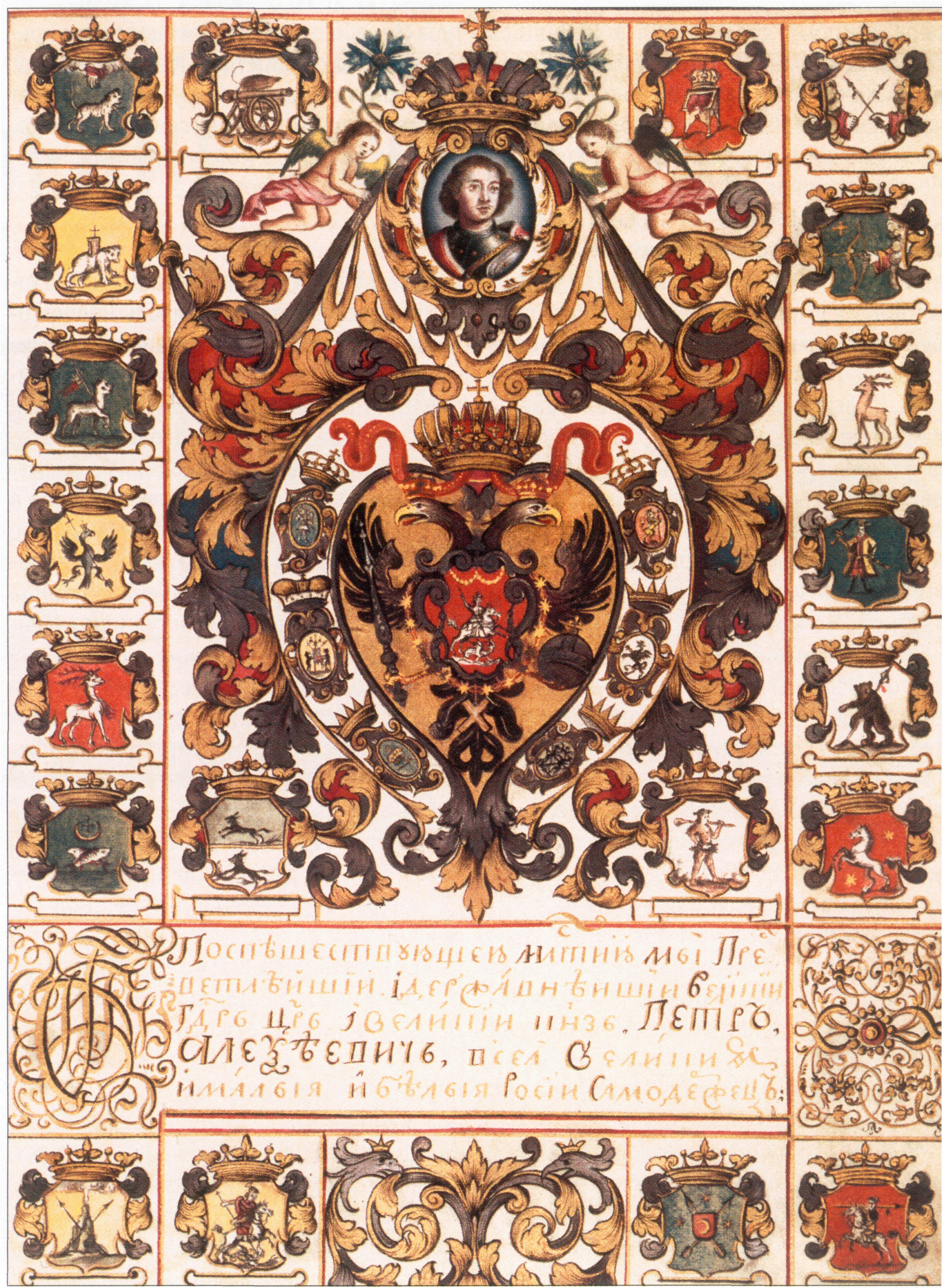
Title page of a charter of Peter I of Russia to Gavriil Golovkin, bestowing upon him a votchina (1711)

A votchina (Russian: во́тчина [ˈvottɕɪnɐ], pl. вотчины, votchiny), or otchina (Russian: о́тчина, from Russian отец (otets) 'father'), is a Russian term for a land estate that could be inherited, usually translated as 'patrimony'. The term votchina was also used to describe the lands of a prince (knyaz). The system disappeared in Russia largely due to reforms in the 18th century.

== Terminology ==
In medieval sources, noble landowners and princes would often refer to a votchina or otchina in connection to their own lands. The term votchina is now generally used in Russian historical terminology in reference to the main form of feudal landownership.

From the 15th century, there were two legally distinct forms of land that could be owned by Russian nobles: a votchina (hereditary land) and pomestye (service land). Service lands were given on condition of service, and so it reverted to the state upon the owner's death, while hereditary lands were considered to be family property. However, by the 16th century, it was common for sons or nephews to take over service land when the owner (pomeshchik) died or was unable to serve, with the continuation of military service. Until the mid-17th century, a pomestye could only be exchanged for another pomestye, but the Sobornoye Ulozheniye of 1649 allowed for pomestya to be exchanged for votchiny and vice versa.

== History ==
The term originated in the law of Kievan Rus'. An owner of a votchina, known as a votchinnik (Russian: вотчинник), not only had property rights to it, but also some administrative and legal power over people living on its territory. These people, however, were not serfs, as they had a right to freely move to different votchiny.

Later, the administrative and legal powers of owners of votchiny were severely limited, and then completely revoked. In the mid-15th century, the right of certain categories of peasants in some votchiny to leave their master was limited to a period of one week before and after Yuri's Day (November 26).

The Pomestnyi prikaz ("land department") was a government department (prikaz) that supervised hereditary estates (votchiny) in addition to service estates (pomestya). It also recorded the votchiny of the service estates, which were given to minor nobles in exchange for military service, and registered the dependent population and later any transactions concerning the estates. Like other departments, it handled the litigation of cases in its area. Votchiny first appeared as a distinct legislative subject in the Sudebnik of 1550. A council degree the following year also affected the ownership of votchiny by lay persons, but also princes in particular. The policy under Ivan IV of Russia greatly enlarged the pool of votchiny and enabled the tsar to reward servitors. In general, the rights of owners of hereditary estates earned through service (vysluzhennyye votchiny) were usually more restricted compared to those who owned ancestral estates, but still greater than owners of service estates.

The Sobornoye Ulozheniye of 1649 enacted during the reign of Alexis of Russia distinguishes between the deti boyarskiye (boyar scions) of old ancestry and other deti boyarskiye in connection with buying land and turning it into a votchina. Chapter 16 (on service lands) and Chapter 17 (on hereditary lands) in particular addressed the two main types of private landowning. As peasants were now tied to a land and enserfed, the fate of peasants who had fled from votchiny and pomestya was also regulated, with no restriction on the right to return fugitive peasants with force. Three types of votchiny appeared in the Ulozheniye: the old ancestral estates (rodovyye votchiny), estates granted for service (vysluzhennyye votchiny, votchiny za sluzhby dannyye), and bought estates (kuplennyye votchiny).

By the time of Peter I, pomestya and votchiny were treated as equivalent forms of landowning and a 1712 law prevented the surviving male in a family from selling or giving away the family's property to anyone who was not a part of the family. The Decree on Single Inheritance, published on 24 March 1714, merged votchiny and pomestya and stipulated that the estates could only be passed to one heir. During the reign of Catherine II, the Charter to the Nobility of 1785 granted nobles and their heirs the right to hold land without requiring state service.

== See also ==
- Appanage principality
- Russian rank titles during the sixteenth and seventeenth centuries

== Sources ==
- Blum, Jerome (21 April 1971). Lord and Peasant in Russia: From the Ninth to the Nineteenth Century. Princeton University Press. ISBN 978-0-691-00764-9.
- Farrow, Lee A. (1996). "Peter the Great's Law of Single Inheritance: State Imperatives and Noble Resistance". The Russian Review. 55 (3): 430–447. doi:10.2307/131793. JSTOR 131793.
- Feldbrugge, Ferdinand J. M. (2 October 2017). A History of Russian Law: From Ancient Times to the Council Code (Ulozhenie) of Tsar Aleksei Mikhailovich of 1649. BRILL. ISBN 978-90-04-35214-8.
