= Appanage principality =

Russian feudal term

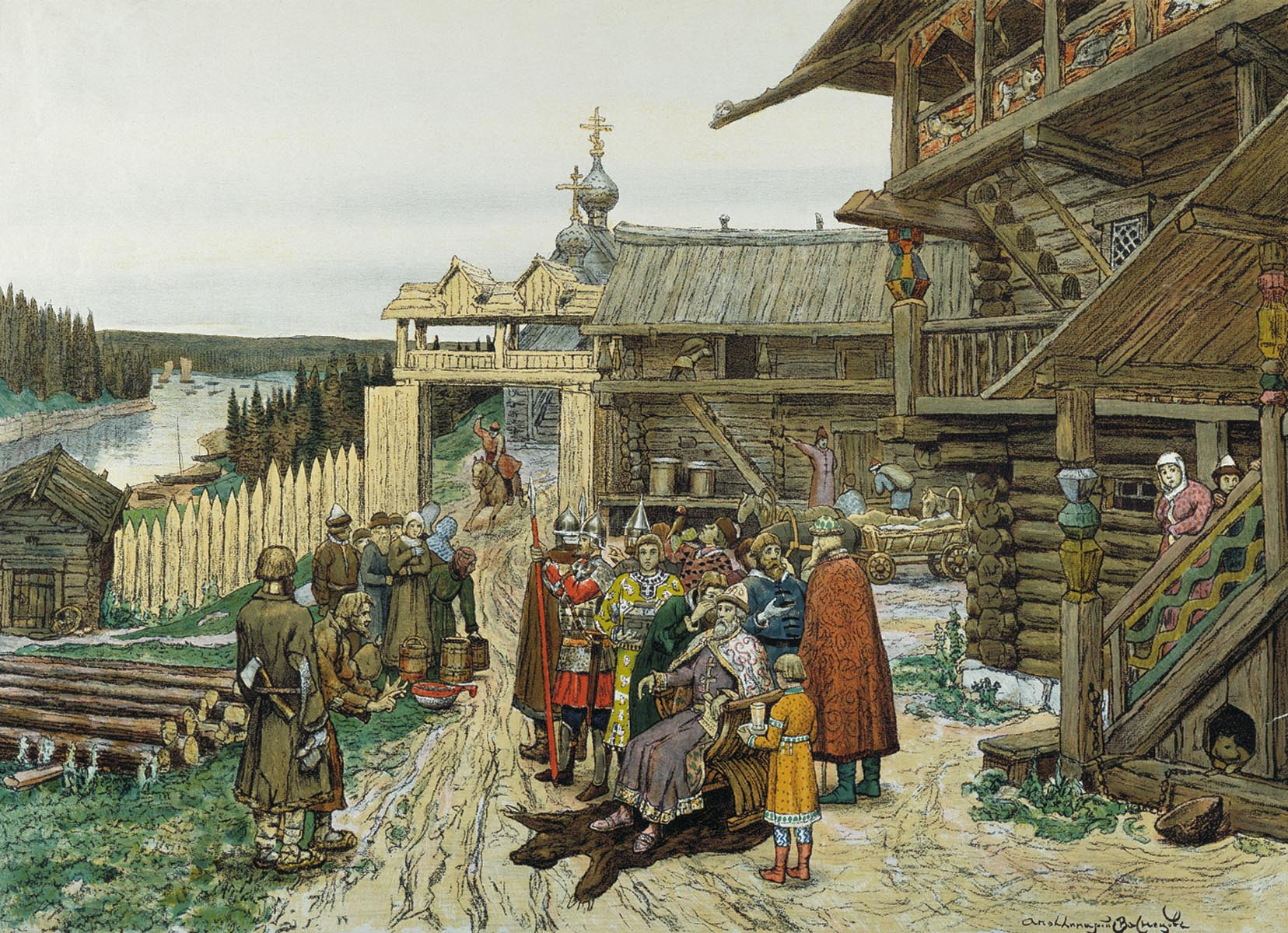
Court of an Appanage Prince by Apollinary Vasnetsov, 1908

An appanage principality (Russian: удельное княжество, romanized: udelnoye knyazhestvo), also known in Russian sources as an udel (Russian: удел, pl. уделы, udely), was a patrimony (votchina) belonging to a prince who was subordinate to another (capital) prince, or grand prince.

== History ==
Following the disintegration of Kievan Rus' and the beginning of the appanage period, independent principalities emerged. Their rulers often appointed subordinate princes to rule territories designated as appanage principalities. Russian sources frequently use the term for both, as independent principalities originated as appanage principalities. An appanage principality could later be transformed into an independent principality depending on factors such as political circumstances and the abilities of its ruler.

Upon the death of a prince, his principality was divided among his sons into appanage principalities (udely). The udel inherited by each son became his patrimony (votchina). When he in turn drew up his will, his udel was divided among his own sons, leading to the proliferation of smaller principalities, hence the name appanage period.

The term udel is first attested in sources dating to the mid-14th century. The term udelnyye knyazya (appanage princes) is attested in sources from the second quarter of the 15th century. In the Grand Principality of Vladimir, appanage princes existed in virtually all principalities. Appanage princes continued to exist in the Grand Principality of Moscow and in those principalities that remained independent.

Appanage princes did not have the right to form independent relations with the Golden Horde, although exceptions occurred during inter-princely struggles. In relations with the capital, or grand prince, an appanage prince had vassal obligations and therefore could not enter into treaties with anyone except other appanage princes within the same independent (or grand) principality. An appanage prince was also prohibited from laying claim to the lands of the capital (or grand) prince and had to personally participate in military operations under his command or send his voivode (military leader) under the command of the grand prince's voivodes.

The appanage period ended in the 15th century as the rulers of Moscow gradually became dominant and imposed their will on the other Russian princes. The practice also became more institutionalized, as the grand princes of Moscow would often assign appanage principalities to their younger sons. An appanage prince would rule his udel independently, except in matters reserved for the grand prince when the udel was assigned. By the late 15th century, many of these appanage principalities reverted to the crown upon the prince's death, despite being theoretically held in hereditary tenure. By the 16th century, appanage princes still held significant power over their subjects, including the right to collect taxes and administer low justice.

== See also ==
- Appanage
- District duchy

== Sources ==
- "Удел" . Brockhaus and Efron Encyclopedic Dictionary (in Russian). 1906.
- Crummey, Robert O. (6 June 2014) [1987]. The Formation of Muscovy 1300–1613. Routledge. ISBN 978-1-317-87200-9.
- Feldbrugge, Ferdinand J. M. (2 October 2017). A History of Russian Law: From Ancient Times to the Council Code (Ulozhenie) of Tsar Aleksei Mikhailovich of 1649. BRILL. ISBN 978-90-04-35214-8.
- Nazarov, V. D. (2009). "Князья удельные" [Appanage princes]. In Kravets, S. L. (ed.). Большая российская энциклопедия. Том 14: Киреев — Конго (in Russian). Большая российская энциклопедия. pp. 354–356. ISBN 978-5-85270-345-3. Archived from the original on 5 October 2025.
- Pipes, Richard (1995). Russia Under the Old Regime (2nd ed.). Penguin Publishing Group. ISBN 978-0-14-024768-8.
