= Pomeshchik =

Class of historical Russian landed gentry

In the history of Russia pomeshchiks (Russian: помещик) were the class of Russian nobility who owned a pomestye (Russian: поместье), i.e., an estate. The term pomeshchik is commonly translated in English as "landlord".

== History ==
It terms of land ownership, there used to be two major categories. In pomestye system, a sovereign (tsar or knyaz) could grant a piece of state-owned land to a person for his service (usually military) into personal ownership, for the term of the service or for life. Its temporary and conditional character constituted the difference from the votchina system, whereby land ownership was hereditary. Over time the two systems blended into one under the term pomestye ownership. This was finalized by Peter the Great in his 1714 Decree on Single Inheritance, whose main rule of law was inheritance of the real estate regardless its type by a single son, hence the name. It was influenced by the European concept of "Majorat". The "single inheritance" clause was amended in 1730 by Empress Anna of Russia, and the only consequence of Peter's decree left was unification of pomestye and votchina types of ownership.

== See also ==
- Russian rank titles during the sixteenth and seventeenth centuries
