= The Story of the Victories of the Moscow State =

Russian novel

- Author: Afanasy Loginovich Varaksin
- Language: Old Russian language
- Series: Literary Monuments
- Subject: Time of Troubles
- Genre: Chronicle
- Published: After 1626 / 1982
- Publisher: Nauka
- Website: Original Text; Translation With Сomments

The Story of the Victories of the Moscow State (Russian: Повесть о победах Московского государства), also known as The Tale of the Victories of the Moscow State, is a Russian literary work of the 17th century, a historical tale of the events of the Time of Troubles, mainly about the campaigns of the Smolensk noble militia and the struggle of the Smolensk nobles with Poles and supporters of False Dmitry.

== Original manuscript ==
The Tale of the Victories of the Moscow State was written in the literary language of the 17th century, which differs both from colloquial speech and the official language of the same time and reproduces the norms of the Old Russian language. The full title, "A Reliable Story About the Victories of the Moscow State, About How Many Misfortunes for the Multiplication of our Sins We Took from the Internecine War, from the Infidel Poles and from Lithuanians, and from Russian Rebels, and How the All-Merciful Lord God Saved Us from so Many Troubles with His Philanthropy and the Prayers of His Most Holy Mother and, for the Sake of All Saints, Brought Us Back with his Philanthropy to Its Original State".

The only manuscript of "The Tale of Victories...", is located in the Manuscript Division of the Russian National Library as part of the 18th century manuscript from the collection of Pogodin under number 1501. This manuscript (of a codex type, roughly of the A5 format) contains two independent works: The Legend of Boris Godunov and False Dmitriy I (sheets 1–17 turnover, covering events from 1584 to 1606) and the story of the Victories of the Moscow State itself (sheets 17–62 turnover covers events from 1606 to 1626). Some names of historical figures and geographical names were distorted by the census taker and are being restored from other sources.

In 1979, the text "The Tale of Victories..." was discovered and subsequently published by the historian Gennady Enin.

== Publication ==
Was published in 1982 as a separate publication in the series "Literary Monuments" with a circulation of 40,000 copies. The publication contains the original and translation into modern Russian, as well as a research article, comments, personal and geographical indications. Translation and comments made by Gennady Enin.

== Summary ==
The story begins with the Uprising of Bolotnikov in 1606 and ends with the solemn arrival in Moscow of an Orthodox shrine from Persia – the robes of Christ in 1626. In addition, the text contains references in 1514 and 1598.

The Tale describes in detail the campaign of the Smolensk noble militia to help besieged Moscow by Bolotnikov's troops in the fall of 1606, the campaign of the tsar's army against Kaluga and Tula in 1607, the war of Tsar Vasily Shuisky with False Dmitry II ("Tushinsky Thief") in 1608, the campaign of Prince Mikhail Skopin Shuisky against supporters of the impostor of 1609–1610. During this campaign, a certain Afanasy Loginovich Varishkin was able to deliver a convoy with food from the Alexander Sloboda to besieged Moscow and personally met with Tsar Vasily Shuisky. The Tale further describes the defense of Smolensk in 1609–1611, the capture of Tsar Vasily Shuisky and the events of the Interregnum, the liberation campaign of Minin and Pozharsky to Moscow in 1612, the election of Tsar Mikhail Romanov in 1613, unsuccessful campaigns near Smolensk in 1613–1617, the siege of Moscow by the Poles in 1618, the exchange of prisoners and the return to the homeland of Filaret Romanov in 1619, the arrival of Christ's Robe in 1626.

A distinctive feature of the story is the high appreciation of Tsar Vasily Shuisky as a righteous sovereign, as well as the exaltation of the role of the Smolensk nobility in the events of the Time of Troubles.

== Authorship of a work ==
A possible author of The Tale of the Victories of the Moscow State is one of its characters, Afanasy Loginovich Varaksin, who, by his non-christening name and patronymic, is Derevnya Varaksin, Son of Lonsky. In the genealogy of the Varaksins, it is said that Afanasy Loginovich, on behalf of Skopin-Shuisky, delivered a convoy with food to Moscow besieged by the Tushins. The Tale details this episode and the meeting of Athanasius Loginovich with Tsar Vasily.

Athanasius, nicknamed the Derevnya, Varaksin, was a Smolensk nobleman, in 1605/06 had a local salary of 400 quarters of land. In May 1608 he was wounded near Bolkhov, was captured and taken to the Commonwealth. By 1609, he returned from captivity and took part in the campaign of Skopin-Shuisky against False Dmitry. After the liberation of the Alexandrovskaya Sloboda, Athanasius was sent to starving Moscow with grain reserves. In the capital, Tsar Vasily Shuisky himself granted him service, the meeting with which became Athanasius the pinnacle of his career. The activity of Athanasius during the years of the interregnum is unknown, probably, like other Smolensk nobles, he participated in the militia of Minin and Pozharsky from 1611–12 and in the liberation of Moscow from the Poles. In July 1618, he was secondly wounded and taken prisoner during the battle of Borovsk. In 1619 he participated in the exchange of prisoners in Vyazma. In 1621/22, he had a local salary of 750 quarters of land and a monetary salary of 34 rubles. He died from his wounds until 1630. He left three sons: Ivan, Fedor and Vasily.

If Athanasius Varaksin can be recognized as the author of "The Tale of Victories", then the years 1626–29 should be considered the time of the creation of the monument.

=== Interesting facts ===
The Tale glorifies the courage of the Smolensk, but one of the most important events of the Time of Troubles – the defense of Smolensk in 1609–1611 – is described rather briefly, since the Smolensk noble army during the siege of the city by the Poles was on a campaign led by Prince Skopin-Shuisky, and the defenders of Smolensk became ordinary citizens (posad people).

== Sources ==
- The Story of the Victories of the Moscow State. Publication of Gennady Enin. Original Text and Translation With Comments
- Desyatnya of 7114 about Smolensk // Vladimir Maltsev. The Struggle for Smolensk (16th–17th Centuries). Smolensk Regional State Publishing House. 1940. Page 362–393
- Gennady Enin. "The Tale of the Victories of the Moscow State" – a Newly Found Monument of Old Russian Literature
- Alexander Molochnikov. Genealogy of the Varaksins and "The Tale of the Victories of the Moscow State" // Time of Troubles in Russia at the Beginning of the 17th Century: the Search for a Way Out. To the 400th Anniversary of the "Council of the Whole Land" in Yaroslavl. Materials of the International Scientific Conference. Yaroslavl, June 6–9, 2012. Moscow, 2012. Pages 326–330
- Monuments of the Defense of Smolensk (1609–1611) / Under the Editorship and With the Preface of the Full Member Yuri Gauthier – 1912
- The Genealogy of the Oryol Nobles of the Maslovs // Chronicle of the Historical and Pedigree Society in Moscow. Issue 4. Moscow, 1907. The Maslov Family at the Genealogical Forum of the All-Russian Genealogical Tree
