= Kholop =

Feudal serf in Kievan Rus' and Muscovy

A kholop (Ukrainian and Russian холо́п; Russian pronunciation: [xɐˈlop], Ukrainian pronunciation: [xoˈɫɔp]) was a type of feudal serf in Kievan Rus' from the 9th to early 12th centuries. The legal status of kholops in the 16th-century Tsardom of Russia was essentially the same as slaves.

== Etymology ==
The word холо́п was first mentioned in a chronicle for the year 986. The word is cognate with Slavic words translated as "man" or "boy" (Ukrainian: хлопець (khlopets), Polish: chłopiec, Bulgarian: хлапе / хлапак (hlape / hlapak) "kid"). Chlap (pronounced [xlap]) is a synonym for "man" in Slovak (chlapec "boy" thus being the diminutive). Such transitions between the meanings "young person" and "servant" (in both directions) are commonplace, as evident from the English use of "boy" in the sense of "domestic servant".

== History ==
=== In Kievan Rus' ===
The Russkaya Pravda, a legal code of the late Kievan Rus', details the status and types of kholops of the time.

In the 11th–12th centuries, the term referred to different categories of dependent people and especially slaves. A kholop's master had unlimited power over his life, e.g., he could kill him, sell him, or transfer ownership of him to settle a debt. The master, however, was responsible for a kholop's actions, such as insulting a freeman or stealing.

A person could become a kholop as a result of capture, selling oneself, being sold for debts, after having committed crimes, or through marriage to a kholop. Until the late 15th century, the kholops represented a majority among the servants, who had been working lordly lands. Some kholops, mainly house serfs, replenished the ranks of the princely servants (including those in the military) or engaged themselves in trades, farming, or administrative activities.

=== In the Tsardom of Moscow ===
Throughout the 16th century, the role of the kholops in the corvée economy of the Principality of Moscow had been diminishing due to the increasing involvement of peasant exploitation of labour. At the turn of the 16th century, the service class kholops (служилое холопство, sluzhiloye kholopstvo) began to emerge and spread across the country. In the late 17th century, there were also kholops "implanted" to their land (посаженные на землю, posazhenniye na zemlyu), who took care of their own household and had to pay chynsh (similar to quitrent). Those kholops who had been house serfs were subject to poll tax (per-soul tax, podushnaya podat) in 1722–1724, and were thereafter treated as ordinary serfs (krepostnyye, "permanent peasants").

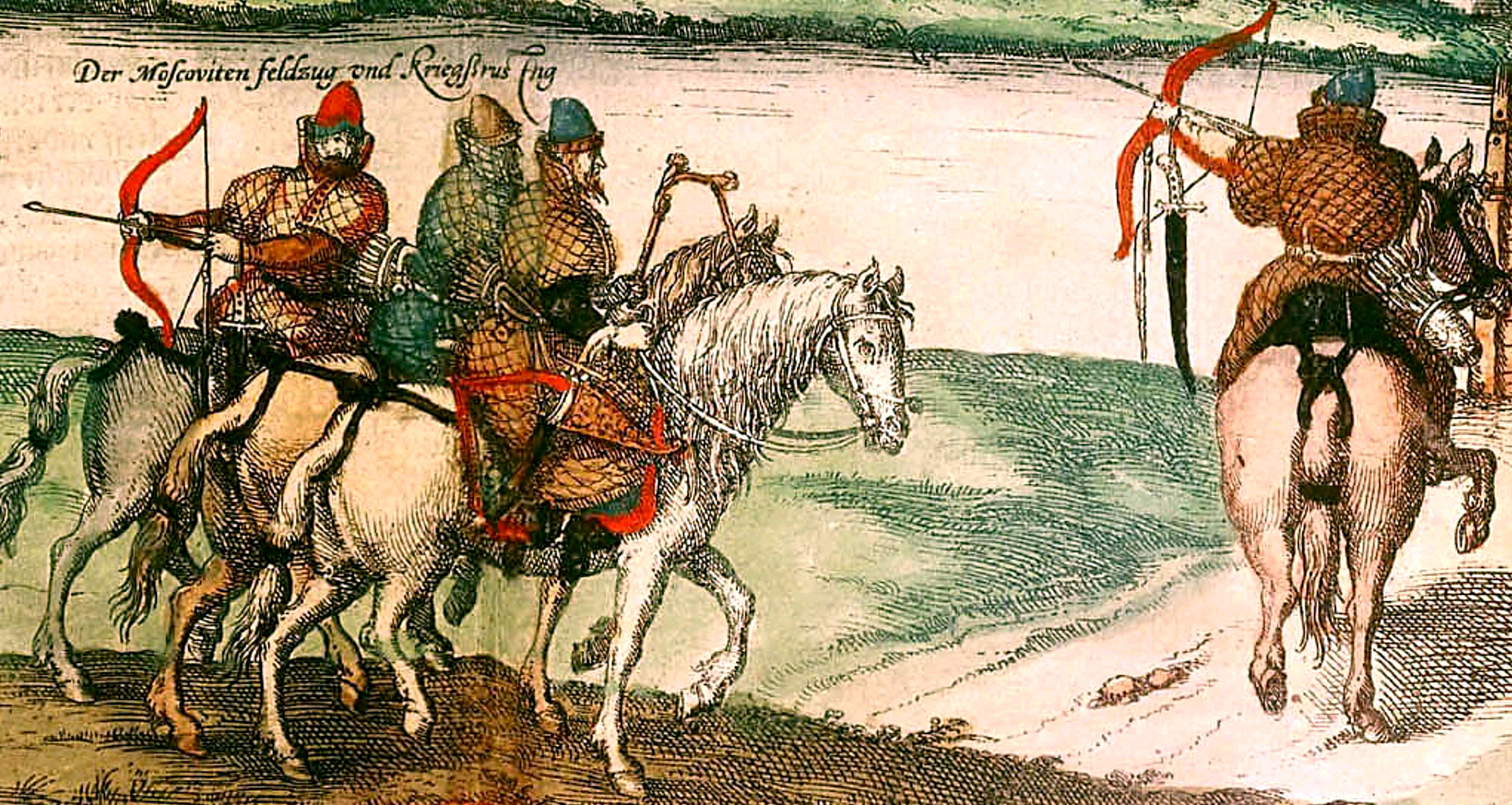
Combat kholops in the 16th century.

Boevie kholopi (Russian: боевые холопы, "combat slaves"), also known as "military slaves" in literature, constituted an armed retinue and personal protection for large and medium-sized landowners in the 16th–18th centuries, and carried out military service together with noblemen, constituting a considerable part of the "Landed Army". They were equipped as mounted archers, usually wearing cheap quilted armor and caps.

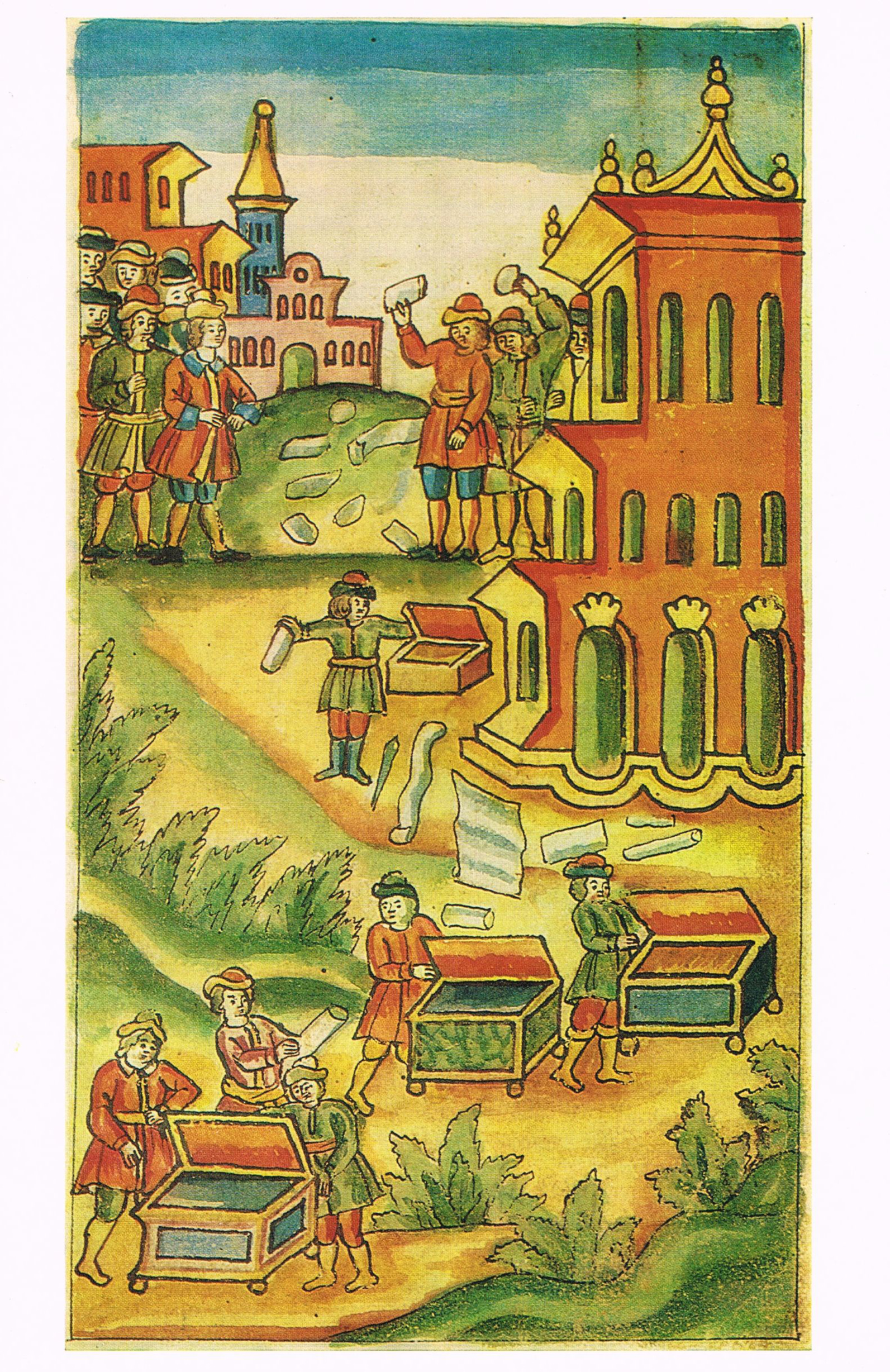
The 1682 destruction of the Kholop Prikaze

"Kabala people" was a variation of kholops in Muscovy of 15th–17th centuries. This category of unfree population came under the "kabala" (heavy debt bondage) condition following a monetary loan for percentage of which it had serve its creditor until completion of the debt payment. Legal status of the Kabala kholops was regulated by general kholops norms and laws Sudebnik of 1550, Sobornoye Ulozheniye of 1649. After the Ukaze of 1 February 1597, the principle of the kholop's servitude until the death of his / her creditor was enacted. Over time, all types of kholops were placed to the category of Kabala kholops. Agreements on Kabala kholops were inscribed in "Kabala books".

== See also ==
- Chłopomania or Khlopomanstvo
- Kholop (film)
