= Battle of Toropets (1609) =

- Part of Russian–Polish War (1609–1618)
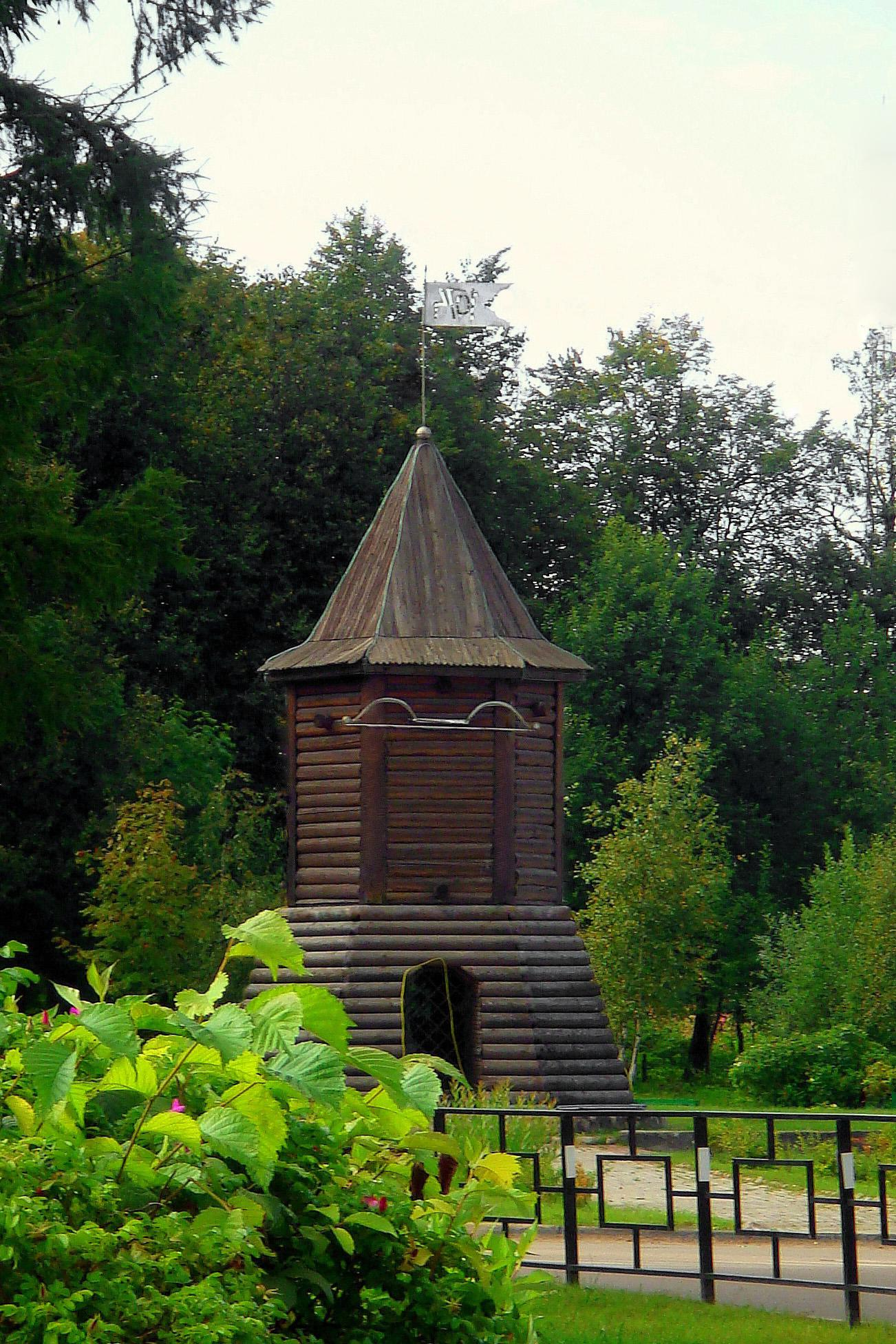
- Watchtower in Toropets
Date	May 25, 1609
Location	Toropets, now Tver Oblast
Result	Russo-Swedish victory

Belligerents
False Dmitry II	Russian Kingdom; Sweden

Commanders and leaders
Jan Kernozhitsky	Fedor Chulkov; Evert Horn

Strength
6,000	3,000–4,000

The Battle of Toropets (also the Battle of the Village of Kamenka) was a battle on May 25, 1609, between the Russian–Swedish detachment and the detachment of Polish hussars and Cossacks of Pan Kernozitsky, which ended in the defeat of the latter.

== Background ==
Prince Mikhail Skopin-Shuisky sent by Tsar Vasily Shuisky to Novgorod managed to negotiate with the Swedes for military support against the Polish–Lithuanian magnates and False Dmitry II, concluding a Vyborg Treaty with Jacob De la Gardie. Skopin-Shuisky also managed to gather the Russian army and reclaim from the impostor a number of northern cities. In early May, advanced Russian–Swedish detachments marched from Novgorod to clear the way to Torzhok for the main army. Under their onslaught, the leader of the Polish Hussars detachment Kernozitsky left Russa without a fight, which allies occupied on May 20. After that, the invaders suddenly attacked them, but were repelled. The Russian–Swedish detachment, led by Fyodor Chulkov and Evert Horn, continued the offensive and approached Toropets.

== Course of the battle ==
On May 25, near the village of Kamenka, a battle took place with the hussars and Cossacks of Kernozitsky taken aback. At the first blow of the armored infantry of Horn, Kernozitsky's army fled, and the noble cavalry of Fyodor Chulkov completed the rout. With the remnants of the detachment, Kernozitsky tried to sit outside the walls of the nearby Trinity Nebin Monastery, but was attacked and knocked out of it. The interventionists, leaving artillery, left Toropets, who immediately "set aside" from the "Tushinsky thief".

== Aftermath ==
After the capture of Toropets by the Russian–Swedish detachment, a chain reaction began. Torzhok, Staritsa, Ostashkov, Rzhev, Zubtsov, Kholm, Nevel, and other northwestern Russian cities "set aside" from False Dmitry II. Thus, for the advance of the army of Skopin-Shuisky and De la Gardie to Moscow, the right flank was reliably covered.

== See also ==
- De la Gardie campaign

== Sources ==
- Kargalov, Vadim (2002). Moscow Governors of the 16th–17th Centuries. Moscow: Russian Word. ISBN 978-5-9932-0804-6.
- Shkolnik, Julia (2012). Generals of Russia. Complete Encyclopedia. Eksmo. ISBN 978-5-699-58196-2.
