= Battle of Toropets (1580) =

- Part of the Livonian War
Date	September 20, 1580
Location	Toropets, (Russia)
Result	Polish–Lithuanian victory

Belligerents
Polish–Lithuanian Commonwealth	Tsardom of Russia

Commanders and leaders
Janusz Zbaraski	Dimitrij Cheremisov (POW); Grigorij Nashchokin (POW)

Strength
2,600 men	4,000 men

Casualties and losses
Very few	300–500 killed 200 captured

The Battle of Toropets was fought during the Livonian War, between Polish–Lithuanian Commonwealth and the Tsardom of Russia in September 20, 1580. Polish-Lithuanian Commonwealth forces under the command of Janusz Zbaraski defeated the Russian forces commanded by Dimitrij Cheremisov and Grigorij Nashchokin.
