= Mikhail Skopin-Shuisky =

Russian statesman (1586–1610)

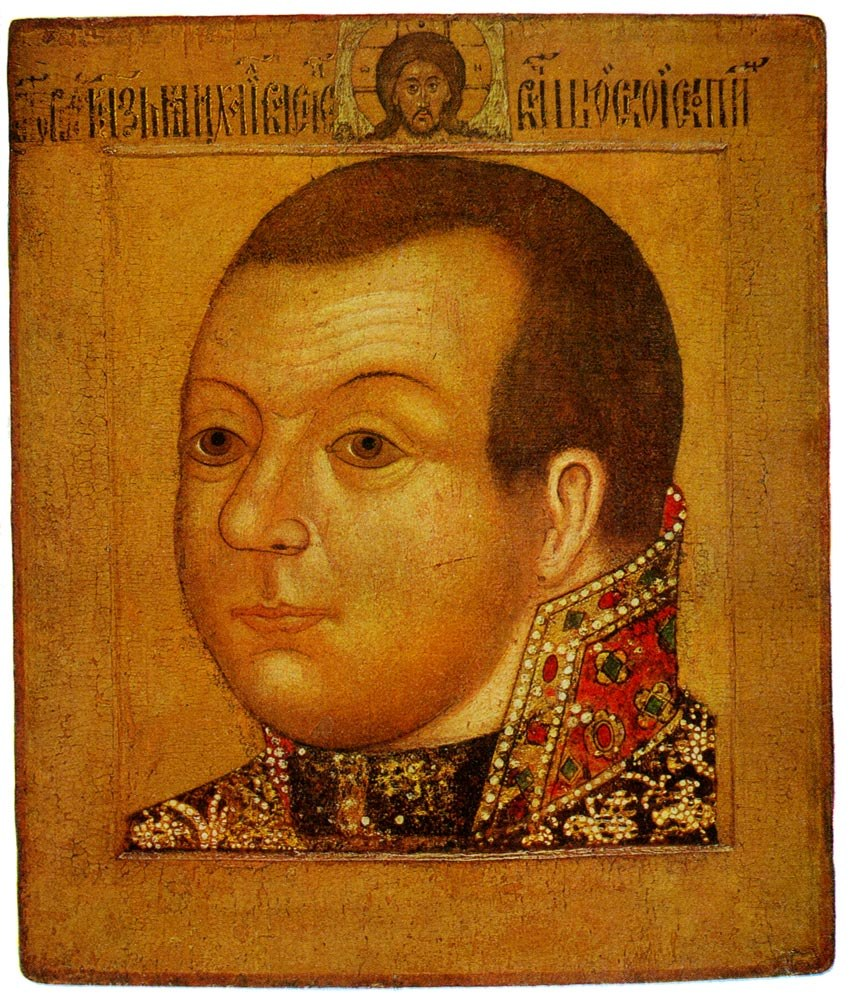
Later reproduction of a parsuna (portrait) of Skopin-Shuisky

Prince Mikhail Vasilyevich Skopin-Shuisky (Note: In this name that follows East Slavic naming customs, the patronymic is Vasilyevich and the family name is Skopin-Shuisky.) (Russian: Михаил Васильевич Скопин-Шуйский; 18 November [O.S. 8 November] 1586 – 3 May [O.S. 23 April] 1610) was a Russian statesman and military figure during the Time of Troubles. He was the last representative of a cadet branch of the Shuysky family.

== Life ==
Having lost his father, Vasili Feodorovich Skopin-Shuisky, at an early age, Mikhail Skopin-Shuisky was educated by his mother. During the reign (1598–1605) of Boris Godunov, he was appointed stolnik (tsar's assistant). False Dmitriy I made Mikhail his mechnik (sword carrier), and asked him personally to bring Marfa Ivanovna – mother of the future Tsar Mikhail I – to Moscow from exile. During the reign of Tsar Vasili IV (1606–1610), Skopin-Shuisky became a close associate of his cousin, the tsar.

== Military career ==
He began his military career in 1606 with the appearance of Ivan Bolotnikov, whom he would defeat twice, first near the Pakhra River with a small unit at his disposal (after Bolotnikov had crushed the Muscovite army led by Mstislavsky and other boyars) and then at Kotly. After the second defeat, Bolotnikov and his men fled to Tula. Skopin-Shuisky took an active part in a successful siege of Tula alongside the Muscovite army.

When False Dmitriy II appeared on the political horizon, Vasili IV decided to seek help from the Swedes and sent Skopin-Shuisky to Novgorod to negotiate with them. Despite some obstacles, Skopin-Shuisky managed to persuade the Swedes to help the Russian tsar.

On 14 April 1609, Skopin-Shuisky left Novgorod with 12,000 Swedish soldiers under the command of Jacob De la Gardie to save the Russian throne. Skopin-Shuisky captured Oreshek, Tver and Torzhok and cleared the north of the country from the enemies. He defeated Hetman Jan Piotrus Sapieha at Kalyazin and made him abandon the Siege of the Troitse-Sergiyeva Lavra.

Mikhail's actions were often impeded by lack of funding for the Swedish mercenaries and necessity to train his own army. Nevertheless, many supporters of False Dmitriy II chose to flee at the sight of Mikhail's army and this gained him a reputation of the saviour of the fatherland.

According to Chester Dunning, "In March 1610, Tsar Vasili's brilliant nephew Skopin-Shuiskii made a triumphal entry into the capital widely hailed as the hero who had ended the siege of Moscow and eliminated the longstanding threat posed by Tushino. Skopin-Shuiskii was by this time far more popular than Tsar Vasilii and was being secretly promoted by Prokofi Liapunov and others as the next tsar. Although Skopin-Shuiskii immediately rejected the radical idea of toppling his uncle, the paranoid tsar learned about his nephew's flirtation with treason."

== Death ==
Skopin-Shuiskii died mysteriously, less than a month after a private meeting with Tsar Vasili. According to Dunning, "Many people claimed that he had been poisoned by a jealous relative, either the tsar himself or his brother Dmitrii - who was, in fact, hoping to succeed the childless ruler some day. Few people believed the tsar sincerely mourned the loss of his nephew, and many suspected him of involvement in murder."

== See also ==
- Dmitry Pozharsky
- Prokopy Lyapunov
