= Voyi =

Category of armed forces in Kievan Rus'

The voyi (singular voi or voy) formed a category of armed forces in Kievan Rus'.

Unlike the standing force (the druzhina), the voi force was drafted from a local population. Alongside the druzhina, the voyi formed a basis of an army in Rus'. A prince (knyaz) would appoint a voivode (from voi - "army", and vode - "to lead", meaning "warlord") to command them.
