= Service class people =

Freemen in early modern Russia

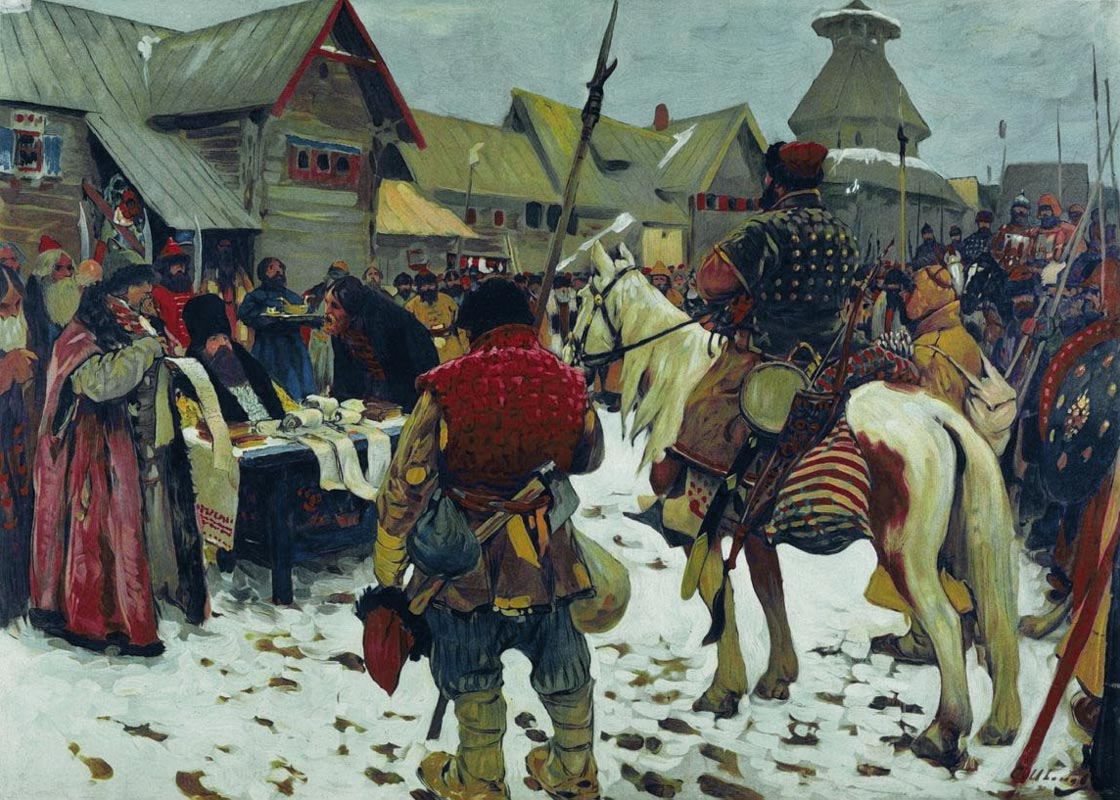
Military review of service people.

Service class people (Russian: служилые люди, romanized: sluzhilyye lyudi) were a class of free people in Russia in the 14th to the 17th centuries, obliged to perform military or administrative service on behalf of the state.

== Background ==
There were two main groups of service people:

- hereditary servitors ("servitors by birth"), included boyars, noblemen and "Boyars' children". They served in the "Landed Army", and received land and serfs for their service.
- chosen servitors ("servitors by contract"), included streltsy, Cossacks and clerks. They served in the infantry or administration, and were paid in coin.

In early Siberia, service-men and promyshleniks (promyshlenniki) were the two main classes of the Russian population. Service-men were nominally servants of the tsar, had certain legal rights and duties and could expect pay if they were lucky. Promyshleniks were free men who made their living any way they could.

A minor group were sworn-men (tseloval'niki, literally [cross or bible] 'kissers'). These men swore an oath and gained certain rights and duties.

In practice the groups blended into each other, and the distinction was most important when dealing with the government. When petitioning the tsar, a service-man would call himself 'your slave' and a promyshlenik 'your orphan'. These people were often called Cossacks, but only in the loose sense of being neither landowners nor peasants.

== See also ==
- Boyar scions
- Kholop
- Voivode
