= Aleksander Zborowski =

16th-century Polish noble

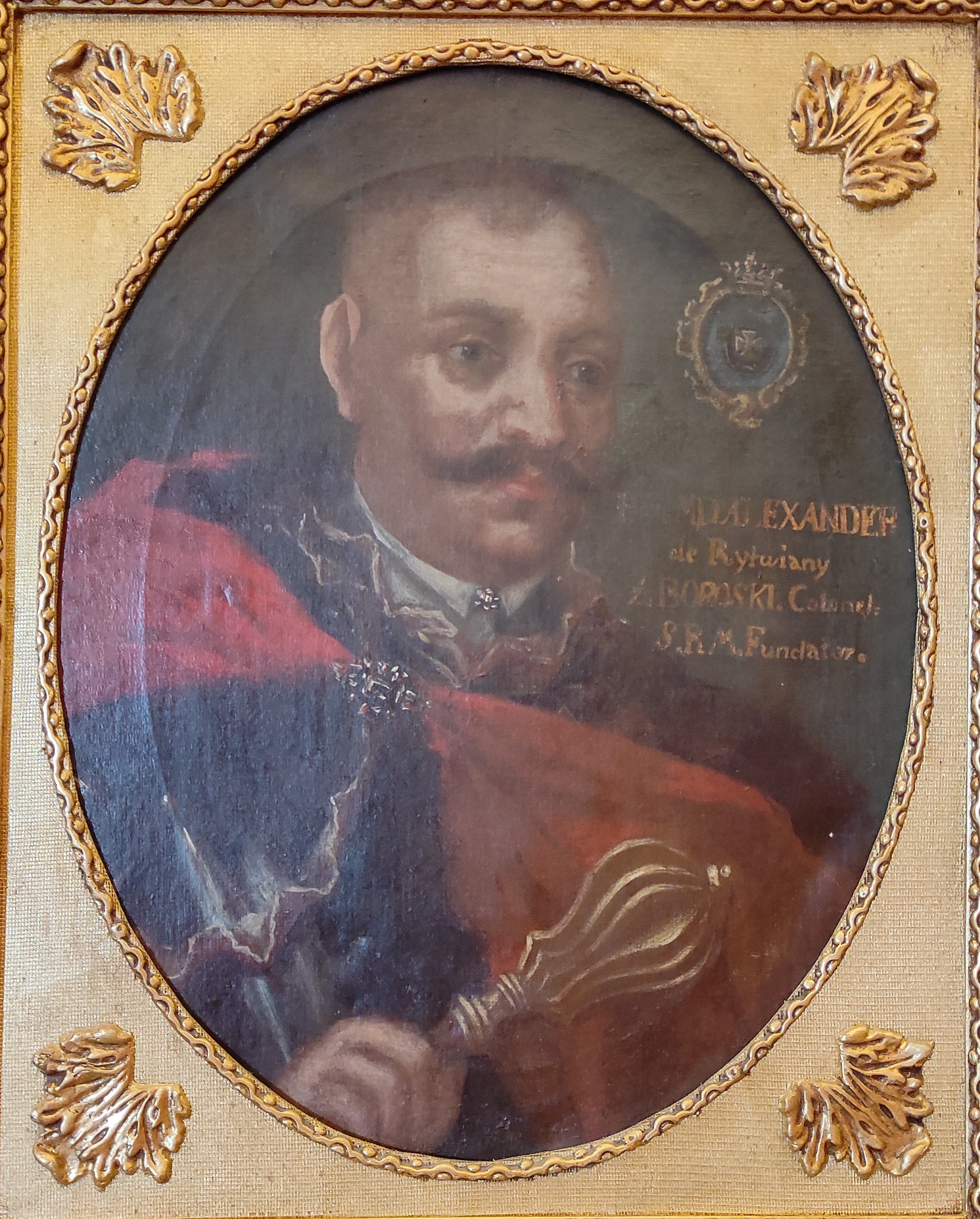
- Spouse: Magdalena Fredro

Aleksander Zborowski (Jastrzebiec coat of arms) was a Polish nobleman (szlachcic) who was the starosta of Miedzyrzecz. He commanded a unit of the Polish army during the Polish–Russian War of 1609–1618. Little is known about his life: he was the son of Samuel Zborowski and Zofia (née Jordan).

== Military service ==
In May 1610, he defeated German mercenaries in Russian service, and during the Battle of Klushino, he commanded his own regiment. In September 1610, Zborowski defeated Russian-German forces near Tver.

== Personal life ==
Zborowski married Magdalena Fredro, and had three children: daughters Anna and Konstancja, and son Adam, who became a Jesuit. He died in 1637.

== Sources ==
- Leszek Podhorodecki, Stanislaw Zolkiewski, Ludowa Spóldzielnia Wydawnicza, 1988, ISBN 83-205-4082-8
