= Landed Army =

Russian cavalry during the early modern period

The Landed Army (Russian: Поместное войско, romanized: Pomestnoe voisko) was the feudal cavalry of the Grand Principality of Moscow and Tsardom of Russia in the 15th to 17th centuries.

== Background ==
In the second half of the 14th century, the druzhina was replaced by feudally organized units headed by boyars or dependent princes, and these units consisted of landed gentry (so called "boyar's children" or "service people") and their armed servants ("military slaves"). In the 15th century, such organization of detachments replaced the city regiments.

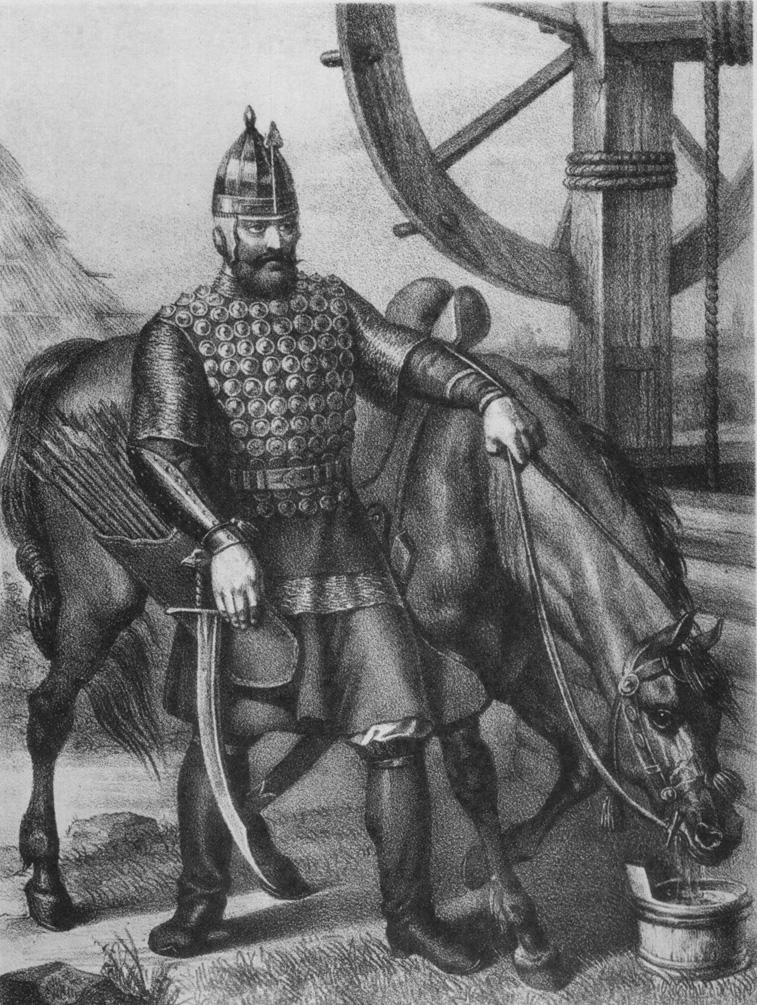
A noble cavalryman.

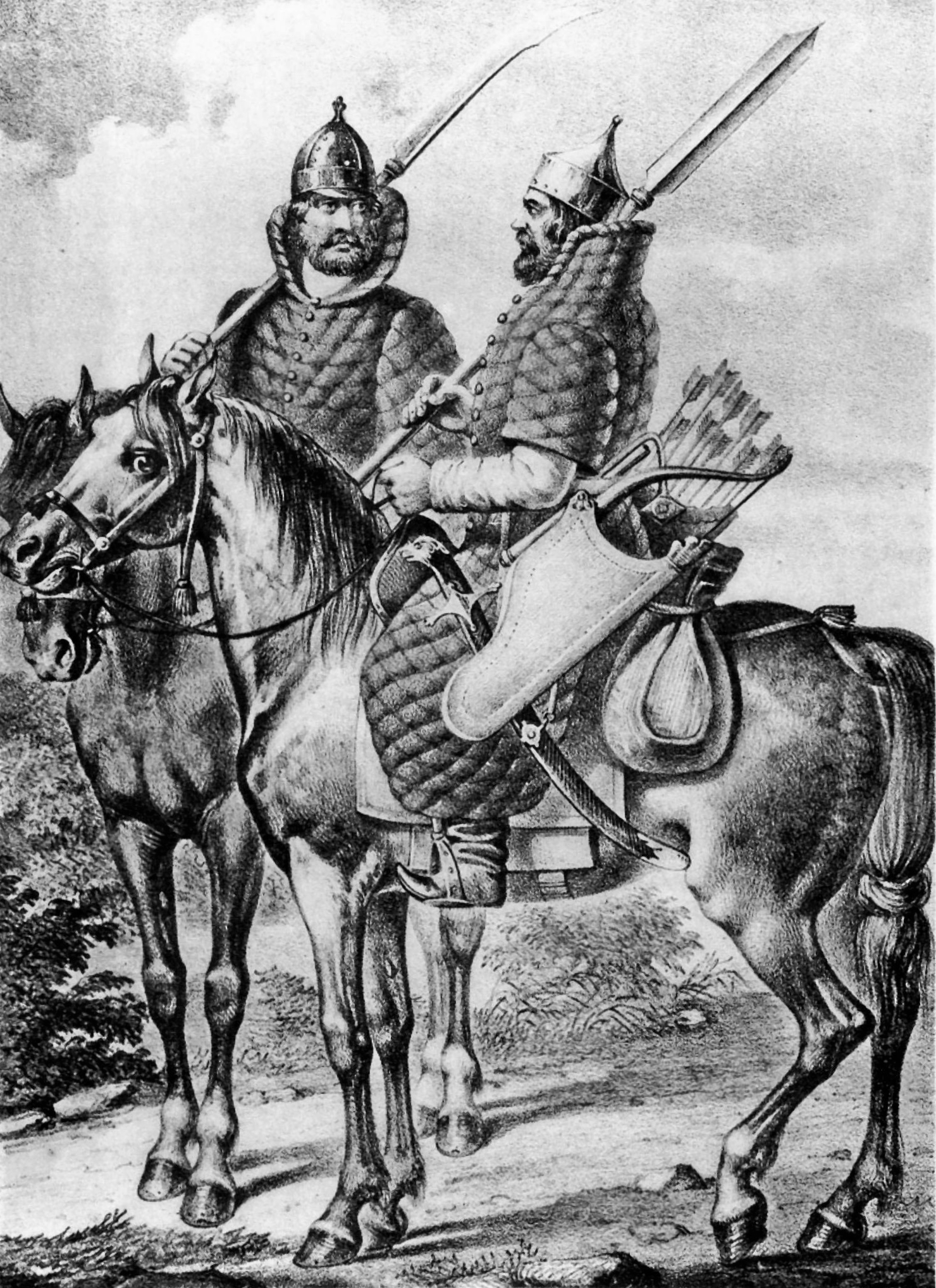
Armed servants.

== Foundation ==
A completely aristocratic army, based on this local system, was formed under Ivan III, the grand prince of Moscow. The process of reforming the army was associated with the unification of the Russian lands. Eventually, the Grand Principality of Moscow included new petty princedoms, courts of independent princes were dismissed, and "service people" passed to the grand prince. As a result, the appanage princes and boyars were transformed into state servants, who received estates for service in conditional holding ("pomestye" – military fief). In 1482, the landed army (Russian: Поместное войско) was formed, the bulk of which were noblemen and "boyar's children" ("hereditary servitors"), accompanied by their armed slaves. They were usually equipped as mounted archers.

== Organization ==
The system of conscription, when a certain number of warriors (with horse and weapon) was provided from a certain area of the land, or a certain number of households, prevailed in the 15th–17th centuries. It was usual to provide one warrior for each 100–200 quarters (0.5 ha) of land, or every 3–30 households.

== Equipment ==
The landlords armed themselves and armed their people at their own expense. The main weapon of this militia cavalry, from the end of the 15th to the beginning of the 17th century, was the composite bow. After the Time of Troubles, firearms became common, including wheellock pistols and arquebuses.

Armour included the brigandine, mail and plate and mirror armour, while poor noblemen and combat slaves only had padded protection.

== Size ==
At the end of the 16th century, the number of noblemen and boyar children did not exceed 25,000, so the Landed army numbered up to 50,000 men, including combat slaves. These forces, however, were dispersed over a large territory, so that only a part could be mobilized for a campaign at any time. About 10,000 militia cavalry took part in the Battle of Moscow in 1612.

== Decline ==
Poor performance and discipline of noble cavalrymen during the Time of Troubles and Smolensk War led to the establishment of professional army units (Reiters, Dragoons, Pikemen and Musketeers) according to Western European military standards. Most of the hereditary servitors were included in the new, professional cavalry units, while the last remnants of militia cavalry were disbanded by Peter the Great.

== See also ==
- Russian rank titles during the sixteenth and seventeenth centuries

== Sources ==
- "Поместные войска" . Brockhaus and Efron Encyclopedic Dictionary (in Russian). 1906.
