= Monument to Minin and Pozharsky, Nizhny Novgorod =

Sources added

Monument to Minin and Pozharsky
- Памятник Минину и Пожарскому
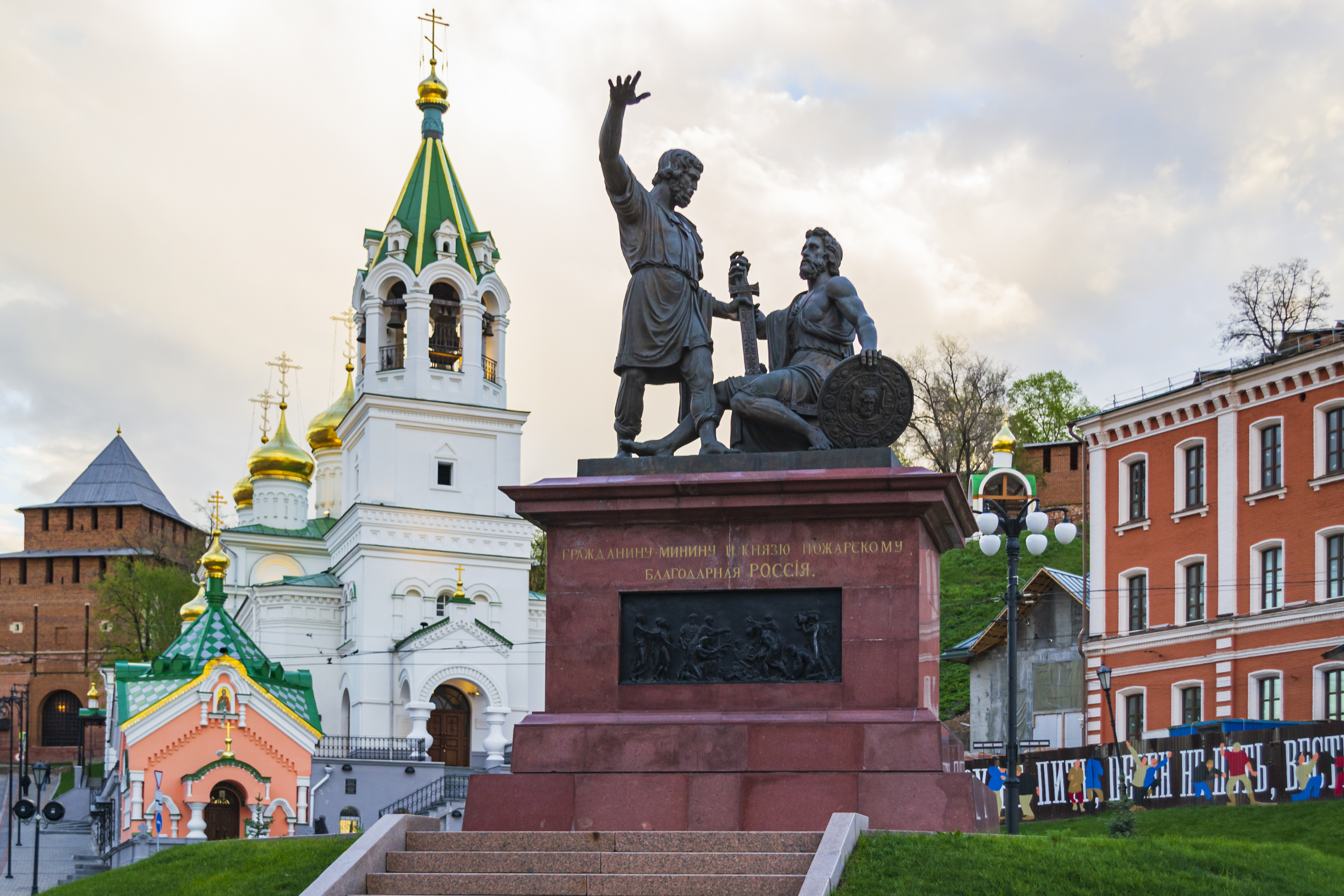
- Monument to Minin and Pozharsky against the backdrop of the Kremlin and the Church of St. John the Baptist
- Location: National Unity Square, Nizhny Novgorod, Russia
- Coordinates: 56.329861°N 43.996920°E
- Designer: Ivan Martos
- Builder: Zurab Tsereteli
- Material: bronze
- Beginning date: 2004
- Completion date: 2005
- Opening date: November 4, 2005

The Monument to Minin and Pozharsky (Russian: Па́мятник Ми́нину и Пожа́рскому) is a copy of the monument erected on Red Square in Moscow. The monument is located in the historic centre of Nizhny Novgorod on National Unity Square, under the walls of the Kremlin, near the Church of St. John the Baptist.

== History of creation ==
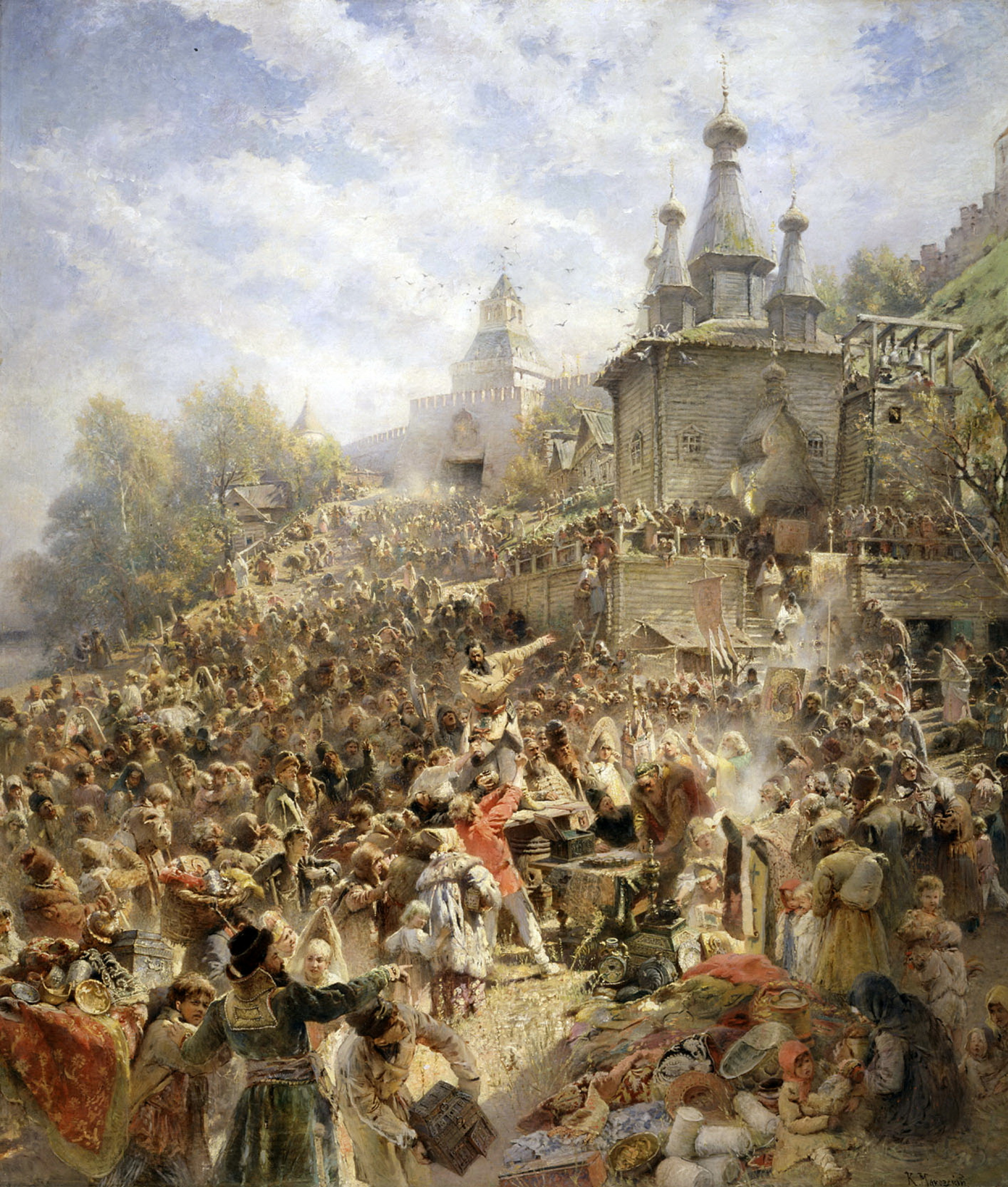
Kuzma Minin on the square of Nizhny Novgorod (the porch of the wooden church of St. John the Baptist), calling on the people to donate. Konstantin Makovsky (1839–1915)

The history of the monument goes back to the Time of Troubles. Russia was under a Polish-Lithuanian siege, and Moscow was occupied by the Poles. Then, in 1611, in Nizhny Novgorod, the zemstvo elder Kuzma Minin began to call on the people to take up arms against the Polish occupiers. He was supported by the city council, governors and the clergy. At the ringing of the bell, the people gathered in the Kremlin, in the Transfiguration Cathedral. After the service, Minin appealed to the people of Nizhny Novgorod with a call to stand up for the liberation of the Russian Tsardom from foreign enemies. Then it was decided to raise funds for the people's militia.

It was also necessary to find a commander for the future militia. Nizhny Novgorod decided to ask Prince Dmitry Pozharsky to head it. The noble prince did not immediately agree and set the condition that Minin was in charge of economic affairs in the militia.

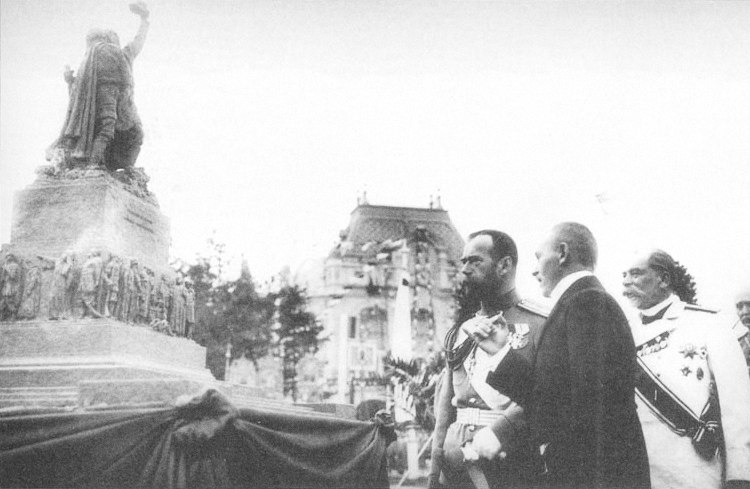
Emperor of All Russias Nicholas II on the Annunciation Square near the model of the monument to Minin and Pozharsky

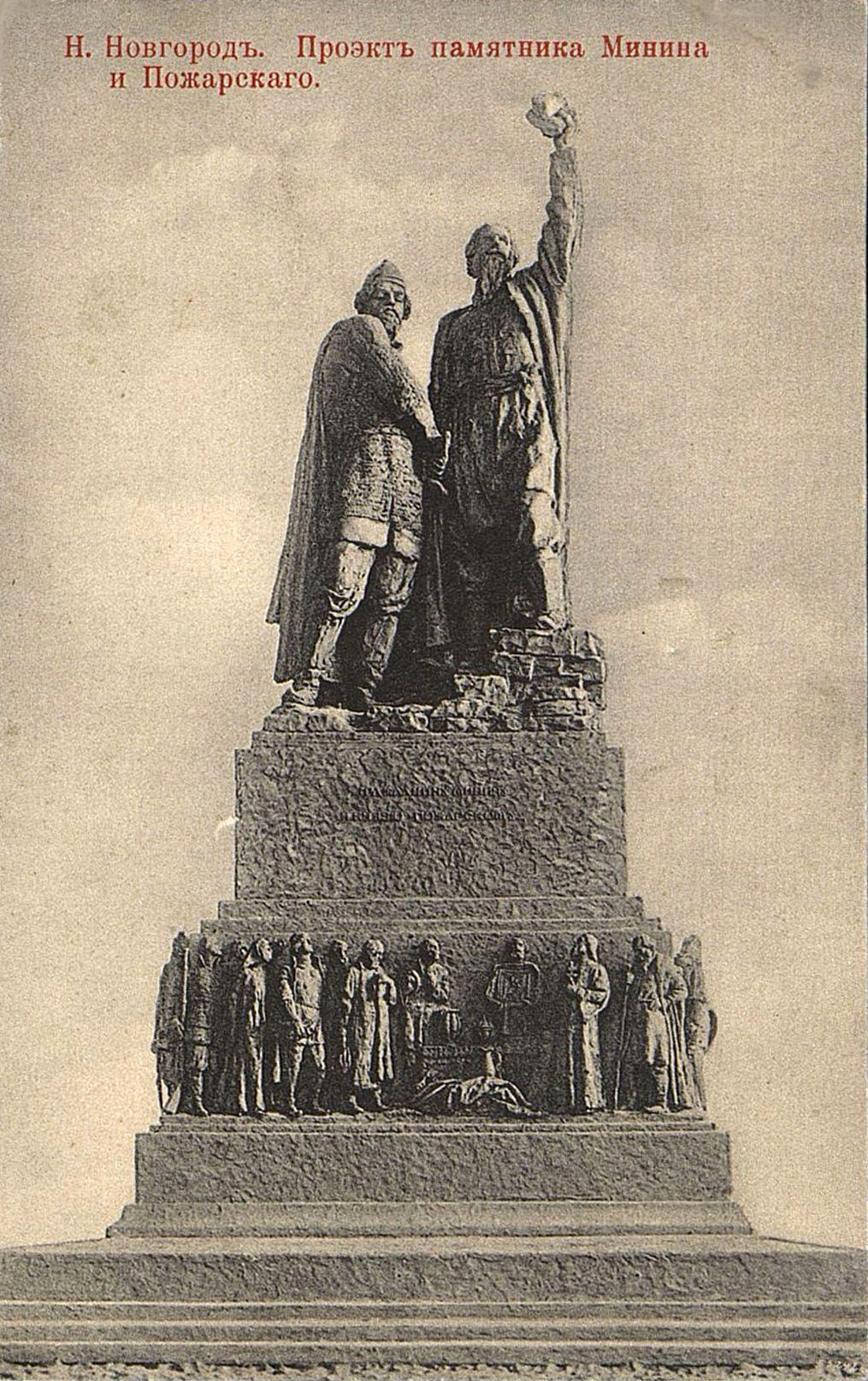
Unrealized project of the monument. Postcard 1910–1914

In 1803, it was decided to start raising funds for the erection of a monument in honor of Minin and Pozharsky. Ivan Martos immediately got down to business. Initially, it was supposed to erect a monument in Nizhny Novgorod, but due to the fact that it was of great value to the country, it was decided to install it on Red Square in Moscow. 4 March [O.S. 20 February] 1818 the unveiling ceremony took place. In Nizhny Novgorod, on the territory of the Kremlin, in 1828, an obelisk was erected in honor of Minin and Pozharsky instead of the monument. In the 1910s, it was planned to erect a new monument to Minin and Pozharsky in the city, but due to the beginning of the revolutionary events, they did not manage to complete it, and from the material prepared for the memorial, the Bolsheviks made a monument to the Victims of the Revolution of 1905, which was installed on Freedom Square (Russian: Площадь Свободы, romanized: Ploshchad' Svobody).

In 2004, Moscow Mayor Yury Luzhkov decided to install a copy of the Moscow monument in Nizhny Novgorod. He offered to copy the monument to the famous Russian sculptor Zurab Tsereteli. On November 4, 2005, the grand opening of the monument took place on the new square of Nizhny Novgorod - the National Unity Square. The choice of the place was not accidental - after all, it was from here that the people's militia of 1611 began.

On this day, a new holiday appeared in Russia - the day of unity. The date also turned out to be not accidental, because on October 22 (November 4), 1612, Moscow was liberated from the Poles, and in 1649 Tsar Alexis ordered to celebrate the day of the Our Lady of Kazan, which is now also celebrated on November 4.

== Differences of monuments ==
- The monument, which stands in Nizhny Novgorod, is 5 cm smaller than the original.
- The inscriptions on the pedestals differ:
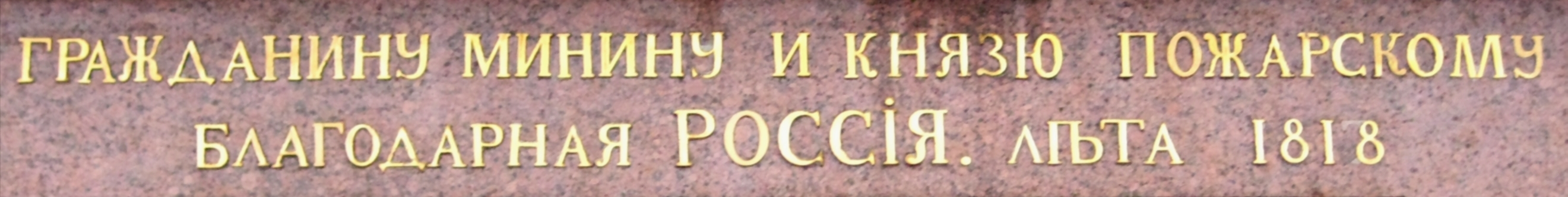
In Moscow

To Citizen Minin and Prince Pozharsky Grateful Russia. Summer of 1818
Russian: Гражданину Минину и Князю Пожарскому Благодарная Россія. Лѣта 1818 года

Russian: Гражданину Минину и Князю Пожарскому Благодарная Россия. Лета 1818 года
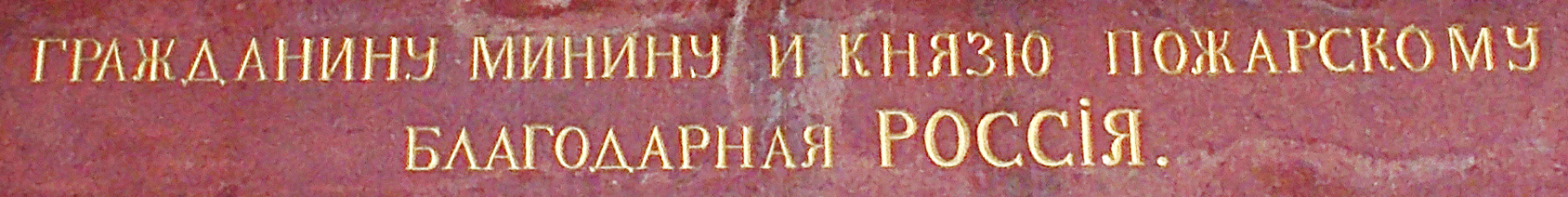
In Nizhny Novgorod

To Citizen Minin and Prince Pozharsky Grateful Russia
Russian: Гражданину Минину и Князю Пожарскому Благодарная Россія

Russian: Гражданину Минину и Князю Пожарскому Благодарная Россия

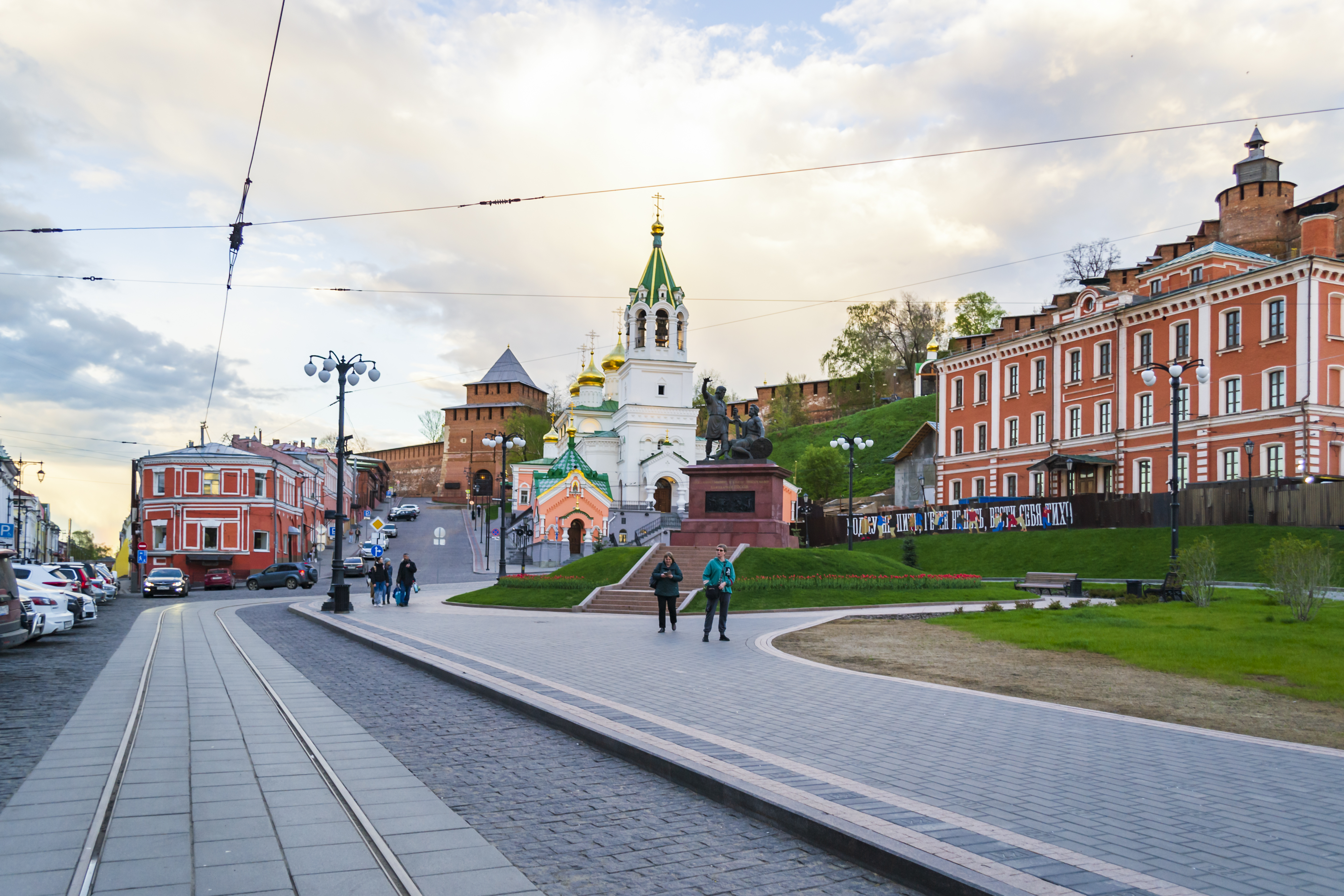
National Unity square

== See also ==
- Monument to Minin and Pozharsky
- Rozhdestvenskaya Street
- Nizhny Novgorod Kremlin
