= Magzhan Zhumabayev =

Kazakh poet and writer

Mağjan Jūmabaev
- Мағжан Жұмабаев; Магжан Жумабаев
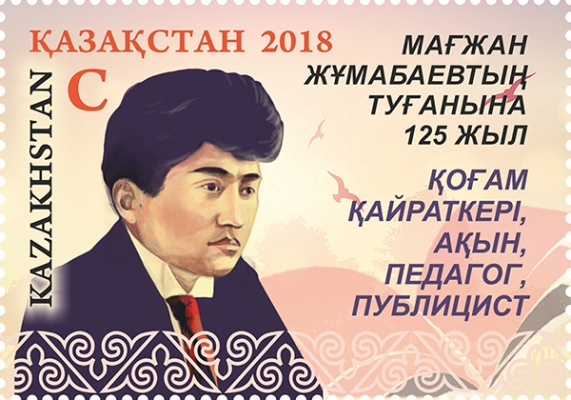
- Jūmabaev on a 2018 Kazakh stamp
- Born: 25 June 1893; Akmolinsk Oblast, Russian Empire
- Died: 19 March 1938 (aged 44); Almaty, Kazakh SSR, Soviet Union

Mağjan Jūmabaev (Note: Often transliterated as Magzhan Zhumabayev through a Russified Romanization of Магжан Жумабаев.) (Kazakh: Мағжан Жұмабаев; 25 June 1893 – 19 March 1938) was a Kazakh poet and writer who revolutionized the Kazakh language.

== Biography ==
He was born in 1893 into a Kazakh Muslim family in modern-day Astana and was given the name Muhammedjan Jumabayev at birth. For much of his childhood, Muhammedjan was exposed to Islamic poetry as his family was deeply religious. In his teenage years, he shortened his name from "Muhammedjan" to "Magjan". From 1905 until 1910, Muhammedjan (or Magjan hereafter) Jumabayev studied in a madrasah in the town of Petropavl, where he learned the Arabic, Turkish, and Persian languages. In 1911, He moved away from his home town and attended a madrasah in the city of Ufa, where he learned under the Volga Tatar classical writer Ğalimcan İbrahimof. In 1912 he began writing Kazakh poetry with the pen name "Şolpan". His poetry was written in the Kazakh language, which used the Arabic alphabet at the time. Within just a year, Magjan's works became highly popular among Kazakh intellectuals.

During the summer and winter of 1917, he began taking part in the creation of Kazakh "Alash" party and Alaş Orda, a coalition of Kazakh nationalists who wanted a new national government that promoted Islam and was independent from their Russian overlords. Magjan was present at both All-Kazakh congresses as a delegate of Akmolinsk Oblast.

Magjan moved back and forth between Petropavl and Ufa before finally settling in the Russian capital of Moscow. While living there, he translated the works of Lermontov, Koltsov, Balmont, Merezhkovsky, Ivanov, Mamin-Sibiriak, Maksim Gorky, Alexander Blok, Goethe, Heine and other poets into Arabic, Kazakh, Turkish, and Persian. After finishing his higher education in 1927, he returned to his hometown in Kazakhstan to work as teacher.

=== Arrest ===
Because of the unfair accusation of being a Pan-Turkist member of Alaş Orda and a Japanese spy, Jumabayev was arrested in Petropavl and convicted for the 10-year deprivation of liberty. Until his court date he had been staying in Butyrka prison, and later was sent to Karelia and Arkhangelsk Oblast. In 1934, Maksim Gorky and Peshkova received a letter from him and due to their intervention Magjan Jumabayev was emancipated before the appointed time. However, just half a year later he was arrested in Almaty again and executed by shooting of NKVD on 19 March 1938.

== Legacy ==
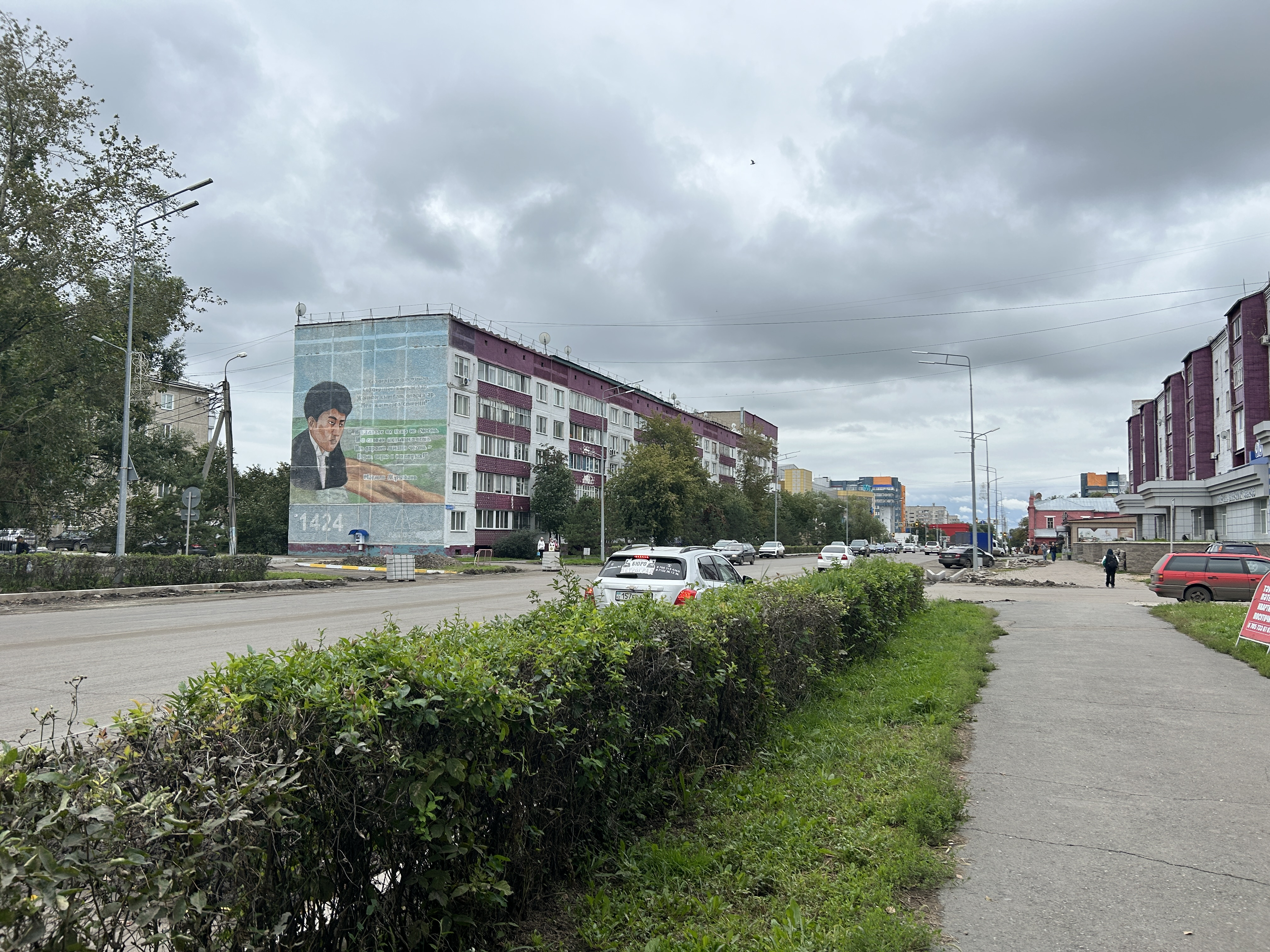
Jūmabaev Street, Petropavl, September 2024

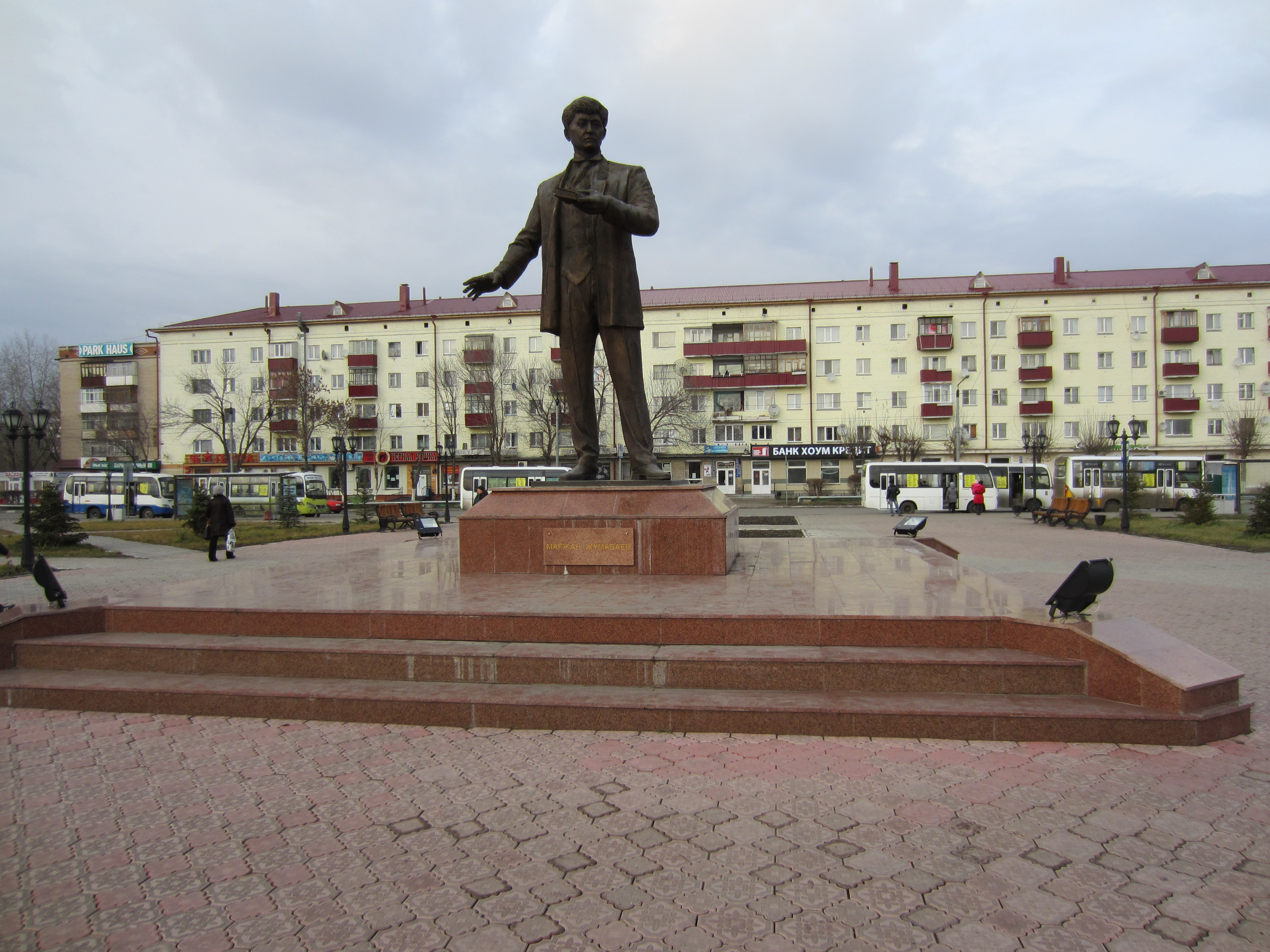
Statue of Jūmabaev, Petropavl

Streets in Astana, Almaty, Kokshetau and Petropavlovsk are named after the poet. Magzhan Zhumabayev District was also named after him.

On 28 May 2013, the National Bank of Kazakhstan issued a commemorative coin in honor of the 120th anniversary of Jūmabaev.

On 21 February 2018, a monument to Jūmabaev was unveiled in Ankara.

On 24 June 2018, a monument was unveiled in Petropavlovsk in honor of the 125th anniversary of Jūmabaev. The author is the Kazakh sculptor Edige Rakhmadiev.

On 25 June 2018, Kazpost issued commemorative postage stamps for the 125th anniversary of the poet.

== Films ==
- 1990 — Mağjan (Documentary) ("Kazakhtelefilm").
