= Stepan Stoichev =

Victor Stoichev
- Victor Stoichev
- Born: 17 May 1891; Kishinev, Russian Empire
- Died: 15 January 1944 (aged 52); Voronezh, USSR

Academic background
- Education: Moscow State University

Academic work
- Discipline: Philology, Literary criticism

Stepan Antonovich Stoichev (Russian: Степа́н Анто́нович Сто́йчев, Russian pronunciation: [sʲtʲɪˈpan ɐnˈtonəvʲɪtɕ ˈstojtɕɪf]; 17 May 1891 – 15 January 1944) was a Soviet philologist, specialist in literary criticism, Head of Nizhniy Novgorod Pedagogical Institute (now Kozma Minin Nizhny Novgorod State Pedagogical University), Head of N. I. Lobachevsky State University of Nizhny Novgorod, Head of Perm University, and Head of Voronezh Pedagogical Institute (now Voronezh State Pedagogical University).

== Sources ==
- Article about Stepan Stoichev by Kartseva N.P.: Карцева Н. П. Штрихи к портрету ректора // Материалы конференции «Пермская элита: история, развитие, современное состояние» (январь–февраль 2003 г.)]
- Kostitsin V.I. Stoichev Stepan Antonovich // Heads of Perm State University. 1916-2006 (Russian)
