= Peskov =

Peskov or Pyeskov (Russian: Песков; feminine: Peskova) is a Russian surname. It is derived from песок, meaning 'sand'. Notable people with the surname include:

- Dmitry Peskov (born 1967), Russian diplomat
- Mikhail Peskov (1834–1864), Russian history and genre painter and lithographer
- Nikolay Peskov (born 1990), Russian army veteran
- Vasily Peskov (1930–2013), Russian writer, journalist, photographer, traveller and ecologist
- Vitaly Peskov (1944–2002), Russian cartoonist and illustrator
- Yevhen Pyeskov (born 1981), Ukrainian footballer

== See also ==
- Peshkov
