= Church of St. John the Baptist (Nizhny Novgorod) =

Church in Russia

- Церковь Рождества Иоанна Предтечи на Торгу
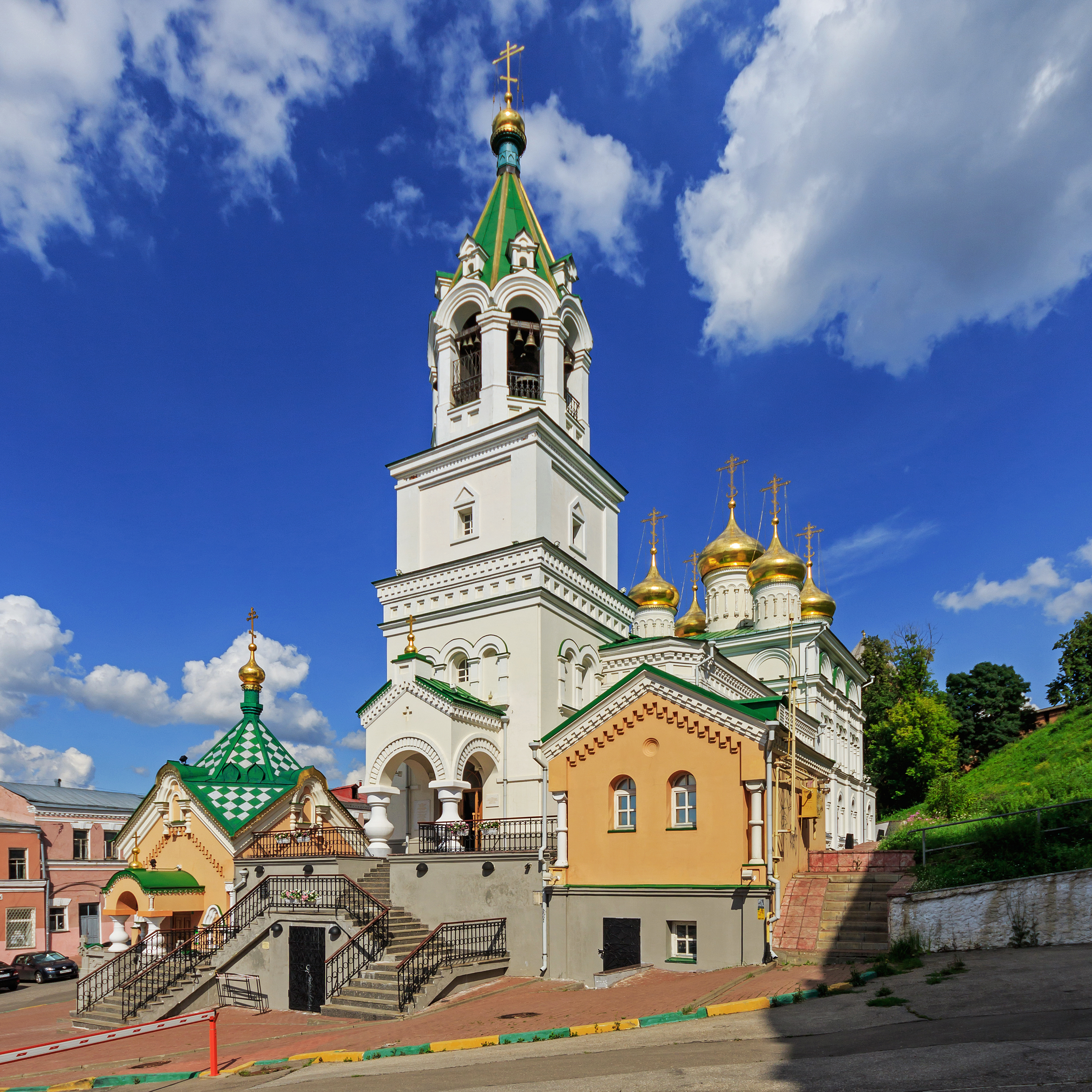

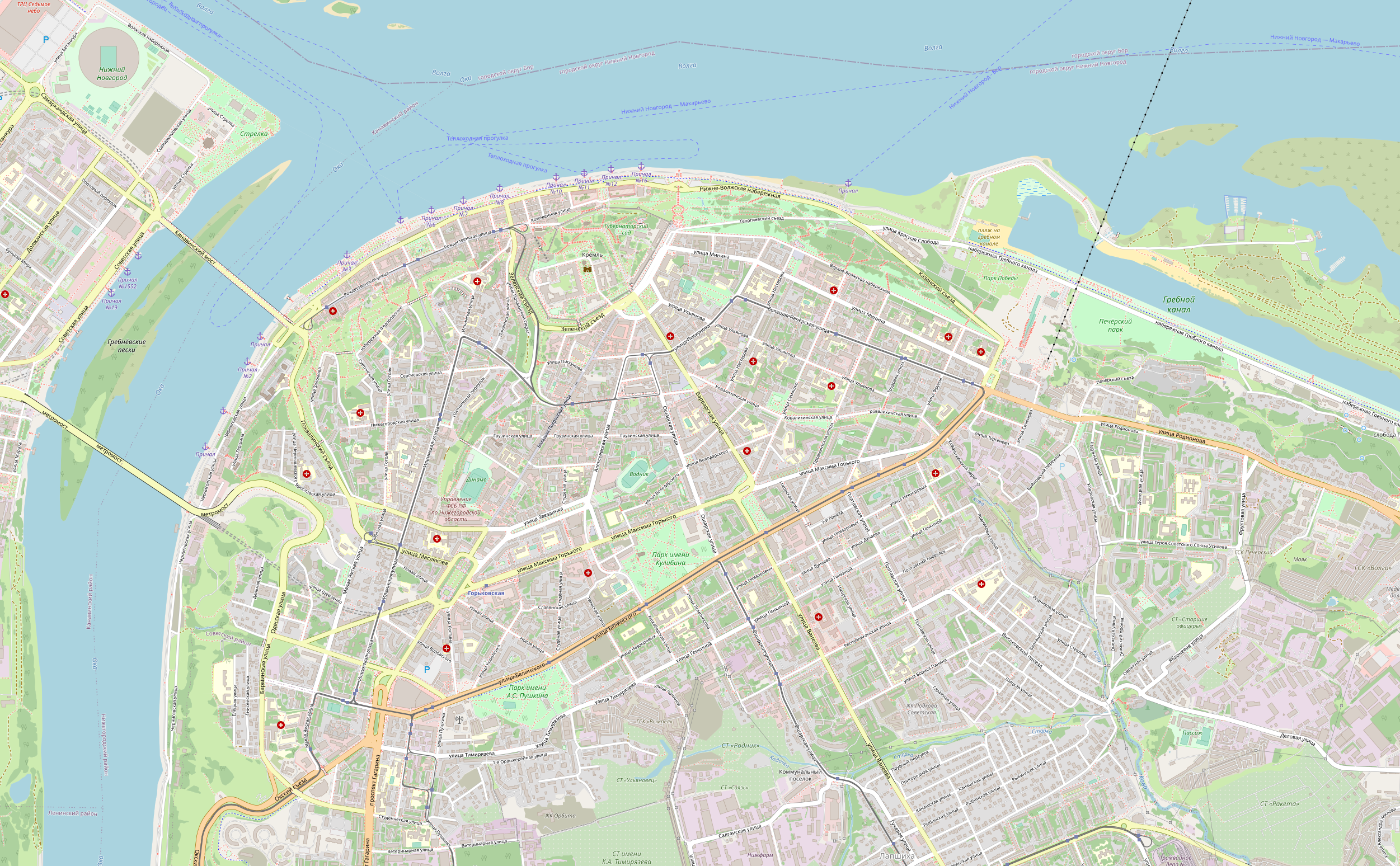
- Location within Nizhny Novgorod

Religion
- Affiliation: Russian Orthodox Church

Location
- Location: Nizhny Novgorod, Russia
- Coordinates: 56°19′47.09″N 43°59′53.12″E

The Church of St. John the Baptist is one of the oldest Orthodox churches in Nizhny Novgorod, mentioned from the 15th century. The stone church was consecrated in 1683, again on November 4, 2005. The nearest Ivanovskaya tower of the Kremlin was named after this temple. The church is located on the National Unity Square, Rozhdestvenskaya Street.

In the Time of Troubles (in 1612), Kuzma Minin appealed to the citizens of Nizhny Novgorod to liberate Moscow from the Polish intervention from the church porch. At that time, the church was still wooden.

== History ==
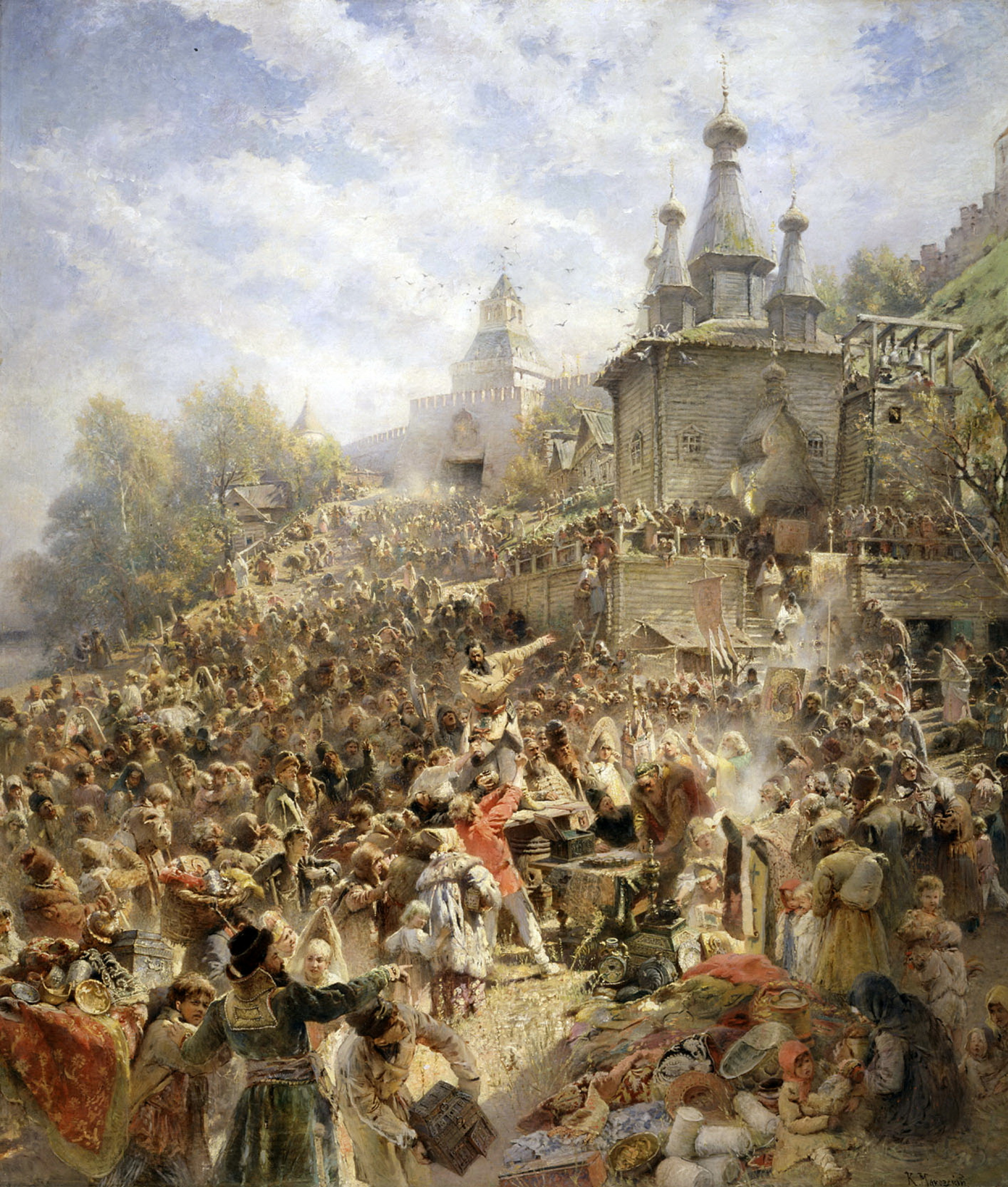
“The Appeal of Minin”, a picture of Konstantin Makovsky.

The wooden church of the Nativity of John the Baptist in Lower Posad is known from the 15th century.

In 1676, the merchant Gavriil (Gabriel) Stepanovich Dranishnikov, who returned from Astrakhan after many years of service, asked Metropolitan Philaret for the construction of a stone temple from his own treasury. The construction of the temple was to confirm Dranishnikov’s commitment to Orthodoxy, since his wife Anna and son became Old Believers and fled to the Kerzhensky monasteries. On August 24, 1679, Gavriil Dranishnikov died, but the temple was completed by his brother Lavrentiy (Lawrence), as Dranishnikov bequeathed, with a southern chapel in honor of the martyress Anna, in memory of his wife, who had gone into schism.

During the town-planning transformations of 1834-1839, it was indicated to clear the land adjacent to the Kremlin from all kinds of buildings, and remove the altar of the Church of St. John the Baptist and all the shops, which disrupted the ancient drainage system, and the underground springs began to gradually erode the foundation. In 1870, the bell tower was rebuilt. In 1881 - 1885, major restoration work was again required. In 1899, after breaking the iron connection inside the temple, the altar was rebuilt.

In 1937 the church was closed, and its last abbot was shot. In the Soviet period, the DOSAAF motorcycle school was located in the church building.

=== Church restoration ===
The temple was returned to the Nizhny Novgorod diocese in the 1990s of the 20th century, and services were resumed since 1994. In June 2004, the decision was made to restore the temple, repair work began. Funds for the restoration were received from the patrons, out of 67 million rubles 60 million were invested by the Balakhna pulp and paper mill. On April 4, 2005, 3 more crosses for installation on the dome were consecrated (2 have already been installed). On August 5, 2005, a dome and a cross were installed on the bell tower. On November 4, 2005, the church was consecrated by Patriarch of Moscow and All Rus' Alexy II. During the restoration of the church, the Christian worship in it did not stop. During the restoration work, a retaining concrete wall was built, and the zero marks were returned to the level of the 19th century.

In 2009, an Orthodox Rood screen hall began to operate in the church.

== Gallery ==
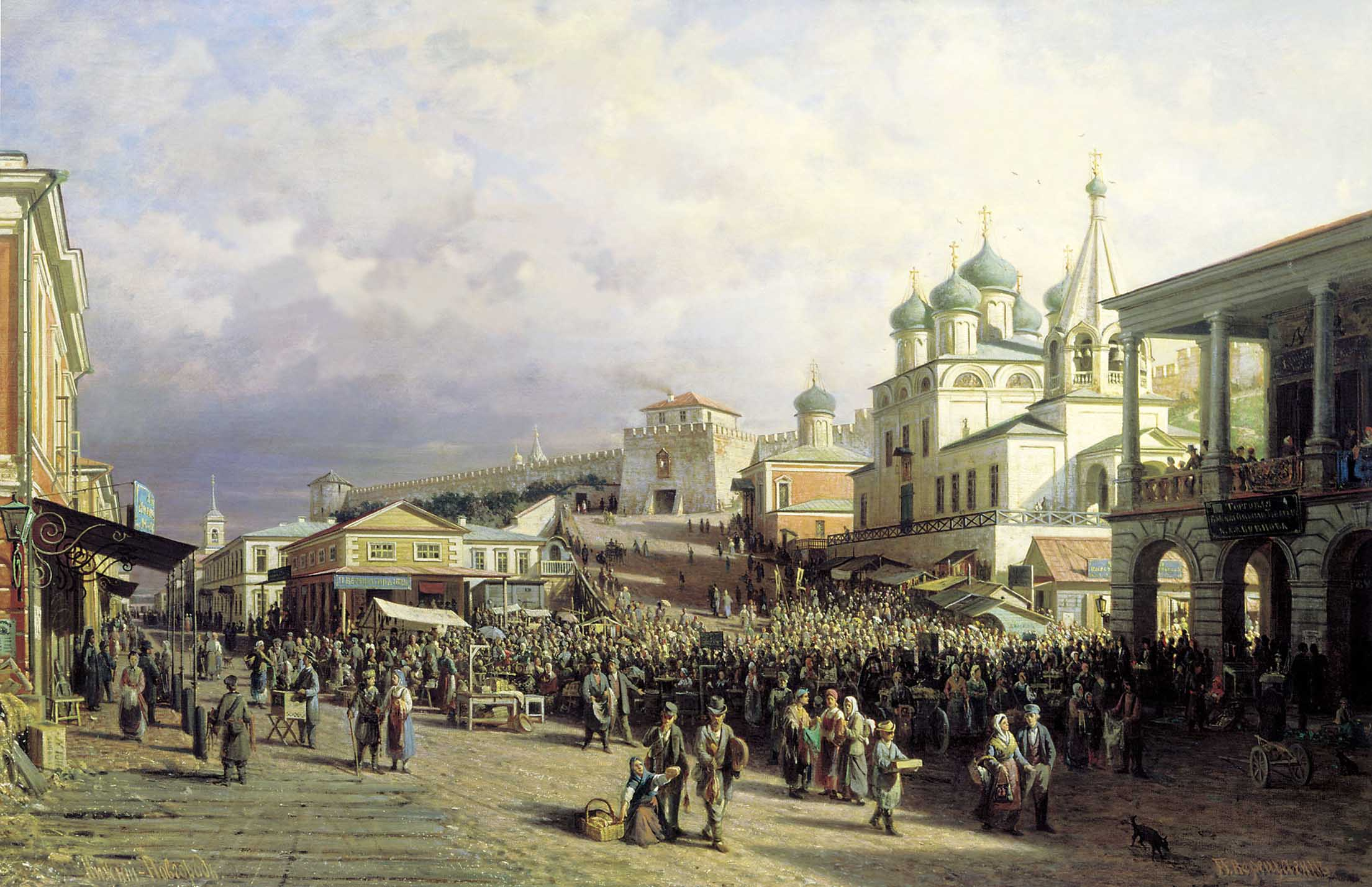
Lower Bazaar in Nizhny Novgorod. Kremlin. Church of St. John the Baptist. 1872

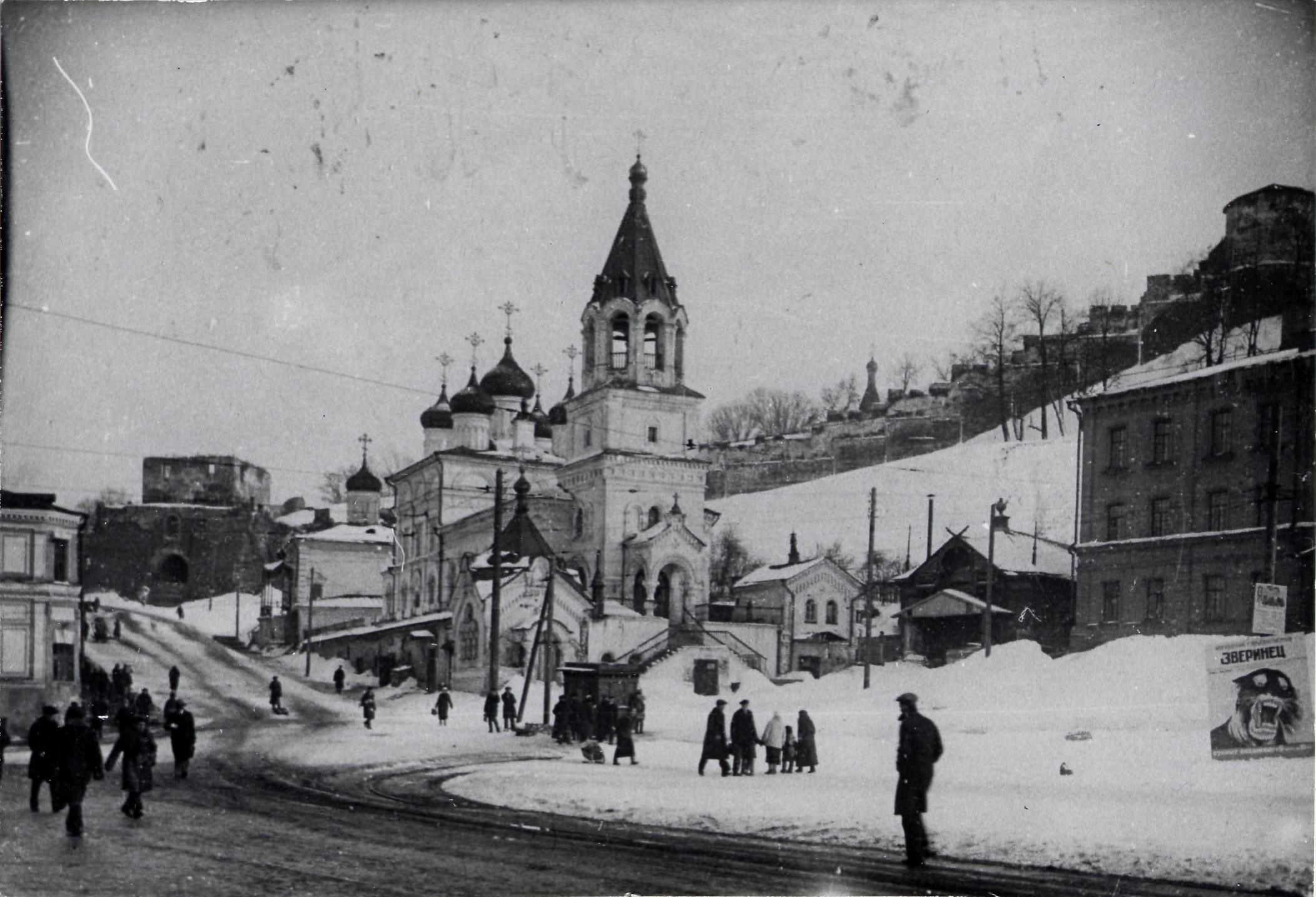
Mid 1930s, photo by Maxim Dmitriev

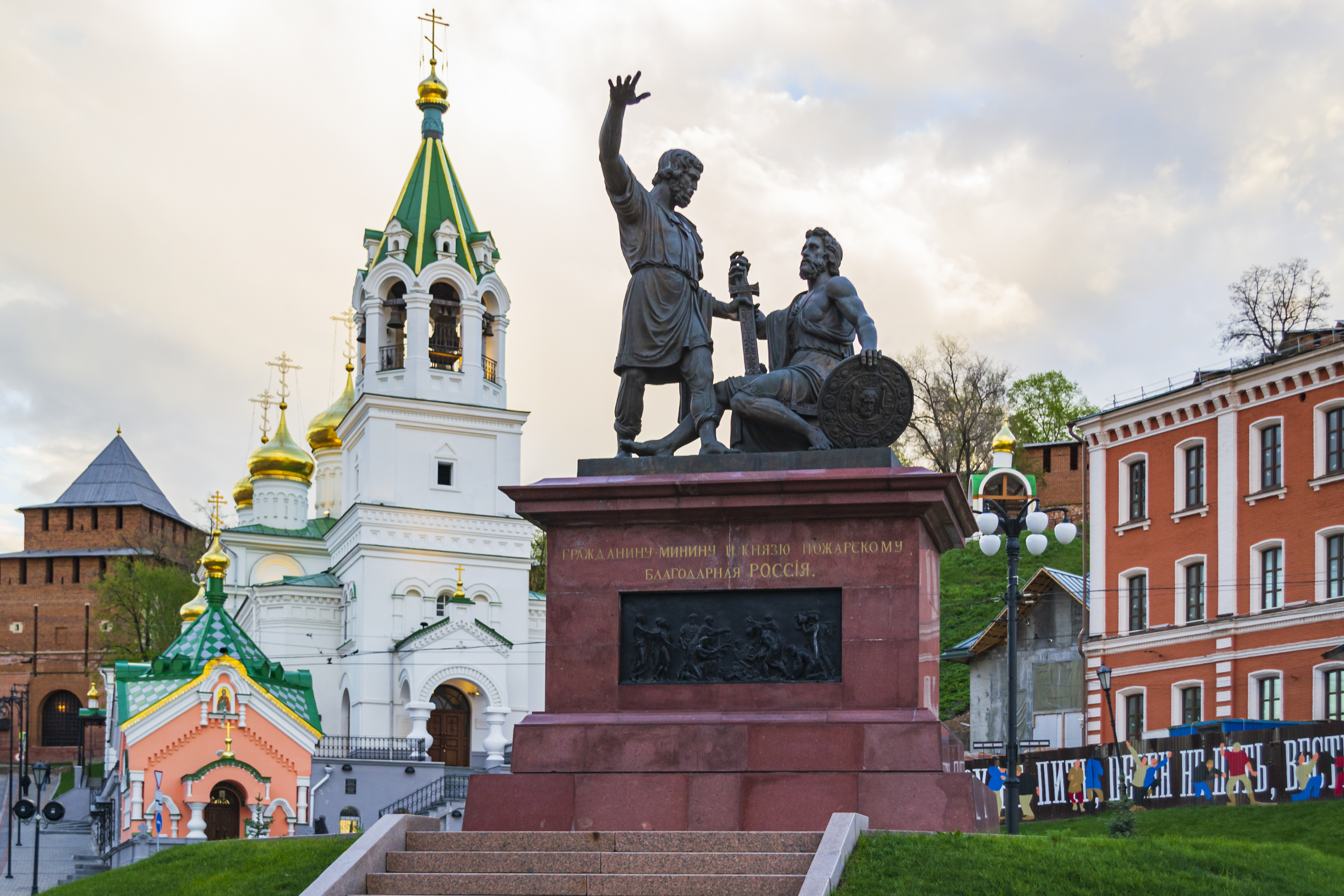
Church of Saint John the Baptist. Monument to Minin and Pozharsky. 2022

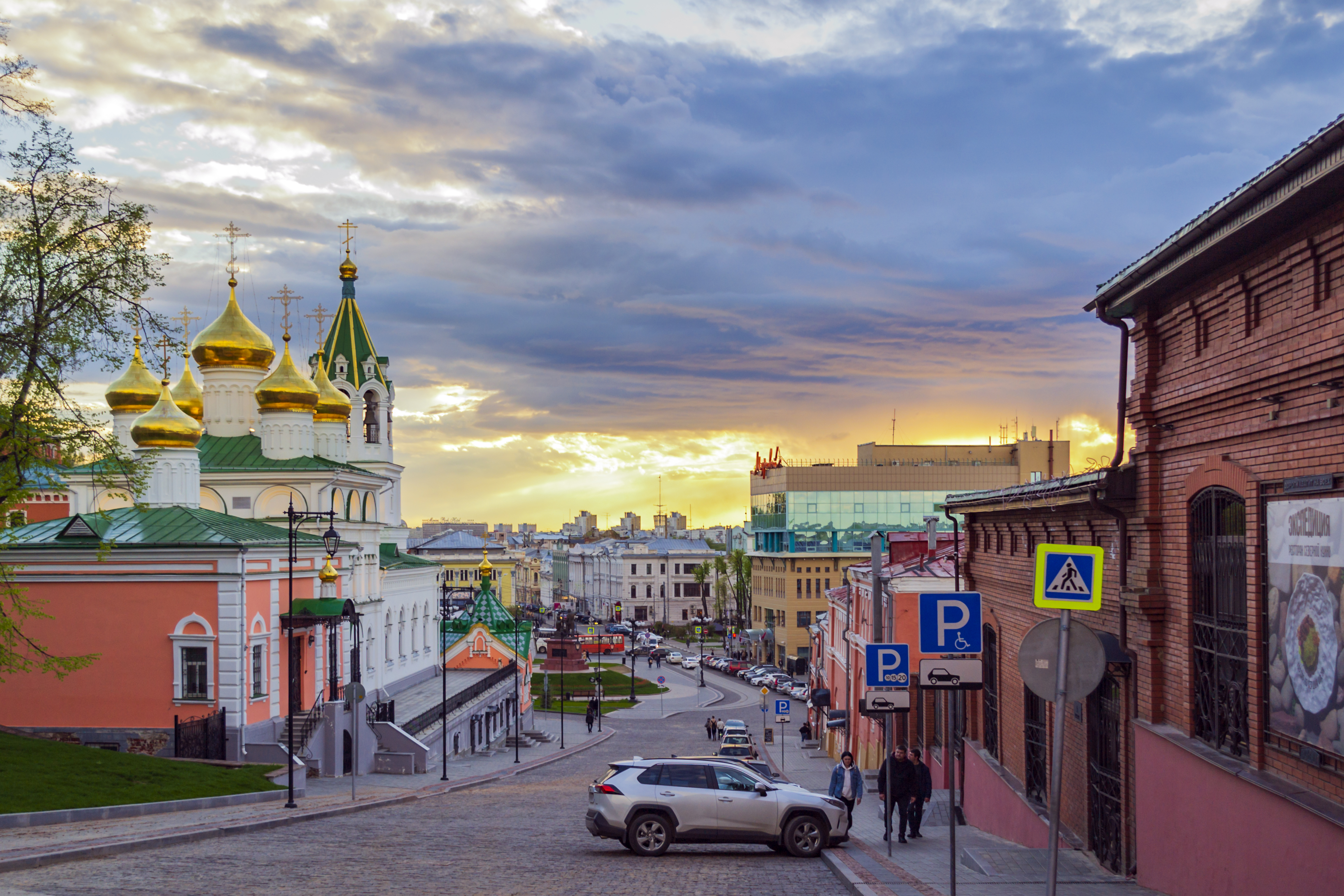
Back view

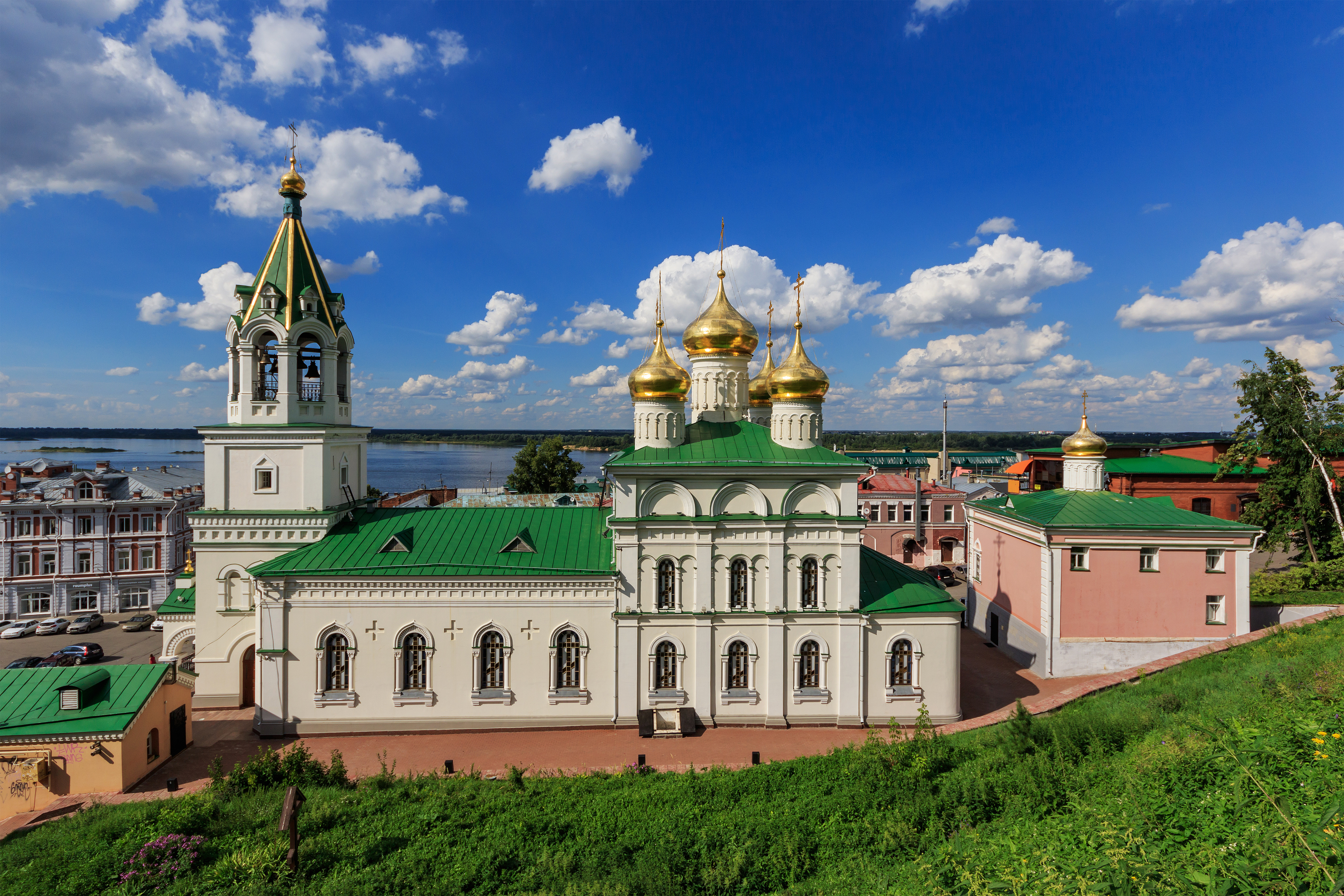
2016

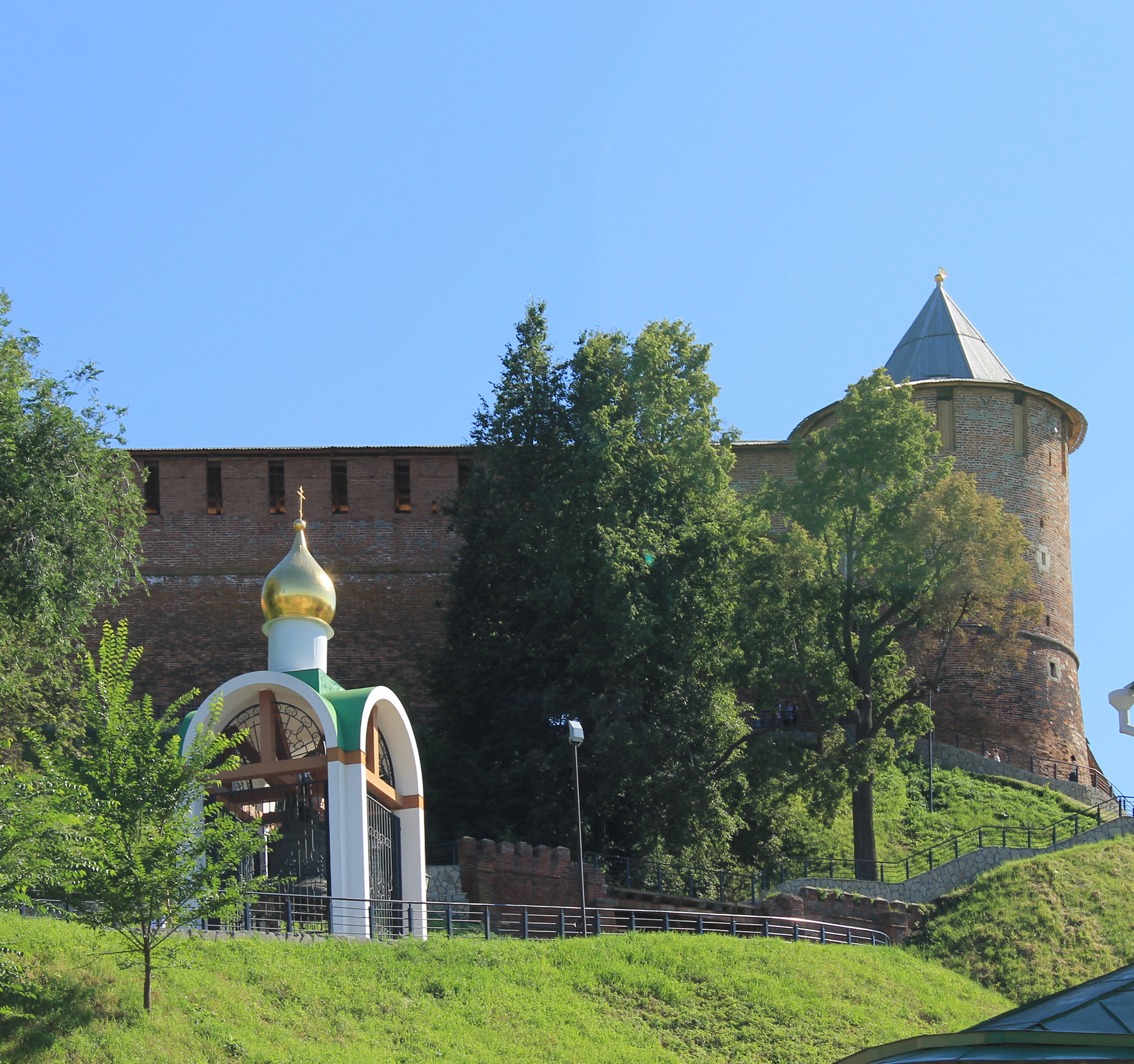
The North Tower

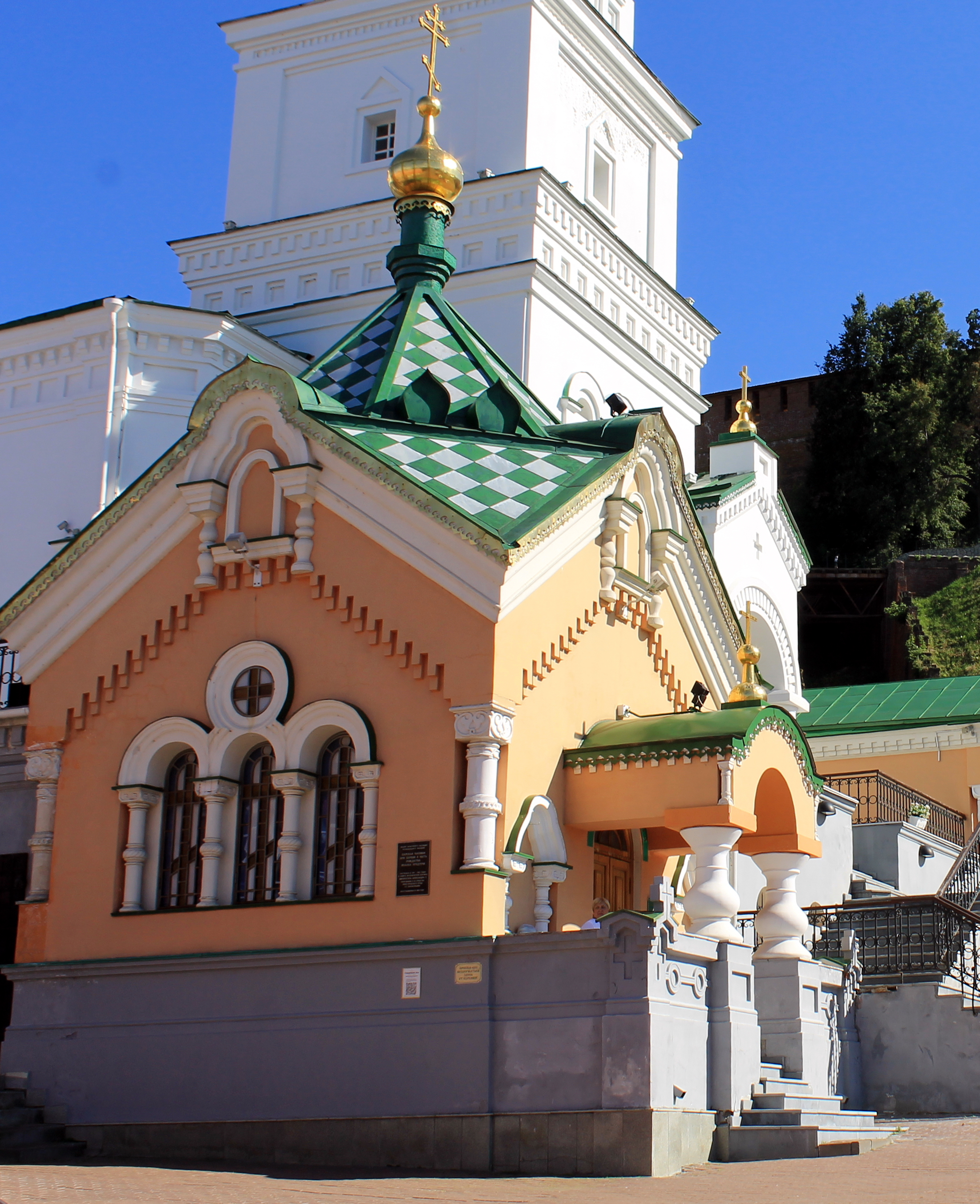
Alexander Nevsky Chapel

== Shrines ==
- Kazan Icon of the Mother of God.
- Icon of St. John the Baptist.

== Links ==
- Official website of the Church of the Nativity of John the Baptist
