= Ivan Martos =

Russian sculptor (1754–1835)

- Иван Мартос
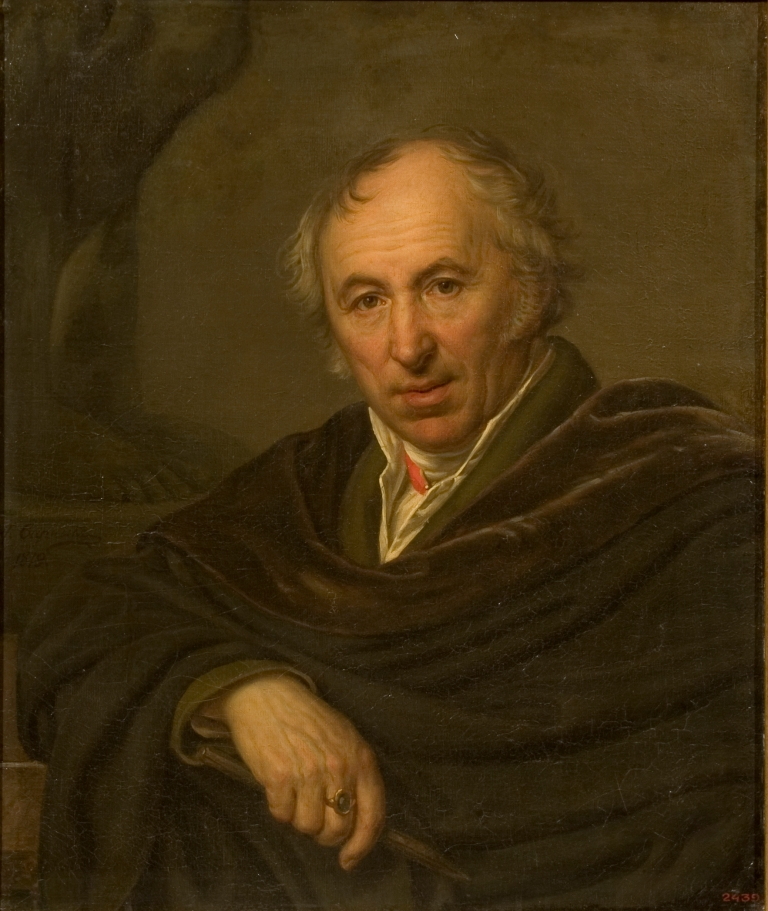
- Portrait by Alexander Varnek, 1819
- Born: 1754; Ichnya, Cossack Hetmanate, Russian Empire
- Died: April 5, 1835 (aged 80–81); Saint Petersburg, Russian Empire
- Resting place: Lazarevskoe Cemetery, Saint Petersburg
- Education: Imperial Academy of Arts (1773)
- Known for: Sculpture
- Notable work: Monument to Minin and Pozharsky, Moscow, 1816–1818
- Elected: Member Academy of Arts (1782); Professor by rank (1783)

Ivan Petrovich Martos (Russian: Ива́н Петро́вич Ма́ртос; Ukrainian: Іва́н Петро́вич Ма́ртос; 1754 – 5 April 1835) was a Russian sculptor and art teacher of Ukrainian origin who helped awaken Russian interest in Neoclassical sculpture.

== Biography ==
Martos was born between Chernigov and Poltava in city of Ichnya and enrolled at the Imperial Academy of Arts between 1764 and 1773. He was then sent to further his education with Pompeo Batoni and Anton Raphael Mengs in Rome. Upon his return to Russia in 1779, Martos started to propagate the ideas of Neoclassicism. He executed a large number of marble tombs, which are often regarded as the finest in the history of Russian art.

Enjoying the patronage of the Russian royalty, Martos held a professorship at the Imperial Academy of Arts since 1779 and became its dean in 1814. His main claim to fame is the Monument to Minin and Pozharsky on Red Square, conceived in 1804 but not inaugurated until 1818. Owing to the many years he spent on this one work, Martos did not produce much other sculpture in the period. He died at St Petersburg.

His later outdoor sculptures - those of Duke de Richelieu above the Potemkin Stairs in Odessa, Prince Potemkin in Kherson, Alexander I in Taganrog, and Mikhail Lomonosov in Kholmogory - became the symbols of those towns, although modern art critics often compare them unfavorably with his earlier, less bombastic works.

During the Soviet dictatorship Martos's memorial statues - including those of Nikita Panin and his family - were snatched from the cemeteries to be exhibited in the newly set up museums, while his colossal bronze statue of Catherine II, unveiled at the top of the Moscow Nobility Column Hall in 1812, was destroyed altogether.

== Selected works ==
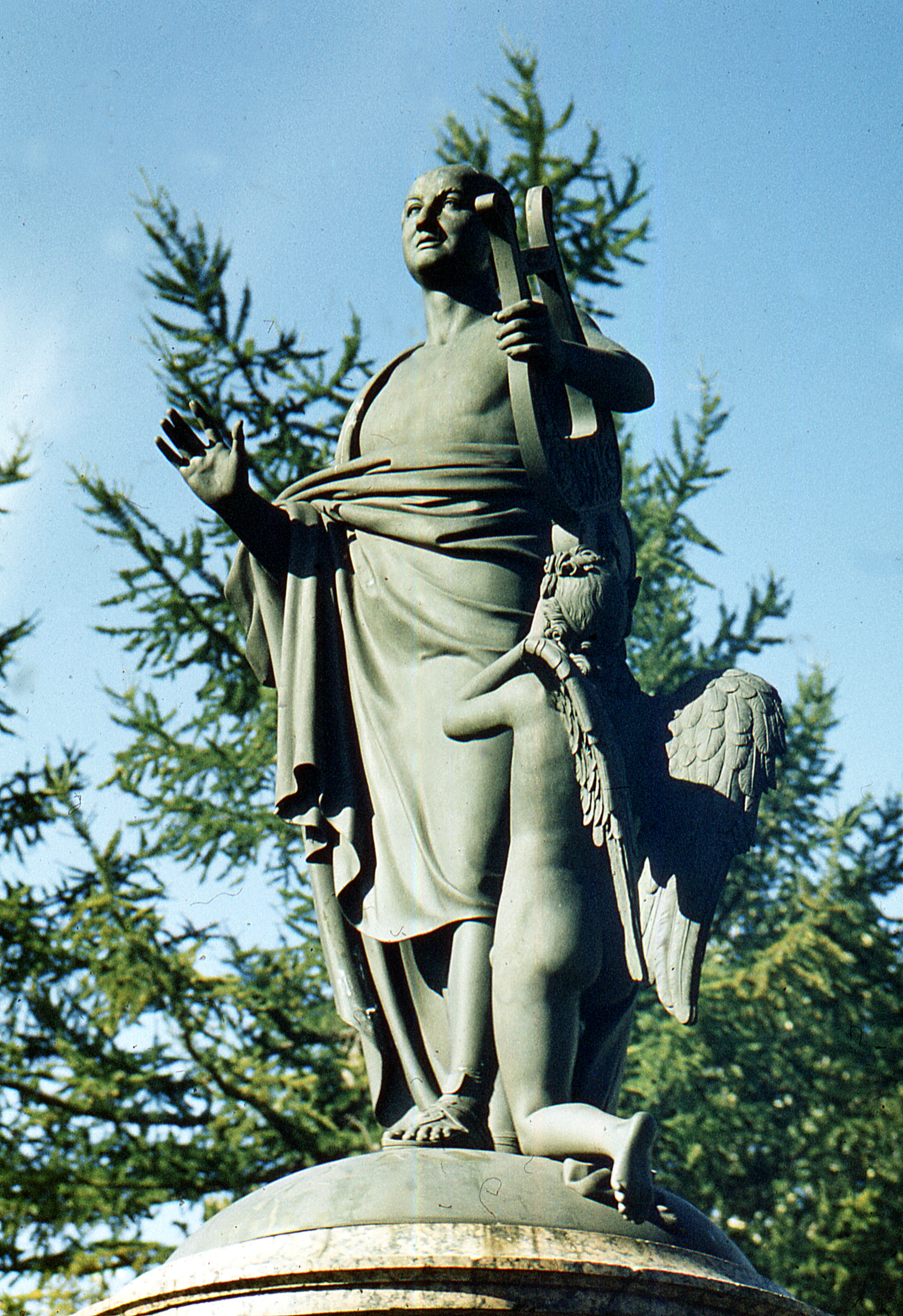
Monument to Mikhail Lomonosov, in Arkhangelsk, Russia

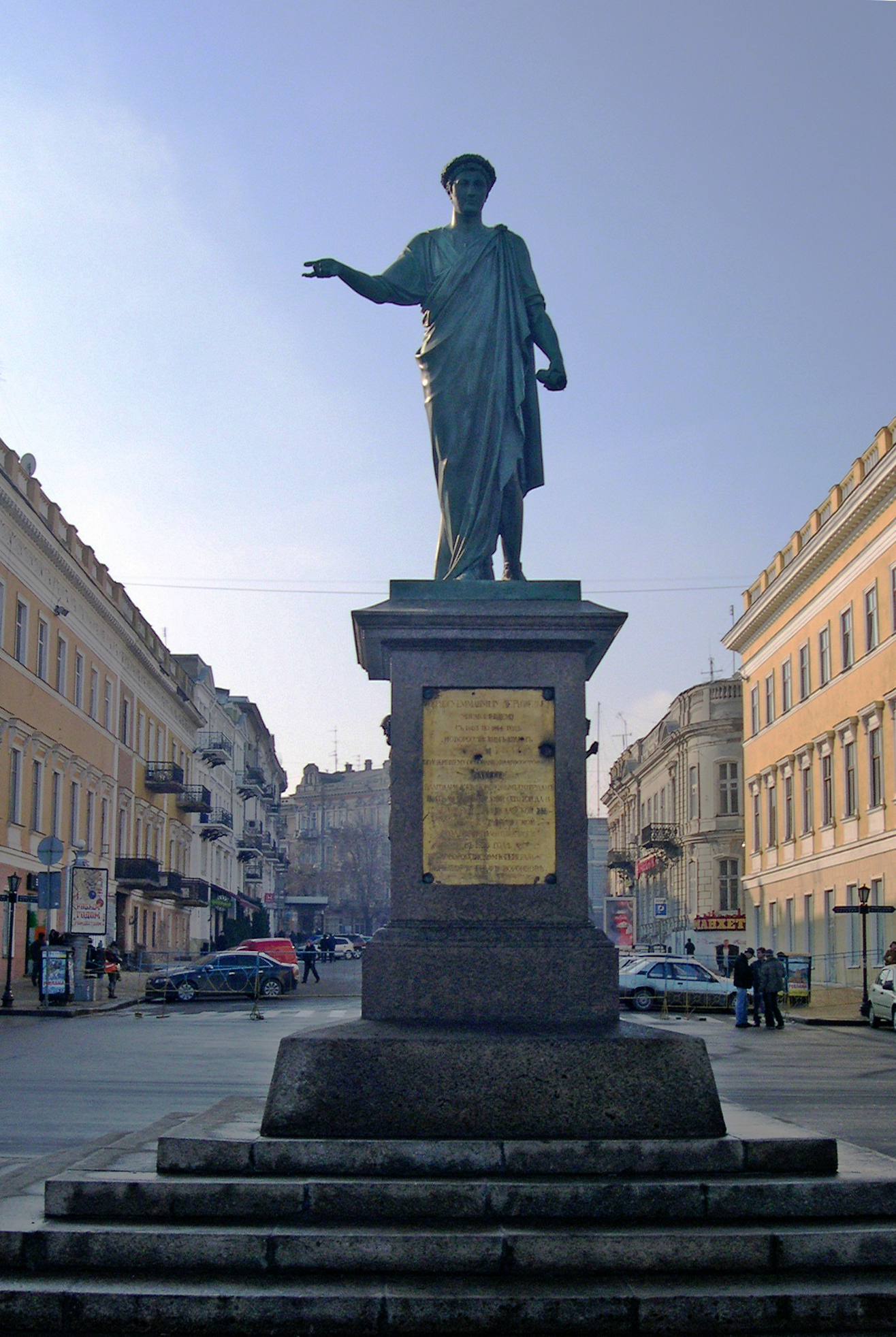
Monument to the Duc de Richelieu, in Odesa, Ukraine

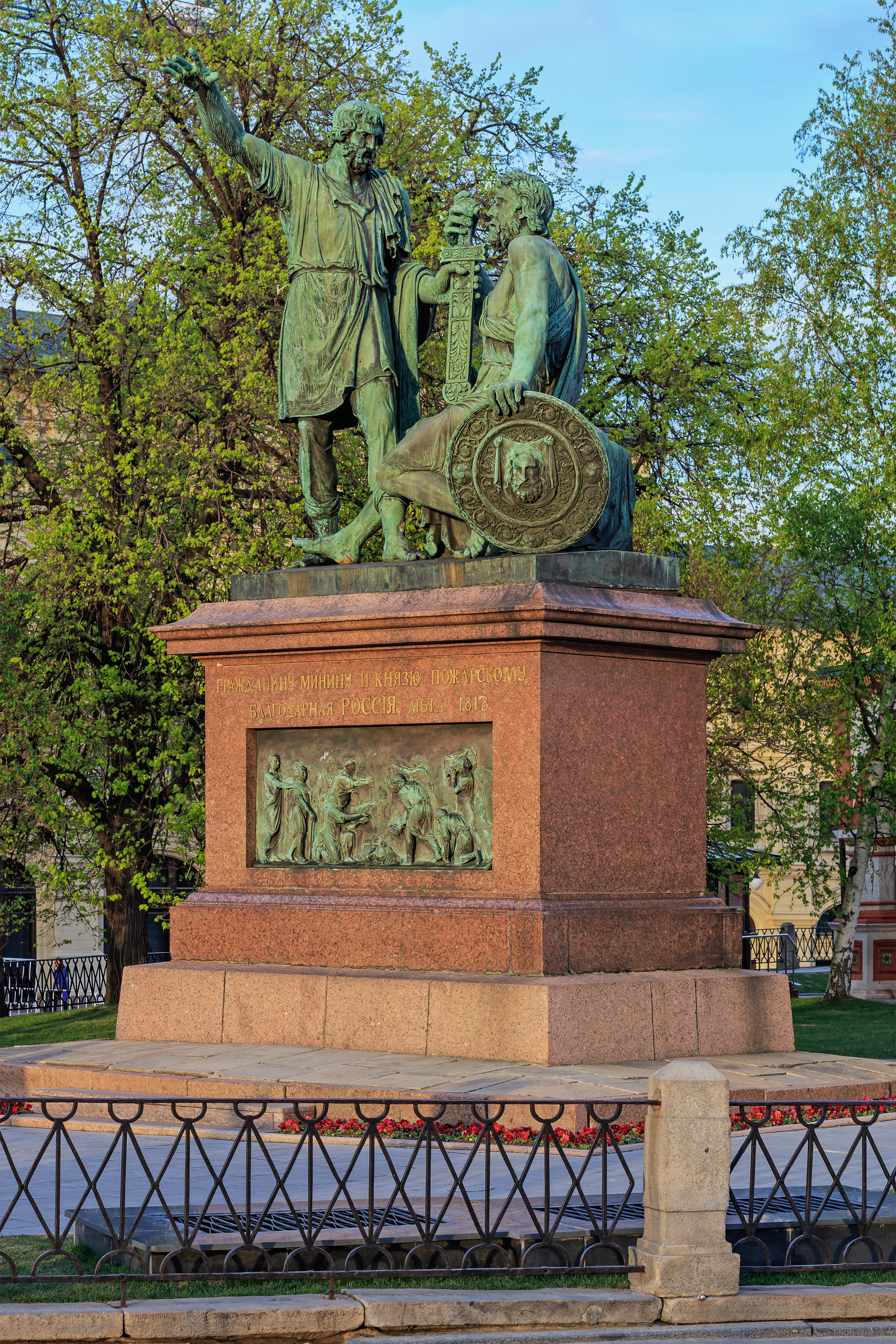
Monument to Kuzma Minin and Dmitri Pozharsky, in Moscow, Russia

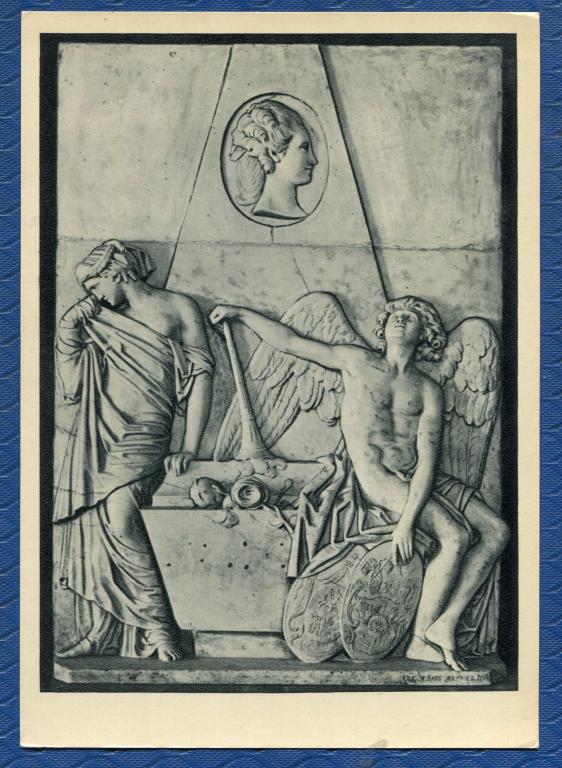
Headstone for
M. P. Sobakin

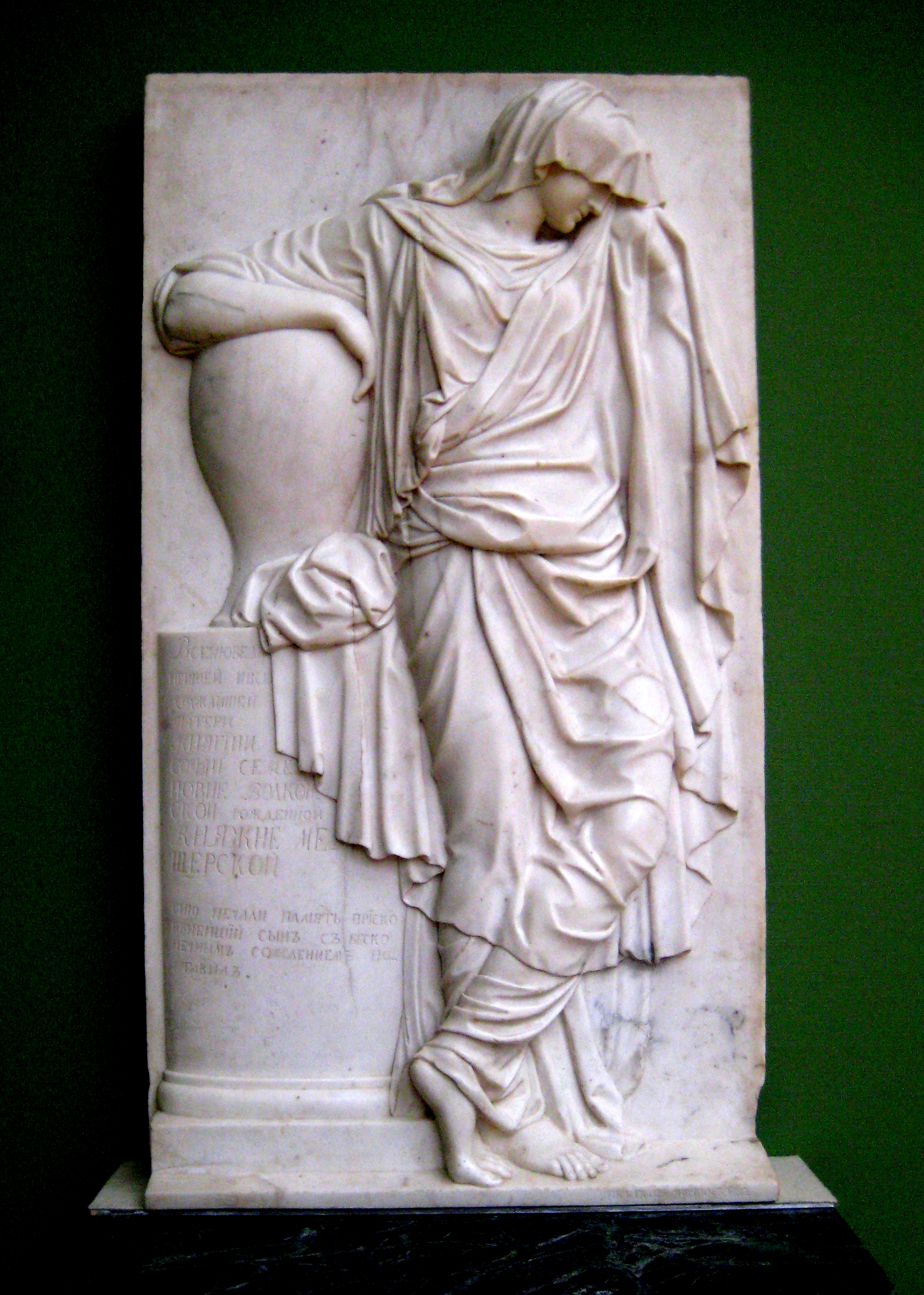
Headstone for
S. S. Volkonsk
