= Koltsovo =

Koltsovo may refer to:

- Koltsovo, Novosibirsk Oblast, an urban-type settlement in Novosibirsk Oblast, Russia
- Koltsovo, Yekaterinburg, a former urban-type settlement in Sverdlovsk Oblast, Russia; now a part of the city of Yekaterinburg
- Koltsovo Airport, an airport in Yekaterinburg, Russia

== See also ==
- Koltsov
