= Koltsov =

Koltsov (Russian: Кольцов; masculine) or Koltsova (Кольцова; feminine) is a common Russian surname. It derives from the Russian nickname "Koltso" (Кольцо).

It is shared by the following people

- Aleksey Koltsov (1808–1842), Russian poet
- Boris Koltsov (b. 1988), Russian darts player
- Diana Koltsova (b. 2008), Russian para swimmer
- Kirill Koltsov (b. 1983), Russian ice hockey player
- Konstantin Koltsov (1981–2024), Belarusian ice hockey player
- Mikhail Koltsov (1898–1940), Soviet journalist
- Mykola Koltsov (1936–2011), Soviet association football player
- Nikolai Koltsov (1872–1940), Soviet/Russian biologist
- Olena Koltsova (b. 1972), Ukrainian Olympic fencer
- Pāvels Koļcovs (Pavel Koltsov) (b. 1982), Latvian association football player

== See also ==
- Koltsovo (disambiguation)
