= Mikhail Peskov =

Russian painter

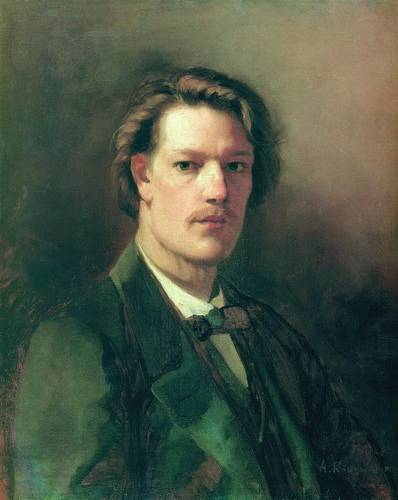
Mikhail Peskov. Portrait by Alexei Korzukhin (1863)

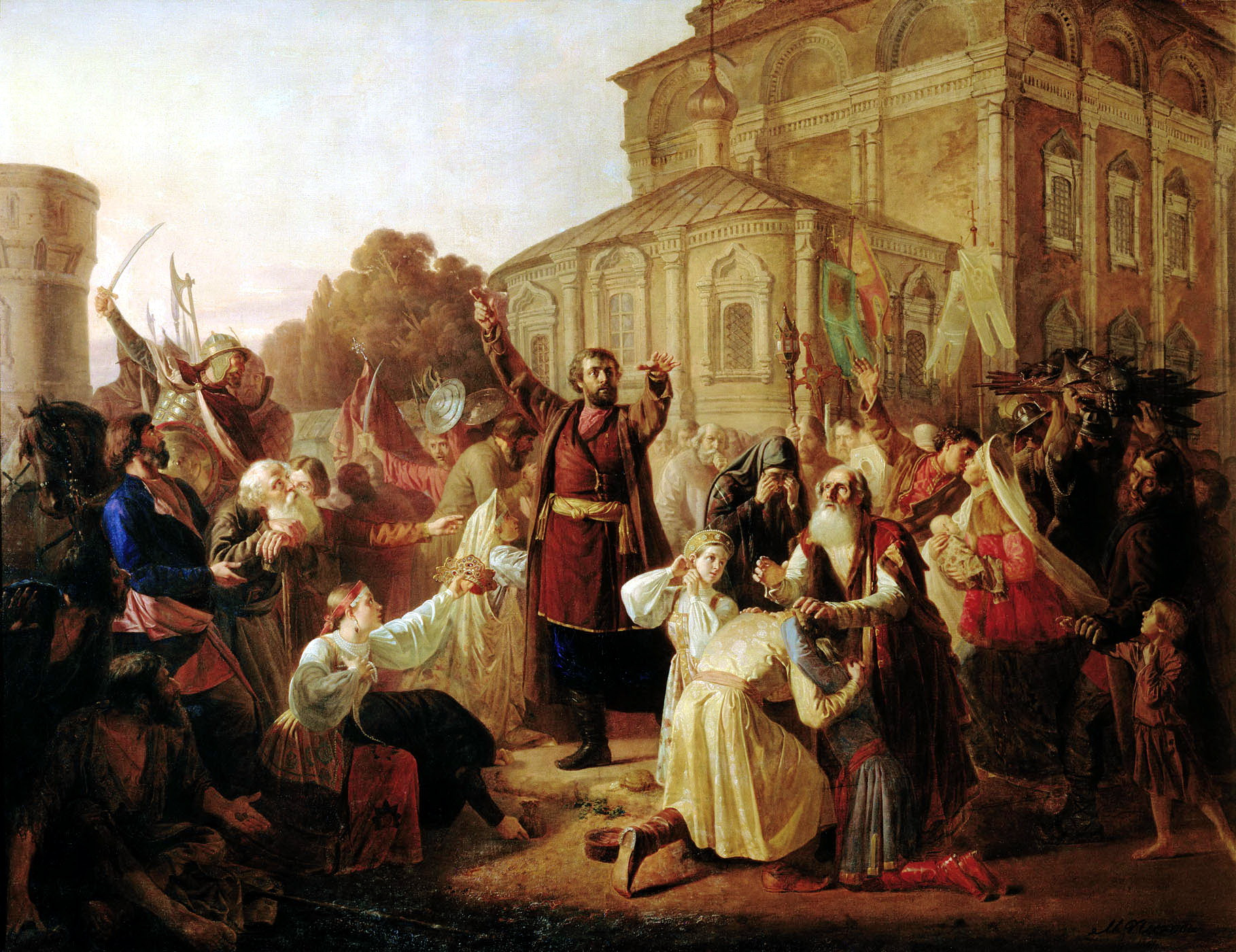
Appeal to the Citizens of Nizhny Novgorod by Kuzma Minin (1861)

Mikhail Ivanovich Peskov (Russian: Михаи́л Ива́нович Песко́в; 1834, in Irkutsk – 13 August 1864, in Yalta) was a history and genre painter and lithographer from the Russian Empire.

== Biography ==
He was born into a military family, stationed in Siberia. From 1850 to 1855, he worked in the office of the Irkutsk Provincial Government. He left to enroll in the Imperial Academy of Arts, where he studied under Alexey Tarasovich Markov. In 1859 and 1860, his work received several silver medals. In 1861, he received a gold medal for his painting "Воззвание к нижегородцам гражданина Минина" (Appeal to the Citizens of Nizhny Novgorod by Minin), which was purchased for 1,000 Rubles by the famous art collector and industrialist, Vasily Kokorev. He was awarded another gold medal in 1862 for "Кулачный бой при Иоанне IV Васильевиче Грозном" (Fistfight with Ivan the Terrible).

In 1863, he joined the "Revolt of the Fourteen", a group of students who favored Realism and were protesting the Academy's insistence on promoting the Classical style. Along with the others, he refused to submit a painting on the required subject and withdrew from the Academy, accepting a designation as "Artist Second-Class". Shortly thereafter, he took part in organizing the Artel of Artists, a type of commune that shared workshops and living space.

In 1864, on his doctor's advice, he went to the Crimea, seeking a cure for his tuberculosis. His friends at the Artel took up a collection and sold artwork to help support his recovery there, but he died, aged only thirty.
