= Monument to Minin and Pozharsky =

Bronze statue in Moscow, Russia

- Па́мятник Ми́нину и Пожа́рскому
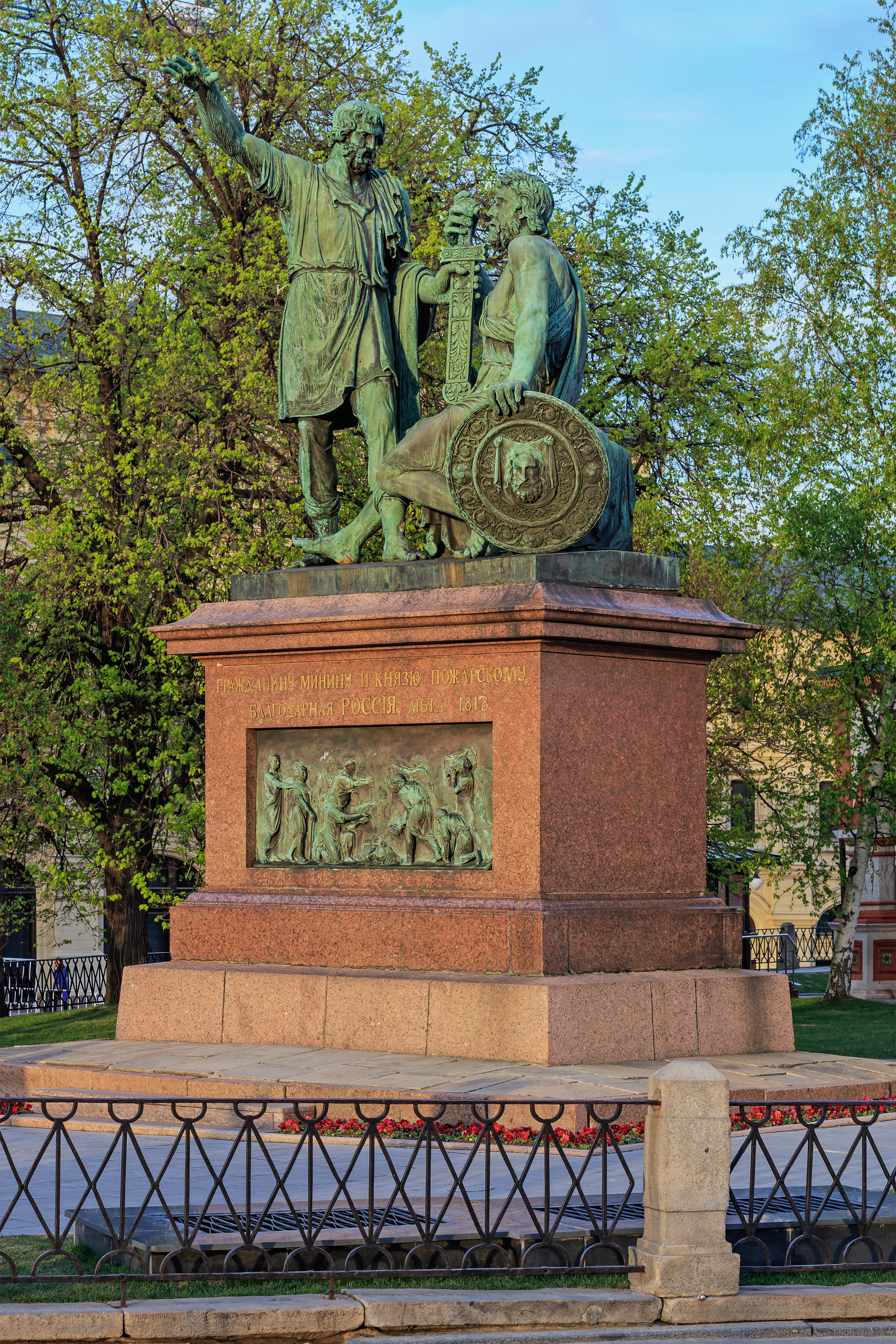
- Pozharsky (sitting) and Minin (standing) monument in Moscow
- Interactive map of Monument to Minin and Pozharsky
- Location: Red Square, Moscow, Russia
- Coordinates: 55.752778°N 37.6225°E
- Designer: Ivan Martos
- Material: bronze
- Beginning date: 1816
- Completion date: 1818

The Monument to Minin and Pozharsky (Russian: Па́мятник Ми́нину и Пожа́рскому) is a bronze statue designed by Ivan Martos and located on the Red Square in Moscow, Russia, in front of Saint Basil's Cathedral. The statue commemorates two Russian national heroes Prince Dmitry Pozharsky and Kuzma Minin, who in 1612 organized a popular uprising that ultimately led to the end of the Polish occupation of Moscow during Polish intervention in Russia, thus putting an end to the Time of Troubles.

== Parameters ==
The height of the monument (with a pedestal) is 8.75 meters, and the weight of the bronze sculpture is 18 tons.

== History ==
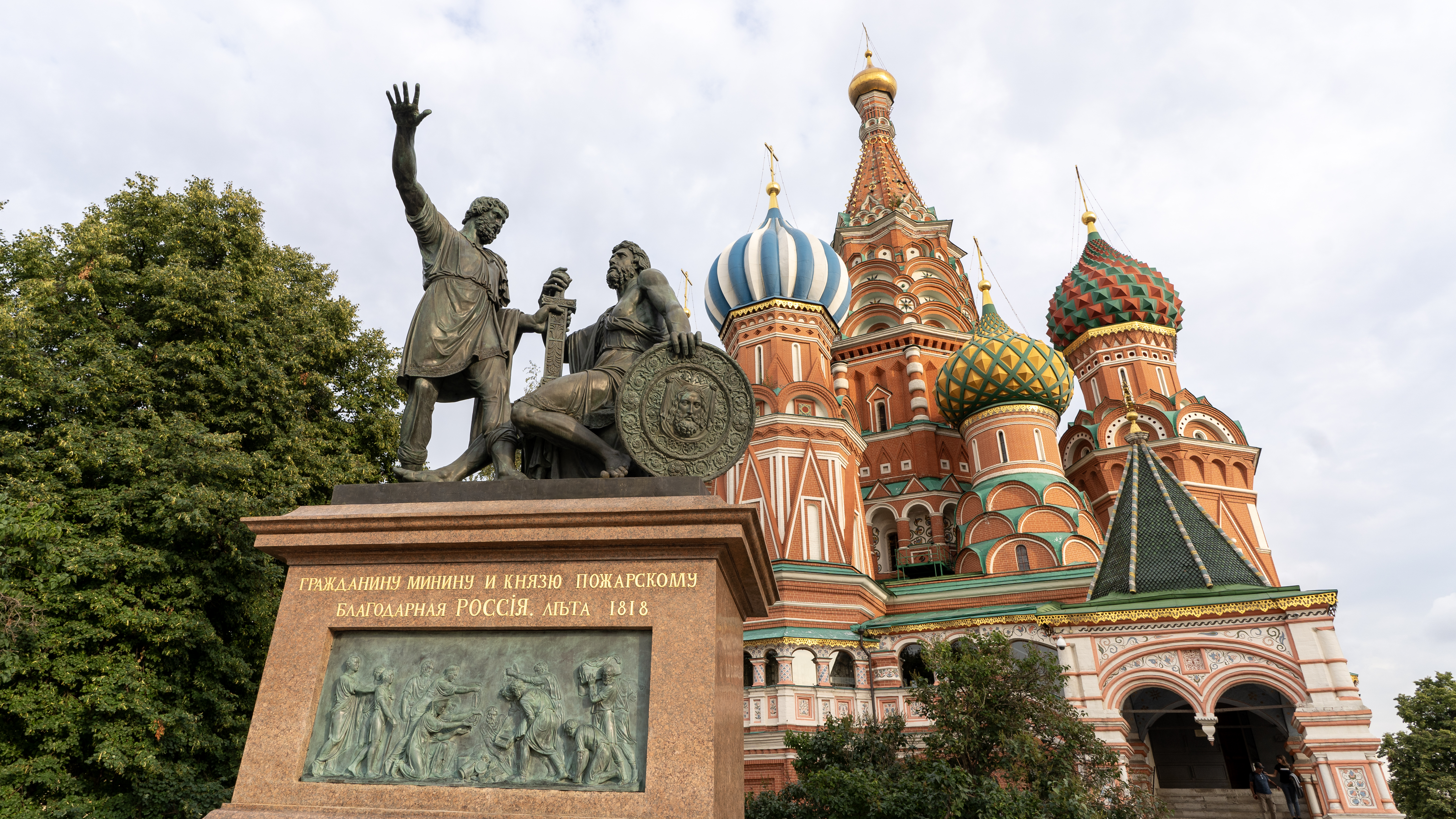
The monument with Saint Basil Cathedral in the background.

The monument was conceived by the Free Society of Lovers of Literature, Science, and the Arts to commemorate the 200th anniversary of those events. Construction was funded by public conscription in Nizhny Novgorod, the city from where Minin and Pozharsky came to save Moscow. Tsar Alexander I, however, decided the monument should be installed on Red Square next to the Moscow Kremlin rather than in Nizhny Novgorod. The competition for the best design was won by the celebrated sculptor Ivan Martos in 1808. Martos completed a model, which was approved by Dowager Empress Maria Feodorovna and the Russian Academy of Fine Arts in 1813. Casting work using 500 kilograms (1,100 lb) of copper was carried out in 1816 in Saint Petersburg. The base, made of three massive blocks of granite from Finland, was also carved at Saint Petersburg. Moving the statue and base to Moscow presented logistical challenges and was accomplished in winter by using the frozen waterways. However, in the wake of Napoleon's invasion of Russia, the monument could not be unveiled until 1818.

The front of the base carries a bronze plaque depicting a scene of patriotic citizens sacrificing their property for the benefit of the motherland. On the left is an image of the sculptor Martos giving away his two sons (one of whom was killed in 1813). The plaque reads "Гражданину Минину и Князю Пожарскому благодарная Россія. Лѣта 1818", or in English, "In memory of citizen Minin and Grand Duke Pozharsky, in 1818 by grateful Russians".

Originally, the statue stood in the centre of Red Square, with Minin extending his hand towards the Moscow Kremlin. However, after the 1917 Revolution, the Communist authorities found the monument was obstructing parades on the square and discussed its demolition or transfer to some indoor museum. In 1936, the statue was moved closer to the cathedral where it remains to the present day.

As it was originally conceived by the sculptor Martos, Prince Pozharsky and Minin were standing side by side. But nobility opposed the concept. It wasn't appropriate for people of different classes to be portrayed on equal terms. Martos redesigned the concept. He has turned the 17th-century heroes of the resistance into ancient history characters. Inequality is highlighted by clothing. Noble prince is in a toga, Minin is in a shirt and trousers.

On the first celebration of the Unity Day, November 4, 2005, an almost exact copy of this monument by Zurab Tsereteli was erected in Nizhny Novgorod. The copy is 5 centimetres (2.0 in) shorter than the Moscow original.

In 2021–22, the monument underwent an extensive restoration, which was performed without displacing or moving the monument. The restoration was carried out by the Interregional Scientific and Restoration Art Department (MNRHU) and the Heritage Restoration Workshop. The action was supported by Vladimir Mashkov, Grigory Leps, Igor Ugolnikov, Oksana Fedorova, Fyokla Tolstaya, among others. The greatest private contribution was made by Vladimir Gruzdev.
