= Peshkov =

Peshkov (Russian: Пешков, Czech: Peškov) is a Russian masculine surname originating from the masculine given name Pyotr (Peter). Its feminine counterpart is Peshkova (Russian: Пешкова, Czech: Pešková). It may refer to:

- Aleksandr Peshkov (born 1972), Russian naval officer
- Igor Peshkov (born 1965), Kazakhstani judoka
- Maxim Gorky (born Aleksey Peshkov; 1868–1936), Russian writer and political activist
- Nadezhda Peshkova (1901–1971), Russian painter
- Yekaterina Peshkova (1887–1965), Russian human rights activist
- Zinovy Peshkov (1884–1966), Russian-born French general and diplomat
- Daniela Pešková (born 1984), Slovak sports shooter
- Eliška Pešková (1833–1895), Czech stage actor and playwright
- Vlasta Pešková (born 1938), Czech javelin thrower

== See also ==
- Peskov
