= Kuzma Minin =

Russian military leader (1570s–1616)

- Кузьма Минин
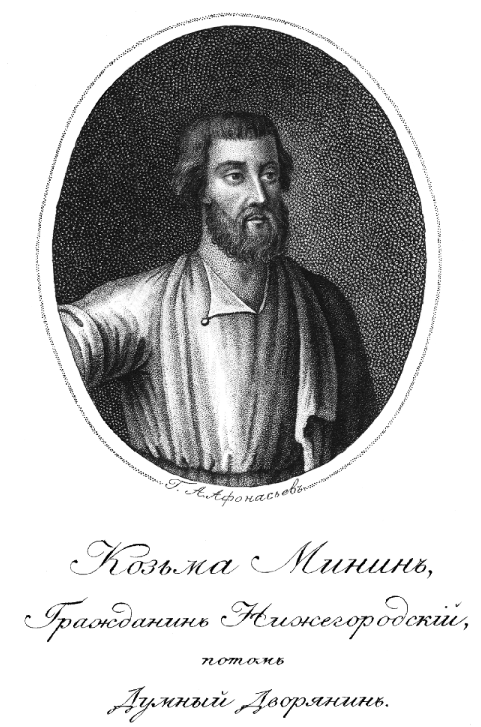

Zemsky headman of Nizhny Novgorod
- In office 1611–1612
- Monarchs: Vacant (officially claimed); Władysław (disputed; unrecognised by him)
- Governor: Alexander Repnin

Personal details
- Born: c. 1570s Balakhna
- Died: 21 May 1616 (aged 40–41)
- Resting place: Nizhny Novgorod Kremlin, St. Michael the Archangel Cathedral; 56.328309°N 44.001899°E
- Domestic partner: Tatiana Semenovna
- Children: Nefed
- Parent: Mina (monk Misail) (father)

Military service
- Allegiance: Russia
- Branch/service: Militia
- Rank: Head of the Second People's Militia
- Battles/wars: Battle of Moscow

Kuzma Minin (Russian: Кузьма Минин), full name Kuzma Minich Zakhariev-Sukhoruky (Russian: Кузьма Минич Захарьев Сухорукий; c. 1570s – 21 May 1616), was a Russian merchant who, together with Prince Dmitry Pozharsky, formed the popular uprising in Nizhny Novgorod against the Polish–Lithuanian Commonwealth's occupation of Russia during the Polish intervention in Russia (1605-1618) coinciding with the Time of Troubles. The popular uprising ultimately led to Russian victory at the Battle of Moscow and the end of Polish occupation in 1612. Minin and Pozharsky become national heroes in Russian culture and were honored in the Monument to Minin and Pozharsky in Moscow's Red Square.

A native of Balakhna, Minin was a prosperous butcher in Nizhny Novgorod. When the popular patriotic movement to organize volunteer corps in his home city was formed, the merchants chose Minin, a trusted and respected member of the guild, to oversee the handling of the public funds donated by them to raise and equip the Second Volunteer Army (Russian: Второе народное ополчение).

The army, led by Prince Pozharsky, was credited with clearing the Moscow Kremlin of Polish forces on 1 November 1612. Minin distinguished himself as a skilled commander and was made a nobleman and member of the boyar duma under the newly elected tsar of Russia Michael Romanov. He died in 1616 and was interred in the Archangel Cathedral of Nizhny Novgorod. A central square of that city is named after him and Prince Pozharsky.

== Family ==
Minin had a single son, Nefed. After Minin's death his property rights passed to his widow, Tatiana Semenovna, and his son. A royal decree was issued on 5 July 1616, confirming the family's possession of an estate in the Nizhny Novgorod district consisting of the town of Bogorodskoye with its associated villages. Additionally, Nefed Minin owned property in the Kremlin of Nizhny Novgorod, although after the completion of his service, he lived mostly in Moscow where he worked as a government clerk. In 1625 he attended the departure of the Persian ambassador and in 1626 he is recorded as standing by the sovereign's lantern at two royal weddings. No mention is made of him in official records after 1628. Nefed died in 1632 and the lands granted to his father reverted to the crown before being passed to Prince Jacob Kudenekovich Cherkassky.

Tatiana Minina continued to live in Nizhny Novgorod. It appears that at an advanced age she took monastic vows and entered a convent – most likely the Resurrection Convent, located inside the city's Kremlin.

== Historical analysis ==
Minin is generally well regarded by later historians such as Ivan Zabelin and Mikhail Pogodin, having gained respect for his heroic actions.

== Depictions ==
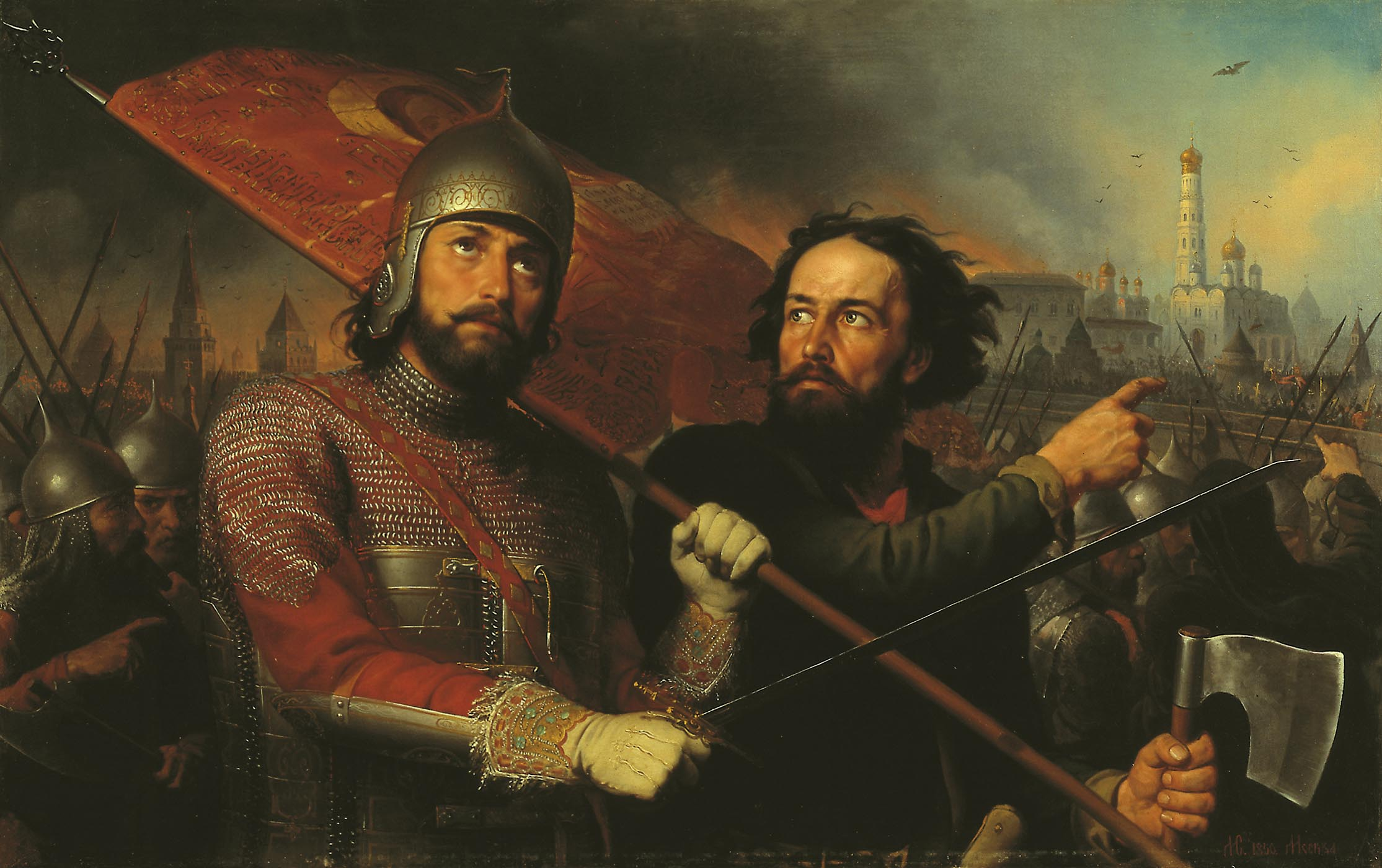
Minin and Pozharsky (right to left) by Mikhail Scotti, 1850

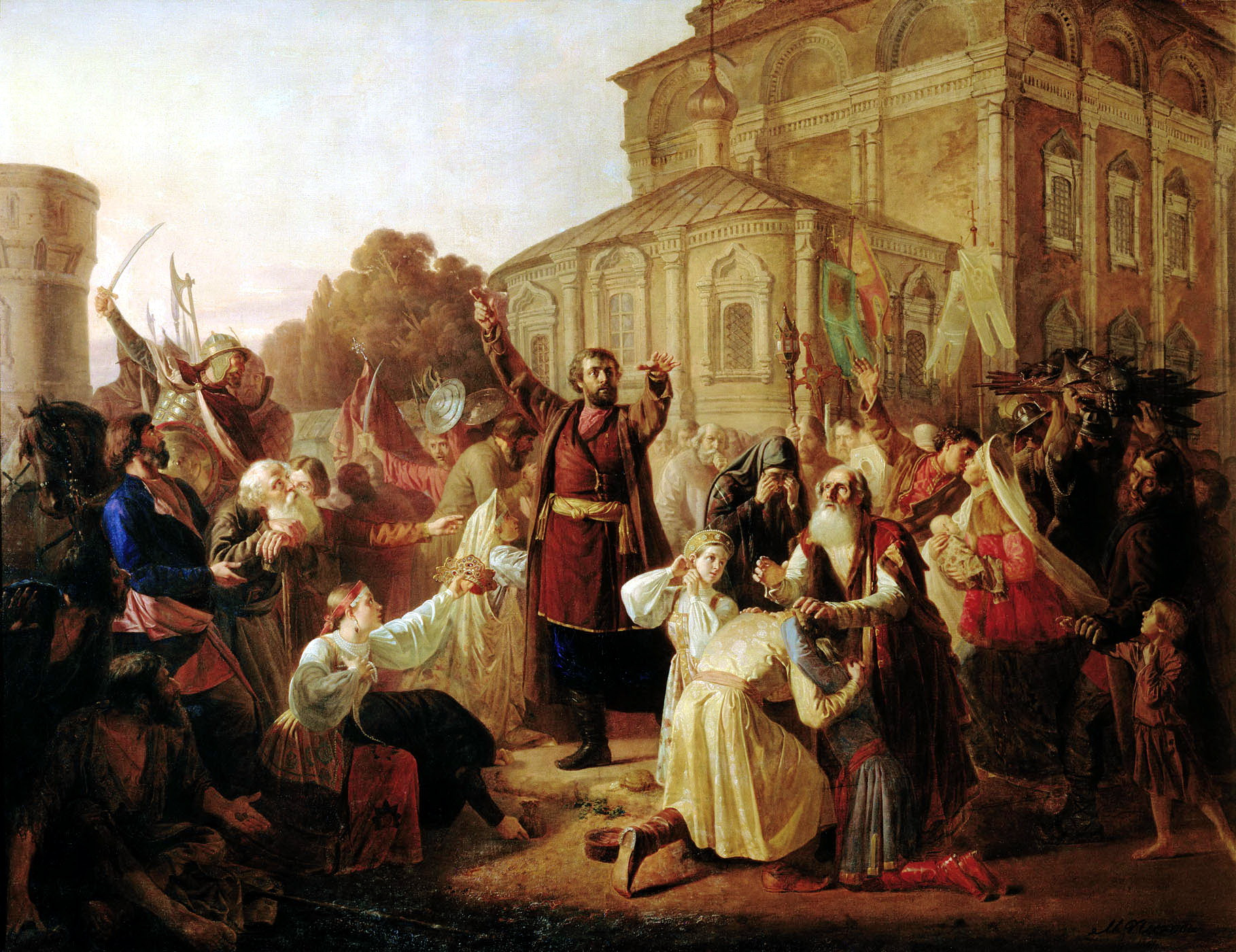
Minin's appeal to the people of Nizhny Novgorod. Painting by Mikhail Peskov, 1861

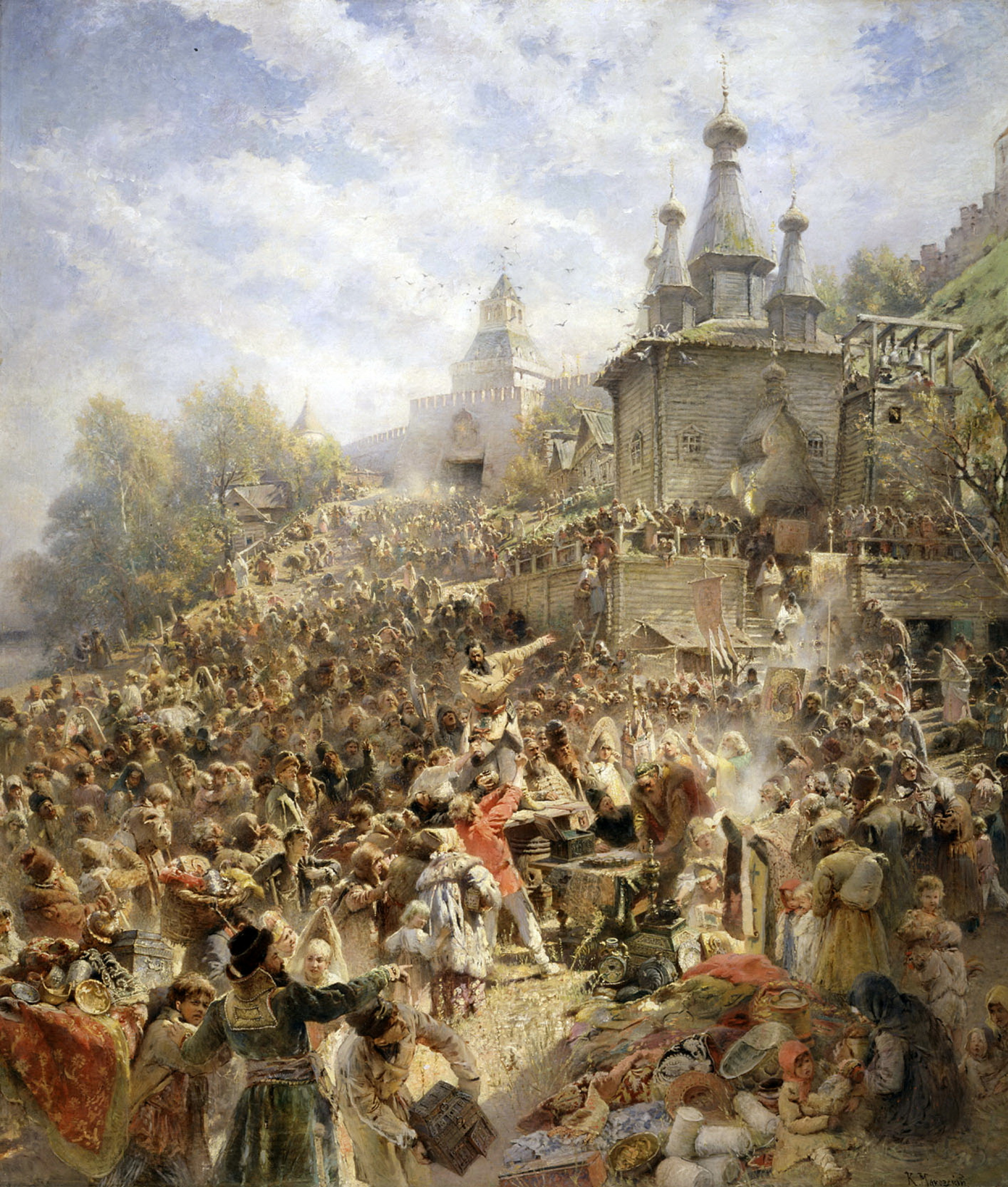
Konstantin Makovsky's Appeal of Minin (1896) depicts Kuzma Minin against the background of the church of St. John the Baptist appealing to the people of Nizhny Novgorod to raise a militia against the Polish invaders and Sigismund III Vasa.

== See also ==
- Monument to Minin and Pozharsky
