= Novgorod Republic =

Russian city-state (1136–1478)

Coordinates: 58°31′17″N 31°16′31″E

Lord Novgorod the Great Господин Великий Новгород
- 1136–1478
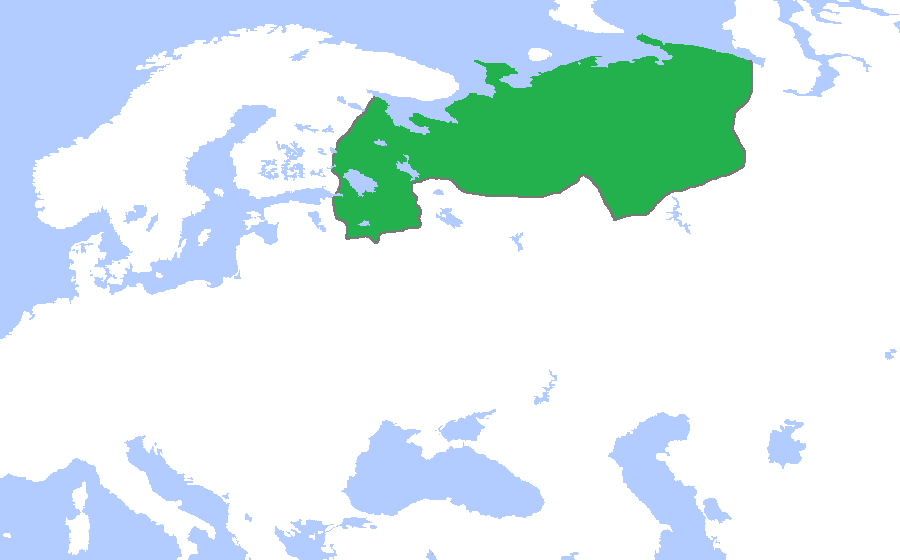
- The Novgorod Republic c. 1400
- Capital: Novgorod
- Common languages: Russian (Old Novgorod dialect); Church Slavonic^{1}
- Religion: Russian Orthodoxy
- Demonym: Novgorodian
- Government: Mixed republic
- Prince
  - 1136–1138 (first): Sviatoslav Olgovich
  - 1462–1478 (last): Ivan III Vasilyevich
- Legislature: Veche; Council of Lords
- History
  - Established: 1136
  - Disestablished: 1478
Preceded by	Succeeded by
Kievan Rus'	Pskov Republic; Grand Principality of Moscow
- Today part of: Russia
- 1: Liturgical and literary language

The Novgorod Republic (Russian: Новгородская республика, romanized: Novgorodskaya respublika), formally known as Lord Novgorod the Great, (Note: Russian: Господин Великий Новгород, romanized: Gospodin Veliky Novgorod. From the end of the 14th century, it was known as Sovereign Lord Novgorod the Great. Russian: Государь Господин Великий Новгород, romanized: Gosudar Gospodin Veliky Novgorod.) was a city-state that existed from the 12th to the 15th centuries in northwestern Russia and extended from the Gulf of Finland in the west to the Ural Mountains in the east. Its capital was Novgorod. The republic prospered as the easternmost trading post of the Hanseatic League, while its people were much influenced by the culture of the Byzantines. The Novgorod school of icon painting produced many fine works, and for much of its history, the city was the center of Russian art and culture.

Novgorod formally gained its independence in 1136 after the Novgorodians deposed their prince and the Novgorodian veche (popular assembly) began to elect and dismiss princes at its discretion. By the 13th century, the prince's power had greatly diminished in favor of republican judicial proceedings. The veche also elected the posadnik, the city's chief executive, as well as the archbishop of Novgorod, whose appointment was subject to approval by the metropolitan of the Russian Orthodox Church. (Note: The veche chose its bishop for the first time in 1156. From 1165, the bishop of Novgorod became known as the archbishop of Novgorod.) In addition, the tysyatsky, originally the military commander, was elected by the veche to represent the interests of the common people, eventually taking on judicial and commercial functions. Novgorodian nobles known as boyars dominated the veche; the offices of posadnik and tysyatsky remained in the hands of boyar families. The boyars also funded the ushkuyniki, who contributed to the expansion of Novgorod's trade networks and colonies in the Russian North.

From the mid-13th century, the Novgorodian throne remained in the hands of the grand princes of Vladimir, a title that, by the 14th century, had passed to the prince of Moscow. The city recognized the nominal suzerainty of the Russian grand princes, but retained its autonomy. However, as Moscow grew in power during the 15th century, Novgorod began to lose its autonomy. Following the Battle of Shelon in 1471, the city became subordinate to Moscow. Nevertheless, it retained some degree of autonomy, with its republican institutions remaining intact. The republic came to an end in 1478, when Ivan III dismantled the veche and imposed his direct rule over Novgorod as part of his campaign to consolidate the Russian states under the authority of Moscow.

== Name ==
Novgorod the Great (Russian: Великий Новгород, romanized: Veliky Novgorod), alternatively all Novgorod the Great, (Note: Russian: весь Великий Новгород.) became established as the official title no later than the 1330s. The title Lord Novgorod the Great (Russian: Господин Великий Новгород, romanized: Gospodin Veliky Novgorod) was later adopted; the form Sovereign Lord Novgorod the Great (Russian: Государь Господин Великий Новгород, romanized: Gosudar Gospodin Veliky Novgorod) became common by the 15th century.

The term Novgorod the Great was also used to refer to all Novgorodians who enjoyed full rights. Novgorod land and Novgorod volost usually referred to the land belonging to Novgorod.

The term Novgorod Republic (Russian: Новгородская республика, romanized: Novgorodskaya respublika) itself is a much later term, although the polity was described as a republic as early as in the beginning of the 16th century.

== History ==
=== Origins ===
The area of Novgorod was populated by various East Slavic tribes that were constantly at war with one another for supremacy. According to the 12th-century Primary Chronicle, in 859, the Varangians began to levy tribute on these tribes, who chased out the Varangians three years later. Due to their inability to govern and maintain peace, the tribes requested the return of the Varangians. In 862, the Varangian brothers Rurik, Sineus and Truvor were each "invited" to reign in Novgorod, Beloozero, and Izborsk, respectively, in what is now northwestern Russia. As a result, Novgorod is traditionally viewed as the birthplace of the Russian monarchy in Russian historiography.

The Primary Chronicle states that when Oleg the Wise conquered Kiev in 882, which traditionally marks the beginning of Kievan Rus', he ordered Novgorod to pay tribute to the Varangian princes in Kiev. Although the Chronicle states that "Oleg set himself up as prince in Kiev, and declared that it should be the mother of Russian cities," this account differs from what most Latin and Greek sources report for the next century. For example, in De Administrando Imperio, Novgorod is still presented as the capital of the Rus', while Kiev is mentioned only as an outpost.

The "Russian–Scandinavian cultural symbiosis" became prevalent following the establishment of the state of Rus'. The Novgorodians were the first to reach the regions between the Arctic Ocean and Lake Onega. Even though there is no definitive account of the precise timing of their arrival at the northern rivers that flowed into the Arctic, there are chronicles which mention that one expedition reached the Pechora River in 1032, and trading was established as early as 1096 with the tribes of Yugra. The Chronicle mentions Novgorodians traveling "beyond the portage" as early as 1079. They also traveled to Pomorye, the "summer [southern] coast" of the "Cold [White] Sea" in search of furs as well as fish and salt. The historian George Lantzeff remarked that "in the beginning of Russian history, two Russian principalities, Novgorod and Rostov-Suzdal, were engaged in exploring, conquering, exploiting, and colonizing the area west of the Ural Mountains".

From the 11th century, the Novgorodians asserted greater control over the determination of their rules, and rejected a politically dependent relationship to Kiev. During this period, Novgorod developed its unique form of government, which consisted of the posadnichestvo (mayoralty) and the veche (popular assembly).

=== 12th century ===
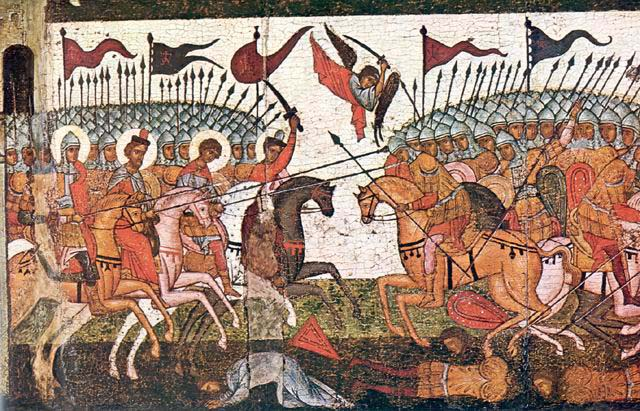
Battle of the Novgorodians with the Suzdalians in 1170, fragment of a 1460 icon

The chronicles state that the Novgorodians paid tribute to the grand prince of Kiev by 1113. Some time after this, the administration of the principality seemed to have matured. The Novgorodian tysyatsky and posadniki appointed boyars from the cities and collected revenues for administration in the territories it held. A charter from the 1130s mentioned 30 administrative posts in the territory of Novgorod, where revenues were collected regularly and sent as a tithe to the Novgorod bishop. Throughout the 12th century, Novgorod utilized the Baltic–Volga–Caspian trade route, not only for trading but also for bringing food from the fertile Oka region to their city.

On a number of occasions, the Novgorodian nobles refused to accept the prince sent from Kiev. This struggle culminated in 1136, when the Novgorodians revolted and dismissed their prince Vsevolod Mstislavich. Over the next century and half, the Novgorodians were able to invite in and dismiss a number of princes, and although the rule of princes was not completely eliminated, their power had been greatly reduced, to the point that they were simply hired officials. Princely power was already non-hereditary, and as a result, the prince was a symbol of the political union of Novgorod with the principality from which they were invited. However, these invitations or dismissals were often based on who was the dominant prince.

The Novgorodians sought to maintain the balance of power by alternating their invitations to princes from different regional centers, including the principalities of Rostov-Suzdal (later Vladimir-Suzdal) and Kiev, whose prince remained the "eldest" among the Rurikids until 1169. Although the beginning of the republican period is traditionally considered to be 1136, the development of republican institutions in Novgorod was a much more complicated process that began earlier and ended much later. According to the historian John L. I. Fennell: "But it must not be imagined that Novgorod in the twelfth century and the first forty years of the thirteenth was in any way close to becoming a republic. Strong rulers could always oblige the city to accept their nominees... The fact is that Novgorod was always militarily vulnerable and whatever troops it could itself provide were never sufficient or competent enough to defend it".

Rostov-Suzdal comprised the territory of the important Oka region and lands along the vital Sheksna River. This river lay in the Northern Volga tributary region. Whoever controlled the river was able to block food supplies causing a famine in Novgorod. Perhaps due to these fears, Novgorod led a failed invasion of Suzdal in 1134. They tried again and succeeded in 1149. Alternatively, Novgorod, in a bid to appease Suzdal, accepted some Suzdalians as rulers of Novgorod. Despite these events, Suzdal still blocked off trade to Novgorod twice and intercepted Novgorod's tributes. Novgorod gradually became a major trade power in the Baltic following the establishment of permanent foreign trade centers. Traders from Gotland arrived and founded the Gothic court around the turn of the 12th century. Around the late 12th or early 13th century, the Peterhof was established.

By 1156, Novgorod had won the right to choose its own bishop. In 1165, the bishop was elevated to archiepiscopal status. The election of the bishop was carried out by the veche, and thus, Novgorod had an almost independent religious administration, which allowed it to enter its golden age. The chronicles describe the first election of the bishop of Novgorod by the veche:

Archbishop Niphont died... that same year all the townspeople gathered together and decided to appoint as their bishop Arkadii, a man chosen by God; and all the people went and took him out of the Monastery of the Holy Virgin [in the presence of Prince] Mstislav Iur'evich, all the clergy of Holy Wisdom, all the town priests, and all the abbots and monks; and they installed him, entrusting him with the bishopric in the metropolitan in the court of Holy Wisdom, until there should be a metropolitan in Russia and then he should go be consecrated.

=== 13th century ===
In 1228, there was a failed Novgorodian campaign against the Tavastians in present-day southern Finland, as reported in the Novgorod First Chronicle (NPL). The Novgorodian troops were disaffected by prince Yaroslav Vsevolodovich, a quarrel broke out within the army and the troops refused to fight. In the same year, Yaroslav tried to militarily overrun the rebellious town of Pskov (possibly because its throne was vacant), but the Pskovians closed their gates in time and denied him entry. Yaroslav retreated to Novgorod, claimed no ill will towards Pskov, but raised another army supposedly for the purpose of attacking Riga (a stronghold of the Livonian Brothers of the Sword). But the Pskovians distrusted him and allied with Riga instead, while the troop raising caused food prices in Novgorod to spike, stoking civil discontent against prince Yaroslav as well; opposition to the Suzdalian dynasty's power grew amongst citizens of both Pskov and Novgorod. As they rejected support for his campaign against Riga, suspecting a ploy to seize Pskov along the way after the previous failed attempt, Yaroslav was forced to abandon his plans and disband his expensive army. When a bad harvest exacerbated the famine, the Novogorodians rose in revolt against the prince, who fled with his family and supporters to Pereslavl-Zalessky. With the Suzdalian princely threat gone, the Pskovians sent the Livonian auxiliaries home, while the veche elected Michael of Chernigov as Novgorod's new knyaz in 1230. The NPL notes that in subsequent years, Pskov remained allied with Riga and the Rigans, and later Dorpat (modern Tartu) and Odenpäh (modern Otepää). Meanwhile, Yaroslav Vladimirovich, a son of the previous Pskovian prince Vladimir Mstislavich of Pskov sought to leverage his family ties with the bishops Hermann of Dorpat and Albert of Riga (died 1229) to gain his father's throne.

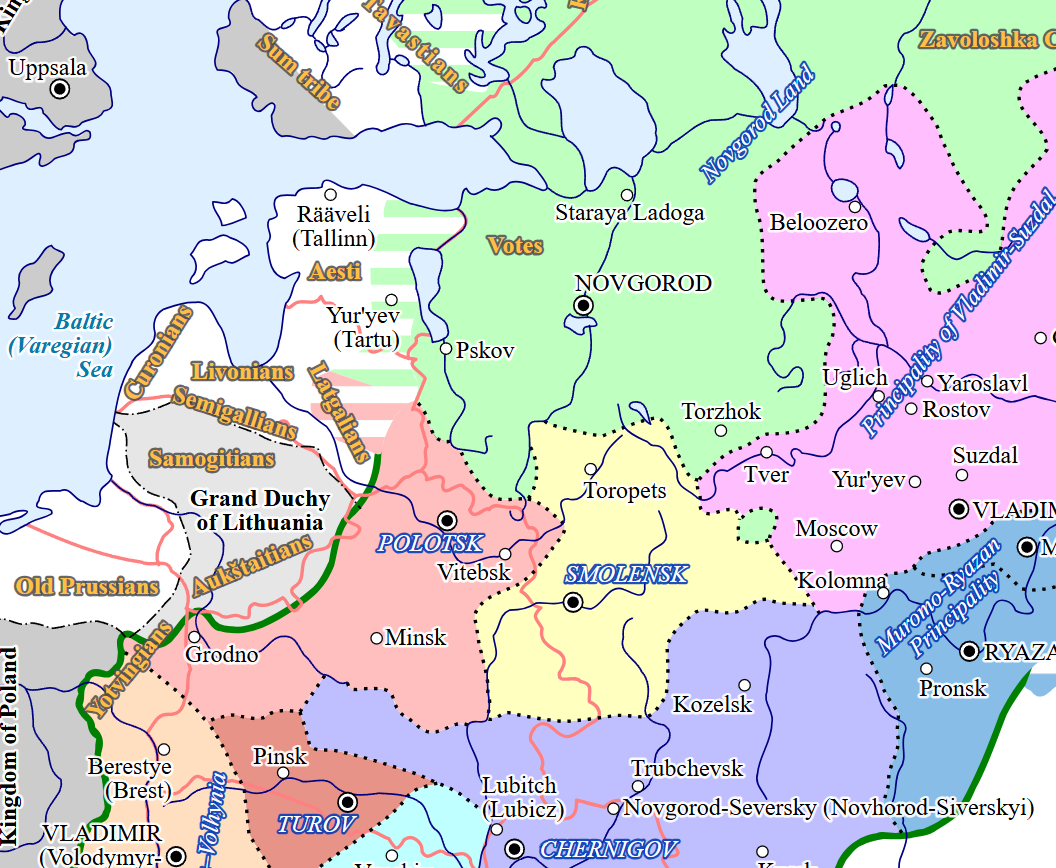
Regional situation in 1237: Livonia (various factions) Lithuania Novgorod Vladimir-Suzdal Smolensk Chernigov

The famine in Novgorod continued, and in 1230, another popular revolt erupted against supporters of the brand new prince Michael of Chernigov, including the tysyatsky Boris Negochevich. The desperate Novgorodian people asked for Yaroslav of Suzdal to return, which he did at the end of 1230, but the famine got even worse in spring 1231, until German merchants sailing from overseas were able to import sufficient amounts of grain and flour to relieve the Republic's hunger. In autumn 1231, Yaroslav took Novgorodian troops on a campaign to Chernigov against his rival Michael. In 1232, there were anti-Yaroslav rebellions in Novgorod and Pskov, but only the latter was successful in chasing the Suzdalians out of town.

In 1233, Boris Negochevich and other Novgorodian nobles joined forces with Yaroslav Vladimirovich (pretender-prince of Pskov) and some Sword Brothers, occupying Izborsk in 1233, but they were soon expelled by the Pskovian army, while the pretender was captured, handed over to Yaroslav of Suzdal and imprisoned in Pereslavl-Zalessky. In 1234, Yaroslav of Suzdal campaigned against the bishopric of Dorpat. The 1234 peace agreement was based on that of 1224; it did not involve any territorial issues, but only a prisoner exchange and Dorpat's promise to stop supporting factions in Pskov and Novgorod that opposed Yaroslav of Suzdal. Yaroslav went to Kiev in 1235, leaving his 15- or 16-year-old son Aleksandr Yaroslavich behind in Novgorod.

Although the Northern Crusades were aimed at pagan Balts and Finns, rather than Orthodox Russians, several unsuccessful attempts were made to persuade Novgorod to convert to Catholicism after the capture of Tartu. Novgorod also fought against the Crusaders for economic reasons, to protect their monopoly of the Karelian fur trade. In Livonia, although the missionaries and Crusaders had attempted to establish peaceful relations with Novgorod, Livonian missionary and Crusade activity in Estonia caused conflicts with Novgorod, which had also attempted to subjugate, raid and convert the pagan Estonians. The Estonians would also sometimes ally with the Russians against the Crusaders, since the eastern Baltic missions also constituted a threat to Russian interests and the tributary peoples.

According to Russian sources, during the Northern Crusades, the Novgorodian prince Alexander Yaroslavich defeated the Swedes at the Battle of the Neva in July 1240, from which he received the sobriquet Nevsky ("of the Neva"). Alexander then defeated German crusaders at the Battle on the Ice in 1242, after the forces of the exiled prince of Pskov and men from the Bishopric of Dorpat attacked Pskov Land and Votia, a tributary of Novgorod. This later led to him being depicted as an ideal ruler in chronicles such as the Life of Alexander Nevsky. Novgorod was also spared by the Mongol armies during the Mongol invasions after Alexander Nevsky agreed to pay tribute. Historians such as J. L. I. Fennell have called the proportions of Nevsky's victories as having been overblown; he also argued that there was no existence of a unified Western scheme of aggression against Russia and that Nevsky appeased the Mongols, while many Russian historians have argued that Nevsky was being wise, with cooperation with the Mongols being the only sensible option at the time which averted further tragedy.

=== 14th century ===
Tver, Moscow and Lithuania fought over control of Novgorod and its enormous wealth from the 14th century. Upon receiving the jarlig for grand prince of Vladimir in 1304, Mikhail Yaroslavich of Tver sent his governors to Novgorod. A series of disagreements with Mikhail pushed Novgorod towards closer ties with Moscow during the reign of Yury. In part, Tver's proximity (the Tver principality was contiguous with Novgorod Land) threatened Novgorod. It was feared that a Tverian prince would annex Novgorod's territory, and thus weaken the republic. At the time, though, Moscow did not border Novgorod, and since the Muscovite princes were further afield, they were more acceptable as princes of Novgorod. They could come to Novgorod's aid when needed but would be too far away to meddle too much in the republic's affairs.

The city of Pskov, initially part of Novgorod Land, became de facto independent as early as the 13th century after opening a trading post for merchants of the Hanseatic League. Several princes such as Vsevolod Mstislavich (d. 1138) and Dovmont (d. 1299) served in Pskov without any deference to, or consultation with, the prince or other officials in Novgorod. Pskov won its formal independence in August 1348 after Magnus IV of Sweden captured the key fortress of Orekhov. The Pskovites sent a small detachment and took advantage of the situation by only agreeing to accompany the Novgorodian army on the condition that Pskov would be formally granted its independence. Novgorod sent an allied force to lay siege to the fortress and signed the Treaty of Bolotovo (1348) on the way to Orekhov. As per the terms of the treaty, the posadniki of Novgorod no longer had any administrative or judicial function in Pskov and the law-courts of the archbishop of Novgorod would only be run by representatives chosen by the Pskovites. However, the archbishop of Novgorod continued to head the church in Pskov and kept the title of archbishop of Novgorod the Great and Pskov until 1589.

As Moscow grew in strength, however, the Muscovite princes became a serious threat to Novgorod. Ivan I, Simeon, and other princes sought to limit Novgorod's independence. In 1397, a critical conflict took place between Moscow and Novgorod, when Moscow annexed the Dvina Lands along the course of the Northern Dvina. These lands were crucial to Novgorod's well-being since much of the city's furs came from there. This territory was returned to Novgorod the following year after Novgorod sent ambassadors to the grand prince of Moscow.

=== 15th century ===
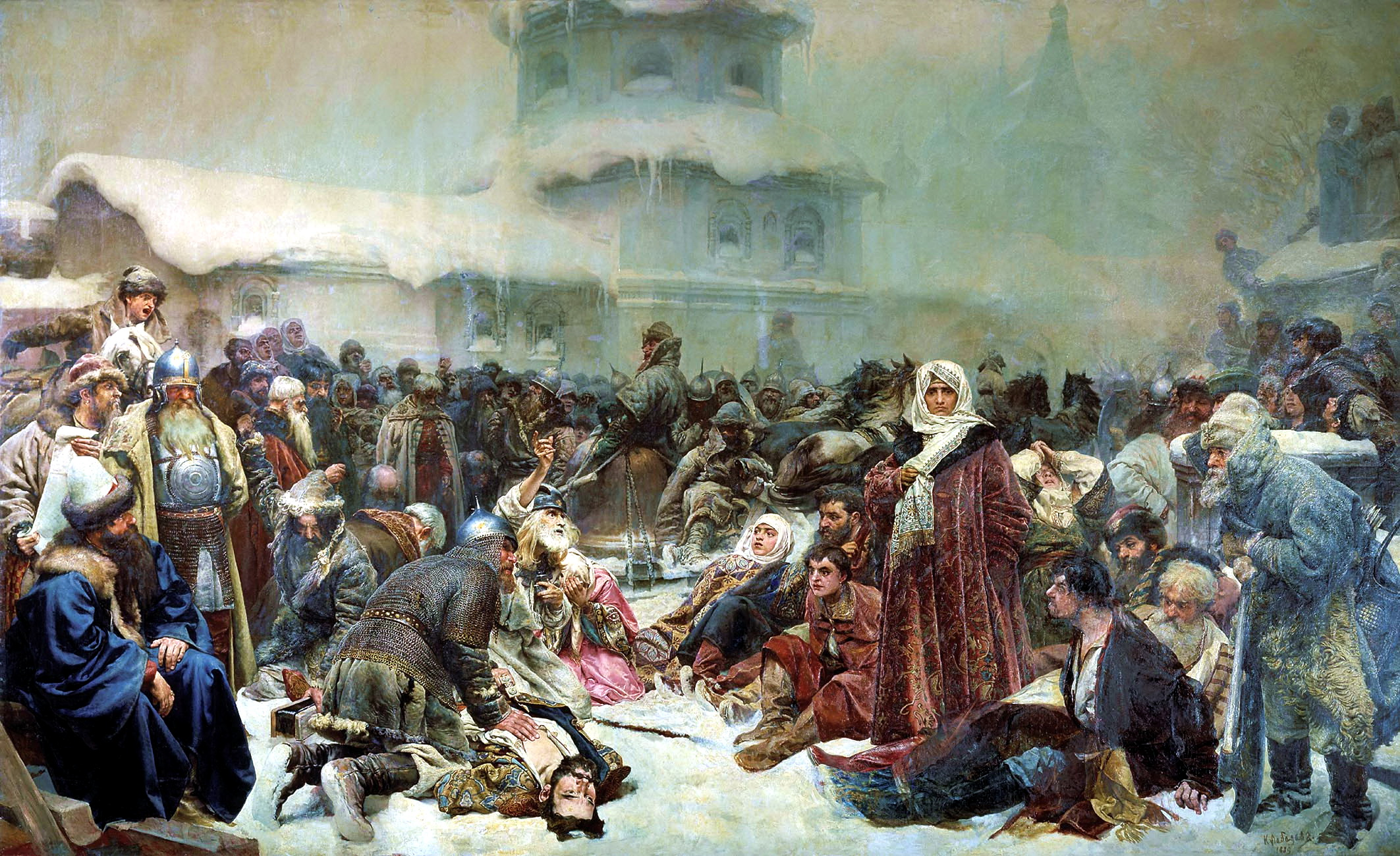
Martha the Mayoress at the Destruction of the Novgorod Veche, painting by Klavdiy Lebedev, 1889

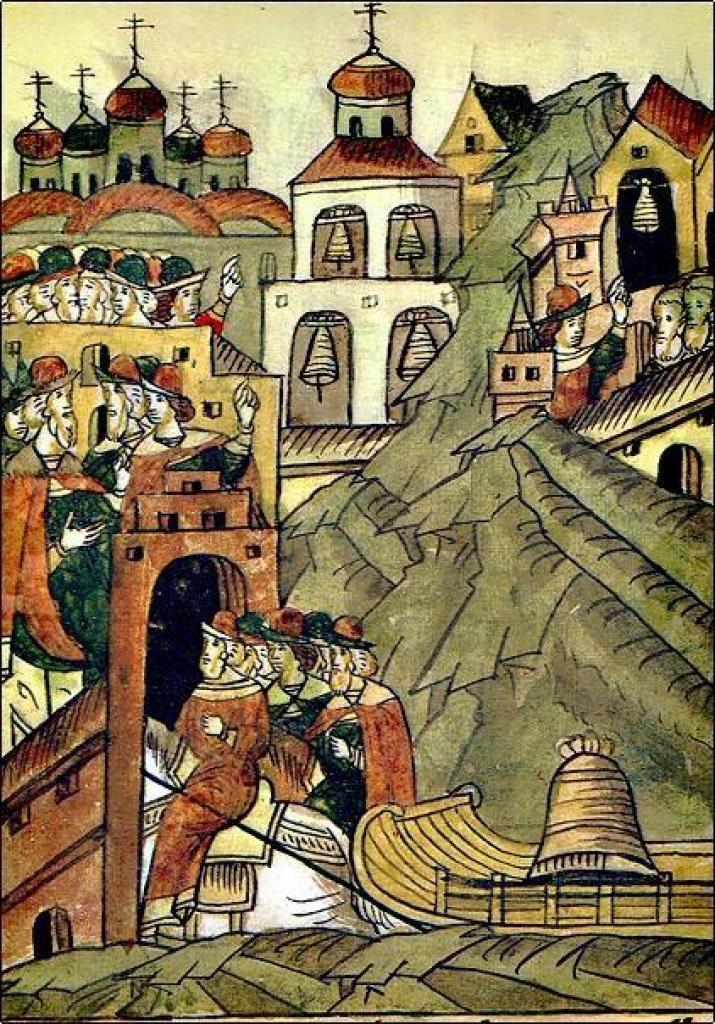
The removal of the veche bell from Novgorod, miniature from the Illustrated Chronicle of Ivan the Terrible, 16th century

In the 12th to 15th centuries, the Novgorod Republic expanded east and northeast. The Novgorodians explored the areas around Lake Onega, along the Northern Dvina, and coastlines of the White Sea. At the beginning of the 14th century, the Novgorodians explored the Arctic Ocean, the Barents Sea, the Kara Sea, and the West-Siberian river Ob. The lands to the north of the city provided fur—the main export commodity ensuring the prosperity of Novgorod—sea fauna, and salt. Novgorod fought a protracted series of wars with Moscow beginning in the late 14th century in order to keep these lands.

Novgorod supported Dmitry Shemyaka against Vasily Vasilievich in the Muscovite War of Succession (1425–1453). After Vasily II returned to throne, a war between Moscow and Novgorod took place, which ended after the Treaty of Yazhelbitsy was signed in 1456. The treaty marked the beginning of the fall of Novgorod's independence as it lost certain freedoms. Moscow began to gradually seize land in the northern territories that were formerly under Novgorod's control for the next decade and a half due to a desire for luxury furs in the area. This led to a struggle with Novgorod for the Russian fur trade, and thus, an economic rivalry for fur, land and trade ports.

Some Novgorodian boyars were opposed to Moscow as a result, while others pursued a pro-Muscovite policy in the hopes that good relations with Moscow would reduce disruption in Novgorod's trade; Novgorod was also dependent on the Russian lands to its southwest for important imports such as grain. Some Novgorodians were also attracted to Moscow due to it being the center of Russian Orthodoxy as opposed to Lithuania, where Catholicism was dominant and its culture was being increasingly polonized, though some Novgorodian clergy adopted a pro-Lithuanian policy for political reasons due to fears that embracing the grand prince of Moscow would eventually lead to the end of Novgorod's independence. Most Novgorodian boyars had hoped to maintain the republic's independence since if Novgorod were to be conquered, the boyars' wealth would flow to the grand prince and Muscovite boyars, and the Novgorodians would fall into decline; most of them also did not earn enough to pay for war.

By 1470, with the pro-Lithuanian faction being dominant, the Novgorodian boyars questioned Ivan's sovereignty over Novgorod as their prince. Novgorod negotiated with the Grand Duchy of Lithuania for a new prince to be sent over. This led to Mikhailo Olelkovich, a cousin of Ivan III, to be accepted. According to tradition, Marfa Boretskaya, the wife of the posadnik Isaak Boretsky, was the main proponent of an alliance with Poland–Lithuania to save the republic. According to this legend, Boretskaya invited the Lithuanian princeling Mikhailo Olelkovich and asked him to become her husband and the ruler of Novgorod. She also concluded an alliance with Casimir, the king of Poland and grand duke of Lithuania. The prospects of changing allegiance in favor of the allied Kingdom of Poland and Grand Duchy of Lithuania caused a major commotion among the commoners. Janet Martin and Gail Lenhoff have recently argued that Boretskaya was scapegoated, probably by Archbishop Feofil (r. 1470–1480) in order to shift the blame from him for his betrayal of the terms of the Treaty of Yazhelbitsy, which forbade Novgorod from conducting foreign affairs without grand princely approval. While the extent of Boretskaya's role in the Lithuanian party is probably exaggerated, Novgorod did indeed try to turn to the king of Poland. A draft treaty, allegedly found among the loot after the Battle of Shelon, was drawn up between Casimir and the Novgorodians.

The Muscovite authorities regarded Novgorod's behavior as a repudiation of the Treaty of Yazhelbitsy (1456) and went to war against the city. The Muscovite army won a decisive victory at the Battle of Shelon River in July 1471, leading to the signing of the Treaty of Korostyn. Novgorod became subordinate to Moscow, explicitly recognizing itself as the votchina (patrimony) of the grand prince of Moscow. Nevertheless, it retained some degree of autonomy, with its republican institutions remaining intact. For the next six years, pro-Moscow and anti-Moscow factions in Novgorod competed with one another. Ivan III visited Novgorod several times during this period, persecuting a number of pro-Lithuanian boyars and confiscating their lands. In 1478, Ivan III sent his army to take direct control of the city. He abolished the local government, including the veche, and replaced it with his namestnik, or governor, who directly reported to him. Ivan III also ordered the removal of the veche bell to Moscow, which signified the end of the republican government. After the takeover, Ivan took more than four-fifths of Novgorod's land: half for himself and the rest for his allies. The formal annexation of Novgorod marked a major step in the unification of Russia around Moscow; Ivan III later adopted the title of sovereign of all Russia.

The split between the pro-independence and pro-Muscovite factions contributed to the downfall of the republic. Some historians have emphasized a class divide, with the pro-independence faction dominated by boyars, and the merchants and commoners preferring Ivan III. The historian Vladimir Lukin has challenged this view, arguing that both factions were led by elites and that the split was "clannish and territorial" rather than social. Other reasons for the defeat of Novgorod include the political and military dominance of Moscow, the weakness of Novgorod's allies at the critical time, and inefficient military organisation.

In the decades after annexation, the city maintained its own distinct currency and local political life continued the traditions of the republic in many ways. The Novgorod Chronicle, which had been critical of Ivan III before the fall of the republic, described the conquest in its aftermath, justifying it on the grounds of purported conversion of Novgorodians to the Catholic faith:

Thus did Great Prince Ivan advance with all his host against his domain of Novgorod because of the rebellious spirit of its people, their pride and conversion to Latinism. With a great and overwhelming force did he occupy the entire territory of Novgorod from frontier to frontier, inflicting on every part of it the dread powers of his fire and sword.

== Government ==
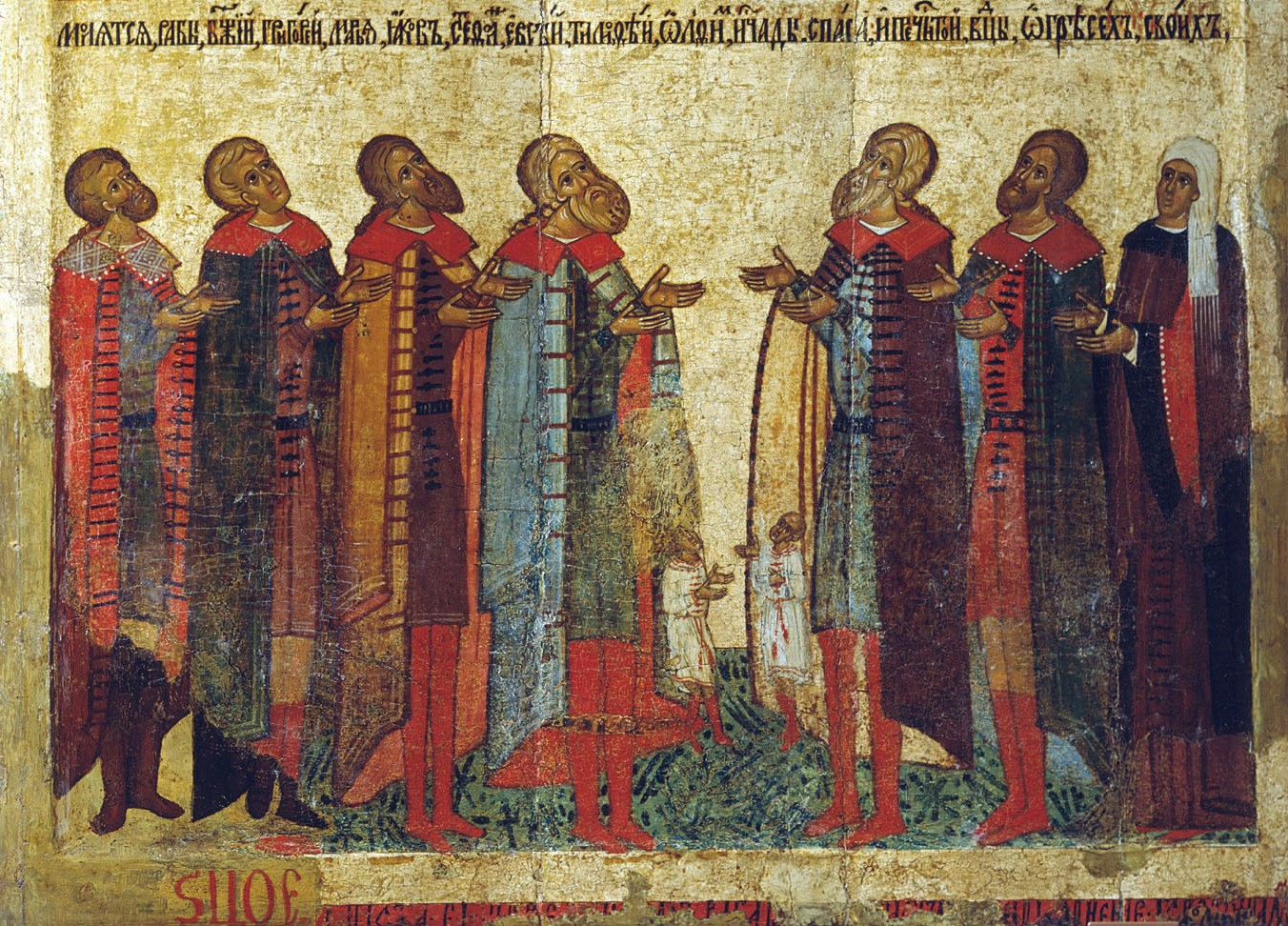
A fragment of the icon Praying Novgorodians depicting the Kuzmin boyars, 1467

The city-state of Novgorod had developed procedures of governance that held a large measure of democratic participation far in advance of the rest of Europe. The city concluded a contract with the prince, who promised to uphold the city's ancient traditions, and the practice of inviting and dismissing princes from other Russian principalities became firmly embedded by the 13th century. These agreements were formalized into charters (gramoty) that defined the scope of the prince's authority, transforming his position into that of a salaried official responsible for carrying out a defined set of duties.

From this point on, medieval Russia was a loose conglomerate of principalities—ruled by princes from the same dynasty—alongside two city-republics: Novgorod and Pskov. Novgorod recognized the nominal suzerainty of the Russian grand princes, but retained its autonomy. The Novgorodians, rather than the grand princes, determined the fate of the princely office, reflecting a broader transition from communal democracy to an aristocratic republic.

The constitutional structure of the medieval Novgorodian republic was never codified in any formal document other than the agreements with the princes. Despite this, traditional histories have created the image of a highly institutionalized network of veches (public assemblies) and a government of posadniki (burgomasters), tysyatskiye ('thousandmen'; originally the head of the town militia, but later a judicial and commercial official), other members of aristocratic families, and the archbishops of Novgorod. The veche, although dating to the early Kievan period, became a more structured institution, and it remained the center of Novgorod's political life. In theory, supreme power belonged to the veche. However, Novgorod's political order lacked a permanent character and was subject to change due to internal and external power struggles. The agreements with princes therefore served, to some extent, as temporary constitutions.

During the 13th and 14th centuries, the Russkaya Pravda was the basic source of written law in Novgorod. The Novgorod Judicial Charter is the most comprehensive legislative document produced in Novgorod. It is also considered a monument of medieval Russian law. This led to the judicial system achieving some stability in the 15th century, although this was short-lived. The latest version was supplemented in 1471 under the auspices of Ivan III and his son Ivan Ivanovich. The Novgorod Judicial Charter, along with the Pskov Judicial Charter, were later used for Ivan III's Sudebnik of 1497, which served as the legal code for the entire Russian state.

Soviet-era Marxist scholarship frequently described the political system of Novgorod as a "feudal republic", placing it within the Marxist historiographic periodization. Some historians have described Novgorod's political system as a democratic republic, as all free people in the city were able to participate in veche meetings. Other historians have instead described the political system as an oligarchy due to the dominance of rich merchant families in politics. Valentin Yanin, one of the leading specialists on the history of Novgorod, described its political system as a "boyar republic", citing the dominance of elites in the veche and other positions, especially after the 13th century. The strong class divide also undermined the democratic character of the government.

=== Archbishop ===
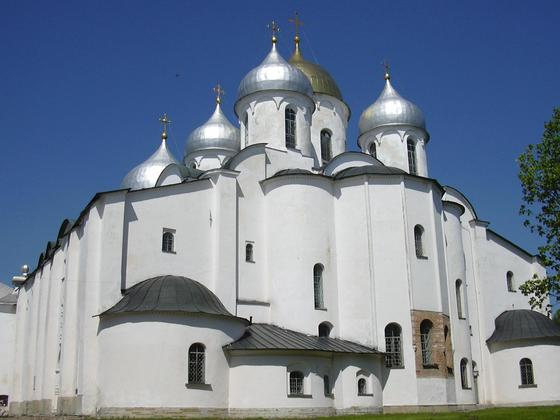
The Cathedral of St. Sophia, built in the 11th century

Some scholars argue that the archbishop was the head of the executive branch of the government, although it is difficult to determine the exact competence of the various officials. It is possible that there was a Council of Lords (Russian: Совет Господ) that was headed by the archbishop and met in the archiepiscopal palace (and in the Chamber of Facets after 1433). Within the Russian Church, the archbishop was the most senior prelate after the metropolitan and he supervised the largest diocese. Novgorod was also the only archbishopric until the late 14th century.

The executives of Novgorod, at least nominally, were always the princes of Novgorod, invited by Novgorodians from neighboring states, even though their power waned in the 13th and early 14th centuries. It is unclear if the archbishop of Novgorod was the true head of state or chief executive of the Novgorod Republic, but in any case, he remained an important town official. In addition to overseeing the church in Novgorod, he headed embassies, oversaw certain court cases of a secular nature, and carried out other secular tasks. However, the archbishops appear to have worked with the boyars to reach a consensus and almost never acted alone. The archbishop was not appointed, but elected by Novgorodians, and approved by the metropolitan of the Russian Orthodox Church. The archbishops were probably the richest single land-owners in Novgorod, and they also made money off court fees, fees for the use of weights and measures in the marketplace, and through other means.

=== Veche and posadnik ===
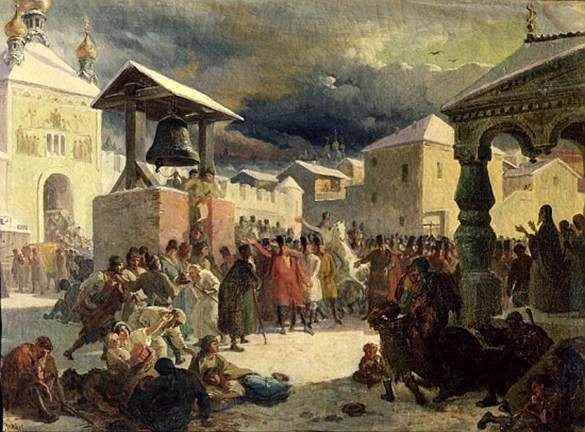
The Veche in the Republic of Novgorod, painting by Vasily Khudyakov, 1861

Another important executive was the posadnik of Novgorod, who chaired the veche, co-chaired courts together with the prince, oversaw tax collection and managed current affairs of the city. Most of the prince's major decisions had to be approved by the posadnik. In the mid-14th century, instead of one posadnik, the veche began electing six. These six posadniki kept their status for their lifetimes, and each year elected among themselves a stepennoy posadnik. Posadniki were almost invariably boyars – the city's highest aristocracy. The precise makeup of the veche is also uncertain, although it appears to have comprised members of the urban population, as well as of the free rural population. Whether it was a democratic institution or one controlled by the boyars has been hotly debated. The posadniki, tysyatskiye, and even the bishops and archbishops of Novgorod, (Note: Starting from 1156, elevated to archiepiscopal status in 1165.) were often elected or at least approved by the veche.

The veche tradition convinced Novgorodians that they had the right to be consulted on important issues, though in practice, the posadniki came from a few rich merchant families. In the early years of the republic, the prince and posadnik shared power until the prince's power was gradually restricted, while the archbishop of Novgorod increasingly played the role of head of state, particularly during times of feuds. Just before 1300, a series of reforms further curtailed the prince's powers within the local administration while those of the archbishop rose. The Council of Lords (Russian: Совет господ, romanized: Sovet gospod) was also formed, and boyar families from each district were represented, typically by former posadniki, with each posadnik beginning to hold office for only one year. As feuds continued to grow, the structure was again changed so that each district had its own posadnik, with the number of posadniki increasing to 24 in 1423, though this failed to achieve stability, and feuds continued until the last days of independence.

For most of the republic's history, the lowest free class had a right to take part in veche assemblies. The concept of the chyornye liudi, or chern, was broad, and so could be used to refer to free Novgorodians who did not belong to the nobility. Thus, the free townspeople (gorodovye liudi) consisted of several privileged groups, including boyars, clergymen, merchants, the chern, and so on. According to one estimate, no more than 5,000 to 6,000 men had the right to take part in veche assemblies by the 15th century, and this figure may be no more than 3,000 to 4,000 in earlier periods. Although there was no legal restriction on who could participate in veche assemblies, the rhetoric of fraternal unity only applied to free male citizens who resided in the city of Novgorod and the rural population were generally excluded from Novgorodian politics. (Note: The chronicles mention that representatives of the two most important suburbs, Pskov and Ladoga, took part in veche assembles in 1132 and 1136; however, there is no further evidence of the suburban population participating in veche assemblies.) The introductory clause of the Novgorod Judicial Charter, issued in the 15th century, reflects this:

This was decided by the burgomasters of Novgorod, and the thousandmen of Novgorod, and boyars, and zhitii liudi [a kind of Novgorodian middle class, literally 'well-to-do people'], and merchants, and chyornye liudi [literally, 'black people', 'black' being a word for low-class], all five kontsy [boroughs of Novgorod, literally 'ends'], all Sovereign Novgorod the Great at the veche at Yaroslav's court.

Tradespeople and craftsmen also participated in the political affairs of Novgorod. Traditional scholarship argues that they were organized into five kontsy ("ends" in Russian) – i.e., the boroughs of the city they lived in; each end was then organized by the streets in which they lived. The ends and streets often bore names indicating that certain trades were concentrated in certain parts of the city (there was a Carpenter's End and a Potters' End, for example). The merchants were organised into associations, of which the most famous were those of wax traders (called Ivan's Hundred) and of the merchants engaged in overseas trade. Guilds did not exist in Russian cities, and so Novgorod had neither a comprehensive merchant guild nor craft organizations.

Like much of the rest of Novgorod's medieval history, the precise composition of these organizations is uncertain. It is quite possible that the "ends" and "streets" were simply neighborhood administrative groups rather than guilds or "unions". Street organizations were known to build churches in their neighborhoods and to have buried the dead of their neighborhoods during outbreaks of the plague, but beyond that their activities are uncertain.

"Streets" and "ends" may have taken part in political decision-making in Novgorod in support of certain boyar factions or to protect their interests. Merchant representatives also participated in certain judicial proceedings and important disputes involving German merchants were to be heard in the presence of the posadnik, the tysyatsky, and the chiefs of Novgorod's merchant communities. About a hundred of these charters exist, a few of them date from the 12th century while most are from after 1262.

=== Prince ===
The prince, while his status in Novgorod was not inheritable and his power was much reduced, remained an important figure in Novgorodian life. Of around 100 princes of Novgorod, many, if not most, were invited in or dismissed by the Novgorodians. At least some of them signed a contract called a ryad (Russian: ряд), which protected the interests of Novgorodian boyars and laid out the prince's rights and responsibilities. The ryads that have been preserved in archives describe the relationship of Novgorod with twelve invited princes: five of them from Tver, four from Moscow, and three from Lithuania. From the mid-13th century, only the grand prince of Vladimir (later the grand prince of Moscow) held the Novgorodian throne. Although a number of Lithuanian princes were invited, they did not occupy the throne; instead, they were given certain territories.

First and foremost among the prince's functions, he was a military leader. He also patronized churches in the city and held court, although it was often presided over by his namestnik or lieutenant when he was personally absent from the city. The posadnik had always to be present in the court and no court decision could be made without his approval. Also, without the approval of the posadnik, the prince could neither give out Novgorod lands nor issue laws. Besides, the prince could not own land in Novgorod and could not himself collect taxes from the territory of Novgorod. He lived from money given to him by the city. By the end of the 13th century, the authority of the prince was greatly weakened in favor of republican legal proceedings. As a result, the suzerainty of the grand prince was only nominal.

According to several ryads, the prince could not extradite or prosecute a Novgorodian outside of Novgorod Land. The princes had two residences, one on the Marketplace (called Yaroslav's Court), and another in Ryurikovo Gorodishche several miles south of the Trade Side of the city.

=== Administrative divisions ===
The administrative division of Novgorod Republic is not definitely known; it was divided into several tysyachi (Russian: тысячи, lit. 'thousands') in the core lands of the country, and volosti (Russian: волости) in lands in the east and north that were being colonized or just paid tribute. The most important volost was the Dvina Land, which was administered by a namestnik appointed by Novgorod.

The city of Novgorod and its vicinity, as well as a few other towns, were not part of any of those. The metropolitan area was surrounded by five "fifths" (pyatiny) adjoining or almost adjoining the territory of the city. Pskov achieved autonomy from Novgorod in the 13th century; its independence was confirmed by the Treaty of Bolotovo, traditionally dated to 1348. Several other towns had special status as they were owned jointly by Novgorod and one of the neighbouring states.

== Geography ==
The Novgorod Republic was the largest of the Russian states in terms of area until it was surpassed by Moscow following its annexation of other independent principalities in the 15th century. The Novgorod Republic occupied the northwest and north of European Russia, as well as the eastern part of Finland. To the east, it was bordered by the Principality of Tver and to the west, it was bordered by Lithuania as well as various Baltic powers, including the Teutonic Order and the bishoprics of Dorpat and Courland as well as the Hanseatic cities of Riga and Reval.

Aside from the city of Novgorod, the largest settlements were Ladoga, Pskov, Rusa, Korela, Koporye, Oreshek, Porkhov, and Yam.

== Economy ==
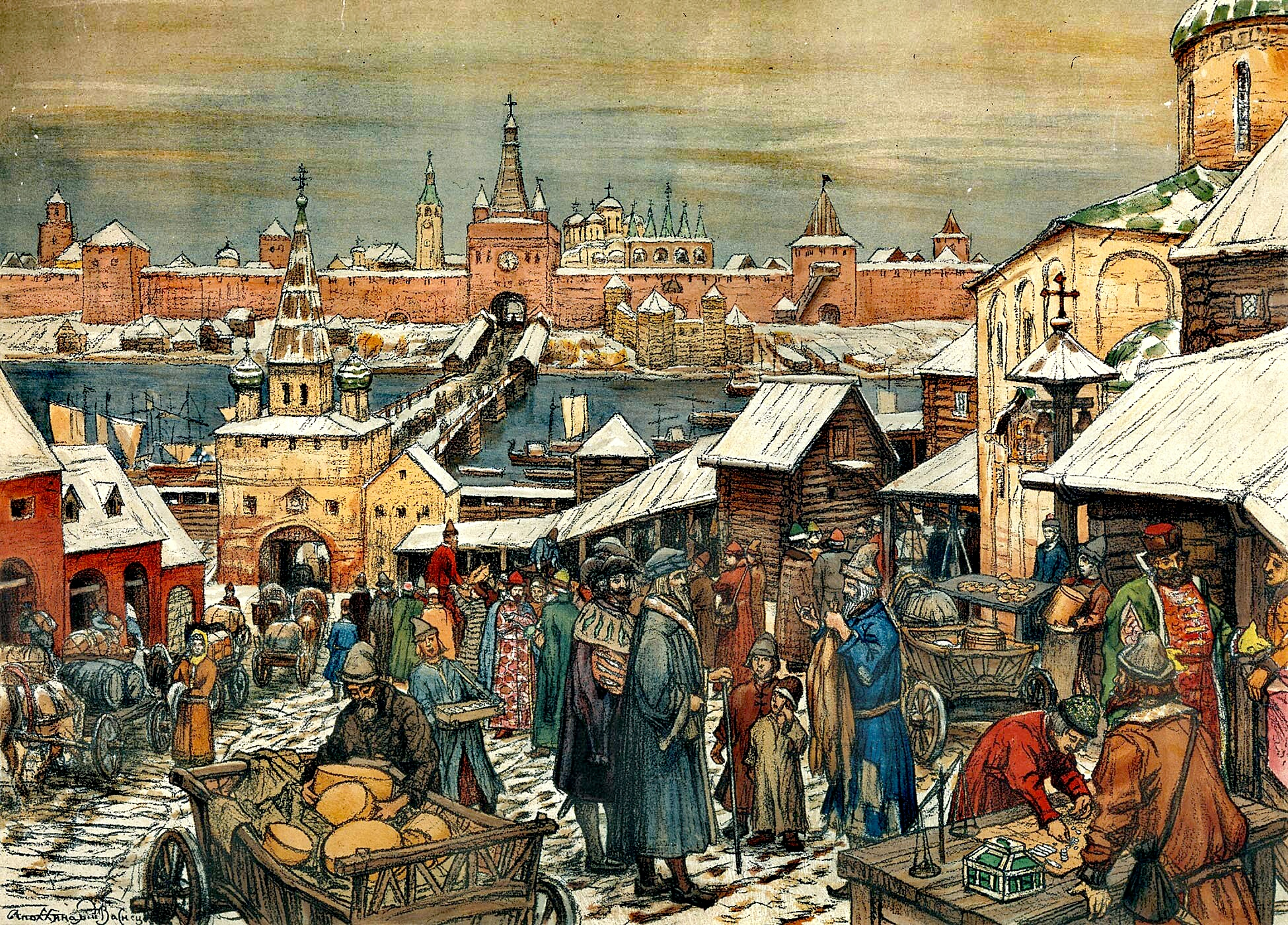
The marketplace in Novgorod, painting by Apollinary Vasnetsov, 1908–1909

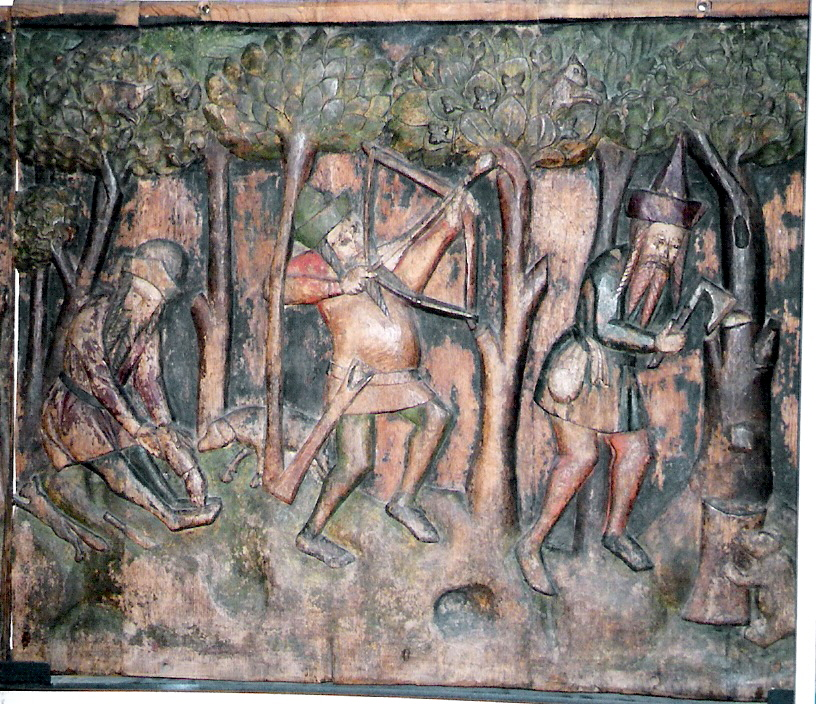
Hunting and beekeeping in the forests of Novgorod, 1360

The economy of the Novgorod Republic included farming and animal husbandry (e.g., the archbishops of Novgorod and others raised horses for the Novgorodian army), while hunting, beekeeping, and fishing were also widespread. In most of the regions of the republic, these different "industries" were combined with farming. Iron was mined on the coast of the Gulf of Finland. Staraya Russa and other localities were known for their saltworks. Flax and hop cultivation were also of significant importance. Countryside products, such as furs, beeswax, honey, fish, lard, flax, and hops, were sold on the market and exported to other Russian cities or abroad. Scholars have argued that Novgorod played a crucial role in revitalizing the Russian economy in the 14th century, especially by importing silver from the rest of Europe.

The real wealth of Novgorod came from the fur trade. Hanseatic merchants were particularly attracted to the Russian trade due to its vast resources of furs and beeswax, with Novgorod being the leading supplier of furs. As one of the westernmost Russian cities, Novgorod was the main entrepôt for trade between Rus' and northwestern Europe as it was located at the eastern end of the Baltic trade network established by the Hanseatic League. From Novgorod's northeastern lands ("The Lands Beyond the Portages", as they were called in the chronicles), the area stretching north of Lakes Ladoga and Onega, and extending up to the White Sea and east to the Ural Mountains, had so much fur that medieval travel accounts tell of furry animals raining from the sky.

The Novgorodian merchants traded with Swedish, German, and Danish cities. In early years, the Novgorodians sailed the Baltic themselves (several incidents involving Novgorodian merchants in Gotland and Denmark are reported in the Novgorodian First Chronicle). Orthodox churches for Novgorodian merchants have been excavated on Gotland. Likewise, merchants from Gotland had their own St. Olaf church and trading house in Novgorod. However, the Hanseatic League disputed the right of Novgorodian merchants to carry out sea trade independently and to deliver cargoes to Western European ports by their own ships. Silver, cloth, wine and herring were imported from Western Europe.

The amount of fur, especially squirrel and other relatively cheap furs, that Novgorod supplied to Hanseatic merchants was considerable. The Lübeck company of Wittenborg exported between 200,000 and 500,000 Lübeck marks from Novgorod to Livonia in the 1350s. Anna Khoroshkevich assumed that exports increased throughout the 14th century and was at its height in the beginning of the 15th century, but by the second half of the century, Novgorod suffered from the effects of exhaustion of its resources with hunting grounds moving considerably further north and Muscovite merchants accruing the main profit of the shift.

In spite of unfavorable natural conditions, Novgorod's rural population was dependent upon agriculture and stock-rearing, while hunting and fishing were also important. The agricultural basis was also insecure, as the land passed almost fully into the hands of ruling boyars and clergy, with only a small area belonging to merchants. The peasants of Novgorod also paid dues to their lords in the products of agriculture, fishing, forestry, and stock-rearing.

Foreign coins and silver were used as a currency before Novgorod started minting its own novgorodka coins in 1420, also known as the Novgorodian denga. The Hanseatic kontor in Novgorod, called the Peterhof, was dominated by Lübeck until the 15th century, when it was replaced by the Livonian cities. The kontor remained open until it was finally closed in 1494 by Ivan III. It was an attempt to reduce Hanseatic influence on Russian trade, as Ivan sought to open as many outlets for foreign trade as possible, which included his fortress of Ivangorod in the Baltic. Although the kontor was briefly re-opened in 1514, the Hanseatic League never regained its former monopoly.

== Society ==
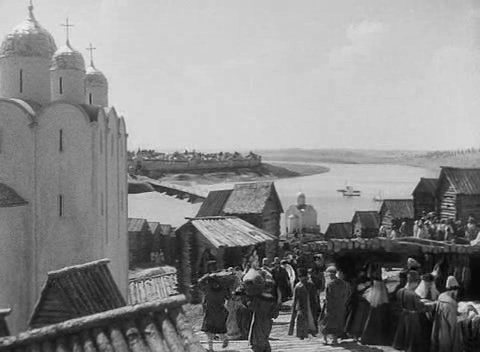
13th-century Novgorod as depicted in Sergei Eisenstein's Alexander Nevsky (1938)

The free population of Novgorod consisted of nobles known as boyars, the zhityi lyudi ("well-to-do people"), and the chyornye lyudi or chern ("black people"). In official documents, such as treaties, these people are mentioned separately. The boyars stood at the top, while the rest of the population were divided into "greater" and "lesser" people. A merchant (kupets) could be found in different groups as the merchants did not constitute a social class, but they did constitute a special category of people with their own social hierarchy. The clergy, priests, monks and nuns also constituted a special category of people, with the archbishop at the top, followed by the archimandrite and then other abbots and lower clergy. The vast majority of the rural population consisted of free peasants, while the rest consisted of peasants with a different status, clergy, merchants, craftsmen, soldiers, and so on.

The boyars and merchants were perceived as distinct categories of people due to the role they played in Novgorod's politics and economy. It is unknown what exactly made someone a boyar, aside from having a father who was one. Although all free citizens could participate in veche meetings, which usually elected the posadniki and tysyatskiye, such procedures almost always led to the appointment of individuals from the boyar class. This suggests that the custom was to limit appointments to that class or that the boyars held significant influence in the veche and could thus ensure that one of their own was elected. Traditional Soviet scholarship viewed the boyars as the ruling class of a feudal society, and so boyar land ownership was seen as constituting the foundation of their position. The historian Valentin Yanin concluded that the boyar class was a closed group of families descended from a small number of ancestors.

Novgorodians who enjoyed full rights constituted the city's kontsy (lit. 'ends'), which served as both local administrative divisions and communities. The established view is that there were originally three kontsy. Historians generally believe that the city of Novgorod developed from three villages, according to the hypothesis of Valentin Yanin. In the 12th and 13th centuries, two more kontsy appeared, and in total, there were five kontsy until the end of Novgorod's independence. As a result, Novgorodian townsmen may be viewed as belonging primarily to the kontsy. Those who enjoyed full rights may be compared to "free citizens", "full members", or simply "the people" of Western European communes. Although they may be referred to as "brothers", a well-defined social hierarchy existed. (Note: The chronicles mention that Novgorodians referred to each other as "brothers", and evidence of this can be found in letters written by Hanseatic merchants dating to the 14th and 15th centuries. The term was also used in reference to people from other Russian polities. For example, the residents of Pskov were considered to be their "younger brothers".)

More than half of all privately owned lands in Novgorod had been concentrated in the hands of some 30–40 noble boyar families by the 14th and 15th centuries. These vast estates served as material resources, which secured political supremacy of the boyars. The Cathedral of St. Sophia – the main ecclesiastic establishment of Novgorod – was their chief rival in terms of landownership. Its votchiny were located in the most economically developed regions of Novgorod Land. The Yuriev Monastery, Arkazhsky Monastery, Antoniev Monastery and some other privileged monasteries are known to have been big landowners. There were also the zhityi lyudi (Russian: житьи люди), who owned less land than the boyars, and unprivileged small votchina owners called svoyezemtsy (своеземцы, or private landowners). The most common form of labor exploitation – the system of metayage – was typical for the aforementioned categories of landowners. Their household economies were mostly serviced by slaves (kholops), whose number had been constantly decreasing. Along with the metayage, monetary payments also gained significant importance by the second half of the 15th century.

Some scholars argue that the feudal lords tried to legally tie down the peasants to their land. Certain categories of feudally dependent peasants, such as davniye lyudi (давние люди), polovniki (половники), poruchniki (поручники), and dolzhniki (должники), were deprived of the right to leave their masters. The boyars and monasteries also tried to restrict other categories of peasants from switching their feudal lords. However, until the late 16th century peasants could leave their land in the weeks preceding and coming after George's Day in Autumn. Marxist scholars such as Aleksandr Khoroshev often spoke of a class struggle in Novgorod. There were some 80 major uprisings in the republic, which often turned into armed rebellions. The most notable among these took place in 1136, 1207, 1228–1229, 1270, 1418, and 1446–1447. The extent to which these were based on "class struggle" is unclear. Many were between various boyar factions.

Novgorod's merchants were also a well-defined group and organized into several guilds. There was also a separate group of important merchants, or poshlye kuptsy. For instance, the guild of St. John, which united the merchants engaged in domestic Russian trade, had privileged members who paid a high entrance fee of 50 silver grivny, and this allowed them and their successors to have hereditary membership. The two elders of the guild were also chosen from this group. A guild's income came from entrance fees and trade taxes.

== Religion ==
Throughout the republican period, the archbishop of Novgorod oversaw the diocese of Novgorod within the Russian Orthodox Church. Following the death of Metropolitan Alexius in 1378, the Russian Church experienced a period of ecclesiastical turmoil involving competing claims to the metropolitanate. Archbishop Alexius of Novgorod, who had been loyal to Metropolitan Alexius, initially refused to accept Metropolitan Cyprian, and the struggle for an independent ecclesiastical court continued under his successor Ioann. (Note: The Novgorod First Chronicle has the following entry under the year 1376: "that winter Metropolitan Kiprian sent his envoys from Lithuania bringing with them patriarchal decrees (patriarshi gramoty) to the archbishop in Novgorod saying: 'Patriarch Filofey [Philotheus] has blessed me as metropolitan for all the Russian land.' And Novgorod, having heard the decree, answered them: 'Send to the grand prince; if the grand prince receives you as metropolitan of all the Russian land, then for us you are metropolitan...' And hearing Novgorod's answer, Metropolitan Kiprian did not send to Moscow to the grand prince.")

In 1385, the Novgorodians refused to recognize the appellate jurisdiction of the metropolitan, establishing an independent ecclesiastical court as the highest ecclesiastical judicial authority. This initially went unnoticed by the hierarchy of the Russian Church, allowing Novgorod to withdraw from the judicial authority of the metropolitan. Metropolitan Pimen, who bore the title of metropolitan of Great Russia, had left for Constantinople and was soon followed by Metropolitan Cyprian. Neither would return for another three years. In 1389, Patriarch Antony IV of Constantinople decreed that Cyprian was "the one and only metropolitan of Russia". In 1393, the Novgorodians again swore an oath to the metropolitan, but in 1395, they refused to recognize his judicial authority during his visit to the city. The dispute was finally resolved in 1396, when Archbishop Ioann visited Metropolitan Cyprian in Moscow and acknowledged his authority.

The establishment of a diocese in Perm under Metropolitan Pimen during the winter of 1383–1384 led to conflict between the Novgorodians and both the metropolitanate and the newly established diocese. Archbishop Alexius of Novgorod opposed its establishment within Novgorod's sphere of influence and sent his forces against the diocese. The conflict may also have been influenced by Novgorod's position in the ecclesiastical turmoil, as the Novgorodians probably regarded Cyprian, rather than Pimen, as the legitimate metropolitan. Stephen of Perm, who had been consecrated as its first bishop, personally visited Novgorod in 1386 and concluded a peace agreement with Archbishop Alexius, bringing an end to Novgorod's claims against the newly established diocese.

The sect of the strigolniki spread to Novgorod from Pskov in the middle of the 14th century, with its members renouncing ecclesiastic hierarchy, monasticism and sacraments of priesthood, communion, repentance and baptism, before they disappeared by the early 15th century. In 1382, Archbishop Dionysius of Suzdal won recognition from Patriarch Nilus of Constantinople for his efforts to combat the strigolniki in the city. Another sect, known as the Judaizers by its opponents, appeared in Novgorod in the second half of the 15th century and subsequently enjoyed support at the court in Moscow, before ultimately they were persecuted and several councils of the Russian Church condemned them.

== Military ==
Like other Russian states, the military of Novgorod consisted of a levy and the prince's retinue (druzhina). While potentially all free Novgorodians could be mobilised, in reality the number of recruits depended on the level of danger faced by Novgorod. The professional formations included the retinues of the archbishop and prominent boyars, as well as the garrisons of fortresses. Firearms were first mentioned in 1394, and in the 15th century, fortress artillery was used, and cannons were installed on ships.

== Foreign relations ==
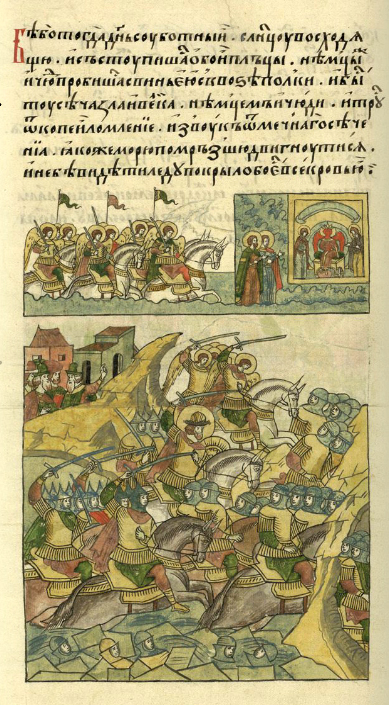
The Battle on the Ice against the Livonian Order, miniature from the Life of Alexander Nevsky (16th century)

During the era of Kievan Rus', Novgorod was a trade hub at the northern end of both the Volga trade route and the route from the Varangians to the Greeks along the Dnieper River system. A vast array of goods were transported along these routes and exchanged with local Novgorod merchants and other traders. The merchants of Gotland retained the Gothic Court trading house well into the 12th century. Later, German merchantmen also established trading houses in Novgorod. Scandinavian royalty would intermarry with Russian princes and princesses.

=== Livonian Order and Sweden ===
After the East–West Schism, Novgorod struggled from the beginning of the 13th century against Swedish, Danish, and German crusaders. During the Swedish–Novgorodian Wars, the Swedes invaded lands where some of the population had earlier paid tribute to Novgorod. The Germans had been trying to conquer the Baltic region since the late 12th century. Novgorod went to war 26 times with Sweden and 11 times with the Livonian Brothers of the Sword. The German knights, along with Danish and Swedish feudal lords, launched a series of uncoordinated attacks in 1240–1242. Russian sources mention that a Swedish army was defeated in the Battle of the Neva in 1240. The Baltic German campaigns ended in failure after the Battle on the Ice in 1242. After the foundation of the castle of Vyborg in 1293 the Swedes gained a foothold in Karelia. On 12 August 1323, Sweden and Novgorod signed the Treaty of Nöteborg, regulating their border for the first time.

=== Golden Horde ===
The Novgorod Republic was saved from the direct impact of the Mongol invasions as it was not conquered by the Mongols. In 1259, Mongol tax-collectors and census-takers arrived in the city, leading to political disturbances and forcing Alexander Nevsky to punish a number of town officials (by cutting off their noses) for defying him as the grand prince of Vladimir (soon to be the khan's tax-collector in Russia) and his Mongol overlords.

== Culture ==
=== Art and iconography ===
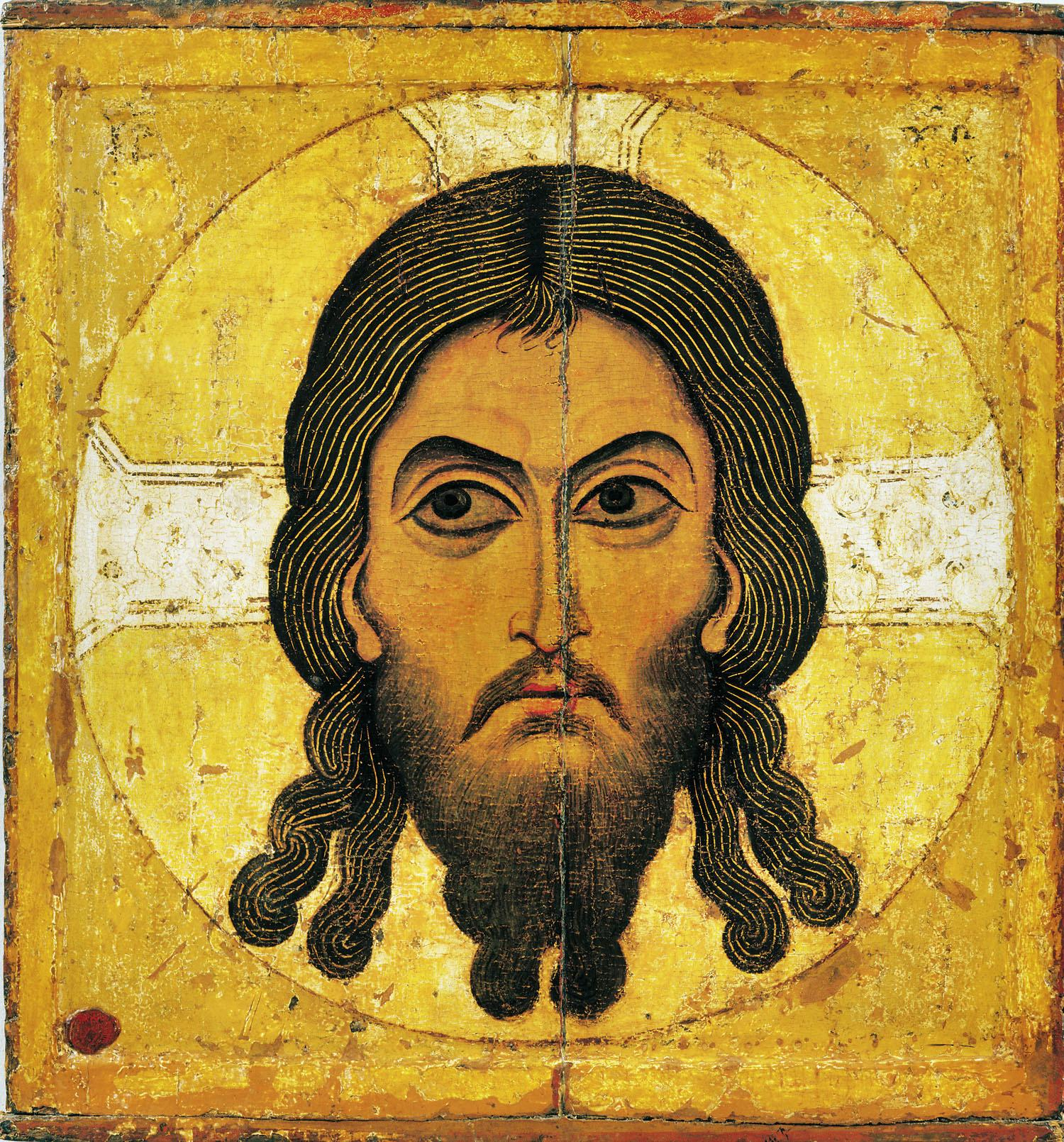
The Saviour Not Made by Hands, an icon of the Novgorod school, c. 1100

The Novgorod Republic was famous for its high level of culture compared to the rest of Russia, particularly in relation to its icons, which were produced prolifically. As the wealthiest center, the city used its wealth to paint hundreds of icons, making it the cultural center of Russia for much of its history. Not only would prominent boyar families commission the creation of icons, but artists also had the backing of wealthy merchants and members of the strong artisan class. Icons became so prominent in Novgorod that by the end of the 13th century, a citizen did not have to be particularly rich to buy one; in fact, icons were often produced as exports as well as for churches and homes. However, scholars today have managed to find and preserve only a small, random assortment of icons made from the 12th century to the 14th century in Novgorod.

The icons that do remain show a mixture of a traditional Russian style, Palaeologus-Byzantine style (prominent previously in Kiev), and European Romanesque and Gothic style. The artists of Novgorod, and their audience, favored saints who provided protection mostly related to the economy. The Prophet Elijah was the lord of thunder who provided rain for the peasants' fields. Saint George, Saint Blaise, and Saints Florus and Laurus all provided some manner of protection over the fields or the animals and herds of the peasants. Saint Paraskeva Pyatnitsa and Saint Anastasia both protected trade and merchants. Saint Nicholas was the patron of carpenters and protected travelers and the suffering. Both Saint Nicholas and the Prophet Elijah also offer protection from fires. Fires were commonplace in the fields and on the streets of the city. Depictions of these saints retained popularity throughout the entire reign of the republic. But in the beginning of the 14th century another icon became prominent in the city: the Virgin of Mercy. This icon commemorates the appearance of the Virgin Mary to Andrew the Fool. During this appearance, Mary prays for humankind.

Novgorod lost not only its political authority after 1478 but also its artistic authority, resulting in a more uniform method for iconography being established throughout Russia. The Novgorod school continued to develop under the influence of the Moscow school until the 16th century.

=== Architecture and city layout ===
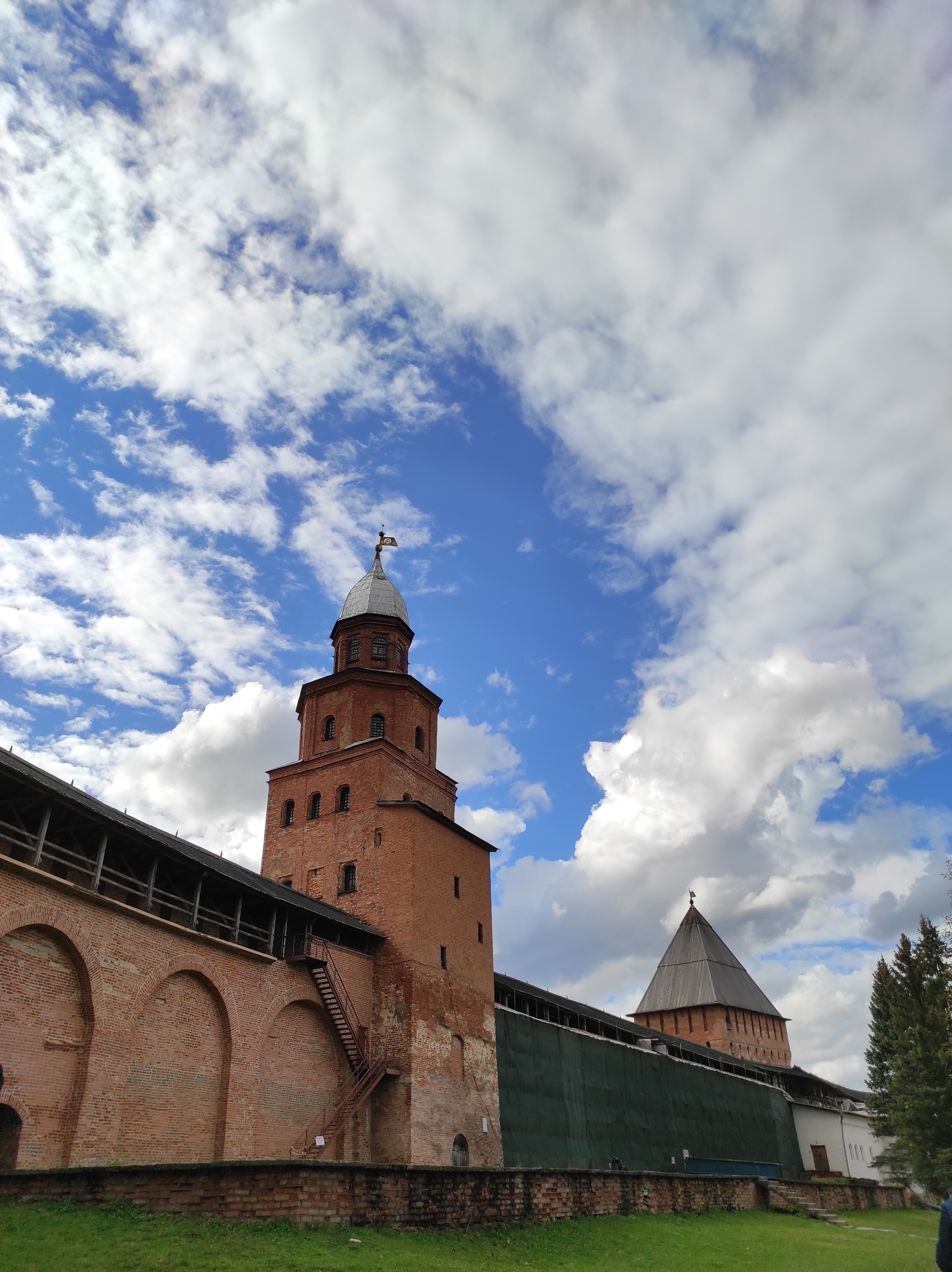
Medieval walls of the Novgorod Detinets from the late 15th century. The Kokui tower (left) dates from the 17th century

The Volkhov River divided the Novgorod Republic into two-halves. The commercial side of the city, which contained the main market, rested on one side of the Volkhov. The Cathedral of St. Sophia and the ancient Kremlin rested on the other side of the river. The cathedral and Kremlin were surrounded by a solid ring of city walls, which included a bell tower. Novgorod was filled with and surrounded by churches and monasteries. The city was overcrowded because of its large population of 30,000 people. The wealthy (boyar families, artisans, and merchants) lived in large houses inside the city walls, and the poor used whatever space they could find. The streets were paved with wood and were accompanied by a wooden water-pipe system, a Byzantine invention to protect against fire.

The Byzantine style (famous for large domes) and the European Romanesque style influenced the architecture of Novgorod. A number of rich families commissioned churches and monasteries in the city. About 83 churches, almost all of which were built in stone, operated during this period. Two prominent styles of churches existed in the Republic of Novgorod. The first style consisted of a single apse with a slanted (lopastnyi) roof. This style was standard throughout Russia during this period. The second style, the Novgorodian style, consisted of three apses and had roofs with arched gables. This second style was prominent in the early years of the Republic of Novgorod and also in the last years of the Republic, when this style was revitalized to make a statement against the rising power of Moscow. The inside of the churches contained icons, woodcarvings, and church plates. The first known one-day votive church was built in Novgorod in 1390 to ward off a pandemic, several others were built in the city until the mid-16th century. As they were built in one day, they were made of wood, small in size and simple in design.

=== Literature and literacy ===
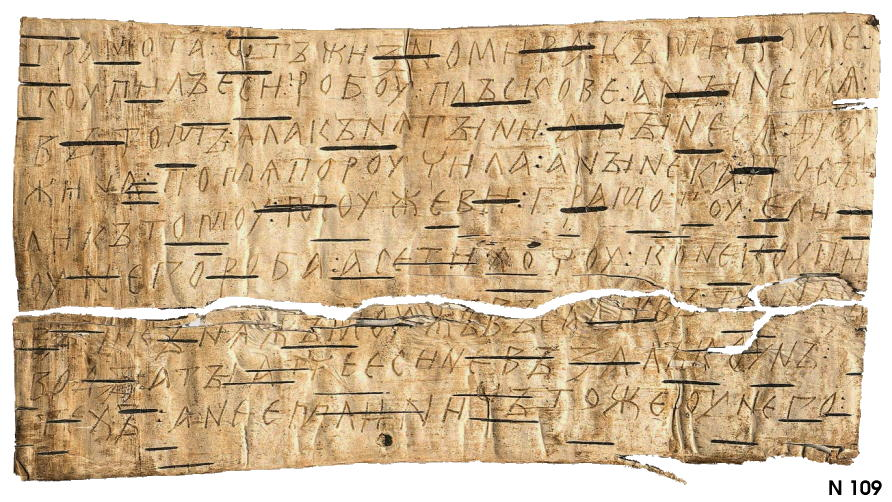
Many birch-bark documents have been found in Novgorod attesting to a high level of literacy among Novgorodians of different social classes

Chronicles are the earliest kind of literature known to originate in Novgorod, the oldest one being the Novgorod First Chronicle. Other genres appear in the 14th and 15th centuries: travel diaries (such as the account of Stephen of Novgorod's travel to Constantinople), legends about local posadniki, saints and Novgorod's wars and victories. The events of many byliny – traditional Russian oral epic poems – take place in Novgorod. Their protagonists include a merchant and adventurer Sadko and daredevil Vasily Buslayev.

Over one thousand birch bark manuscripts have been discovered in the city of Novgorod during archaeological excavations since the 1950s. Archeologists and scholars estimate that as much as 20,000 similar texts still remain in the ground and many more burned down during numerous fires. As the manuscripts were written by laypeople in the vernacular language and consist of casual notes, it has been suggested that there was widespread literacy across large segments of urban society in medieval Russia; according to one estimate, 20% of the urban male population in Russian city-states were literate around the mid-13th century. Among the most notable manuscripts discovered were those written by a boy called Onfim, who lived in Novgorod in the 13th century.

Novgorodian citizens from all class levels, from boyars to peasants and artisans to merchants, participated in writing these texts. Even women wrote a significant amount of the manuscripts. This collection of birch-bark texts consists of religious documents, writings from the city's archbishops, business messages from all classes, and travelogues, especially of religious pilgrimages. The citizens of Novgorod wrote in a realistic and businesslike fashion. In addition to the birch-bark texts, archeologists also found the oldest surviving Russian manuscript in Novgorod: three wax tablets with Psalms 67, 75, and 76, dating from the first quarter of the 11th century. The spread of literacy in Novgorod coincided with its rise as a power and the expansion of its hinterland. The decline in birch bark writing after the 15th century can be explained by the decrease in the city's political importance, the introduction of paper, as well as the creation of a sewer system in the 17th–18th centuries, which caused all organic layers in the city from the 16th century onward to decay.

Old Novgorodian, a historical variety of Russian, was spoken and used in some literary texts. Michael Clanchy draws a distinction between Novgorod and Western Europe, where administrative literacy was promoted by the state: "In the Russian lands written forms of the vernacular were used by both clergy and laity and the emphasis on the agency of central government (as in Anglo-Norman England) was much less". Church Slavonic was restricted to religious texts, although the language could be found in certain secular texts, for example in birch bark manuscripts written by monks.

== See also ==
- List of wars involving the Novgorod Republic
