= Novgorod veche =

Government body of the Novgorod Republic

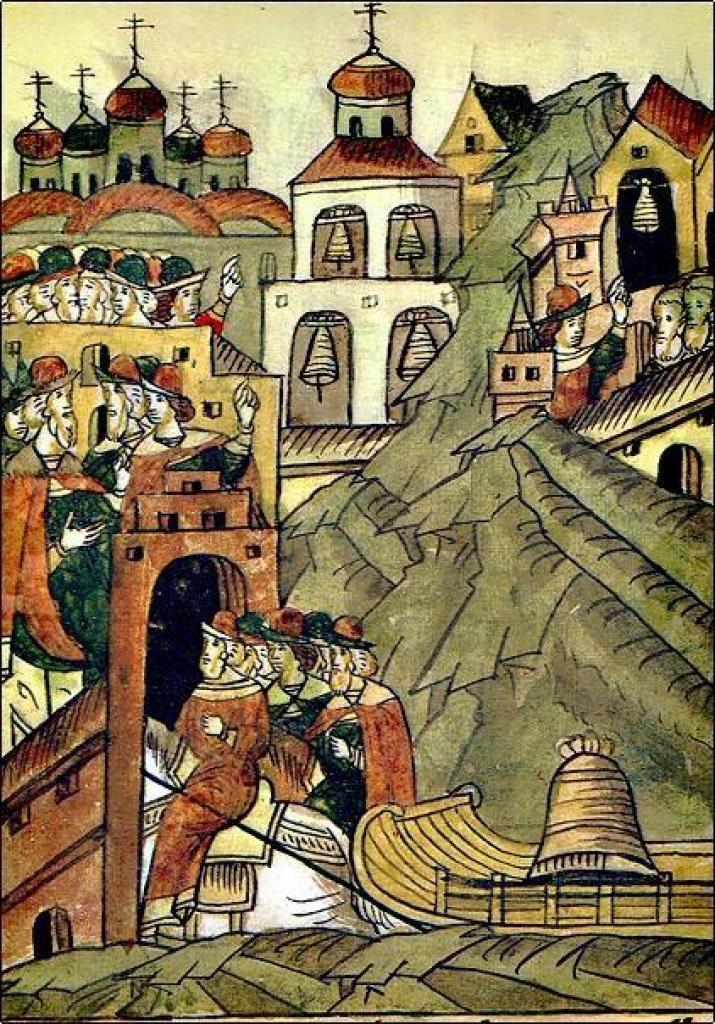
The removal of the veche bell from Novgorod (from the Illustrated Chronicle of Ivan the Terrible)

According to the traditional scholarship, the veche (Russian: вече, IPA: [ˈvʲetɕə]) was the highest legislative and judicial authority in Veliky Novgorod until 1478, when the Novgorod Republic was brought under the direct control of the Grand Duke of Moscow, Ivan III.

The origin of the veche is obscure; it is thought to have originated in tribal assemblies in the region, thus predating the Rus' state. After the Novgorod Revolution of 1136 that ousted the ruling prince, the veche became the supreme state authority, although princely power was relatively limited in Novgorod from the start since no hereditary dynasty had been established there.

The traditional scholarship lists among the powers of the veche the election of the town officials such as the posadnik, tysyatsky, and even the archbishop (he was then sent to the metropolitan for consecration); it also invited in and dismissed the princes. While it is certainly true that the local officials were elected and some princes elected and dismissed, the sources are rather vague on precisely who was behind some of this, saying merely "they called in..." or "they gave the posadnikship to..." and the like.

The traditional scholarship goes on to argue that a series of reforms in 1410 transformed the veche into something similar to the public assembly of Venice; it became the Commons or lower chamber of the parliament. An upper Senate-like Council of Lords (sovet gospod) was also created, with title membership for all former city magistrates (posadniks and tysyatskys). Some sources indicate that veche membership may have become full-time, and parliament deputies were now called vechniks.

The veche was abolished after the fall of Novgorod to the Muscovites in 1478; however, there is some evidence that certain elements of the Novgorodian veche democracy have been restored under Swedish occupation during the Ingrian war of 1610–1617: one Swedish source indicates that Jacob de la Gardie has been present at thing in Novgorod.

== Conflicting interpretations ==
Some of the more recent scholars call this interpretation into question. The difficulty in understanding the veche is that the term was used to mean any sort of assemblage of people, from a formal legislature or judicial entity to a mob or riot. Valentin Yanin's scholarship calls into question the democratic nature of the veche; he argues that the boyars ran the city and the veche was a "sham democracy" that allowed the common people a sense that they were participating in decision-making when decisions had, in fact, already been decided by the Council of Lords made up of the boyars and the archbishop.

Add to this the fact that Novgorod had a series of judicial entities: the prince's court, the archbishop's court, and the tysyatsky's court, and it is difficult to say where the veche fit in as a judicial body. Several "executions" in the veche seem to be the result of mob violence rather than the carrying out of judicial sentences. Jonas Granberg has called into question the very existence of the Council of Lords (sovet gospod), saying it is an interpolation or interpretation of modern historians of very scanty evidence. Michael C. Paul has argued that the veche, at least in the thirteenth century, was used as a consensus-building tool rather than becoming a formally institutionalized parliament.

== Procedure ==
The Novgorod assembly could be presumably summoned by anyone who rang the veche bell, although it is more likely that the common procedure was more complex. This bell was a symbol of republican sovereignty and independence and for this reason, Ivan III carted it off to Moscow when he took control of the city, to show that the old way of doing things was at an end. The whole population of the city - boyars, merchants, and common citizens - then gathered at Yaroslav's Court or in front of the Cathedral of Holy Wisdom (the latter called a Vladychnoe veche - "An Archbishop's Veche," since it was called in front of the cathedral). Separate assemblies could be held in the boroughs or "Ends" of Novgorod.
