= Posadnik =

Mayor in Novgorod and Pskov

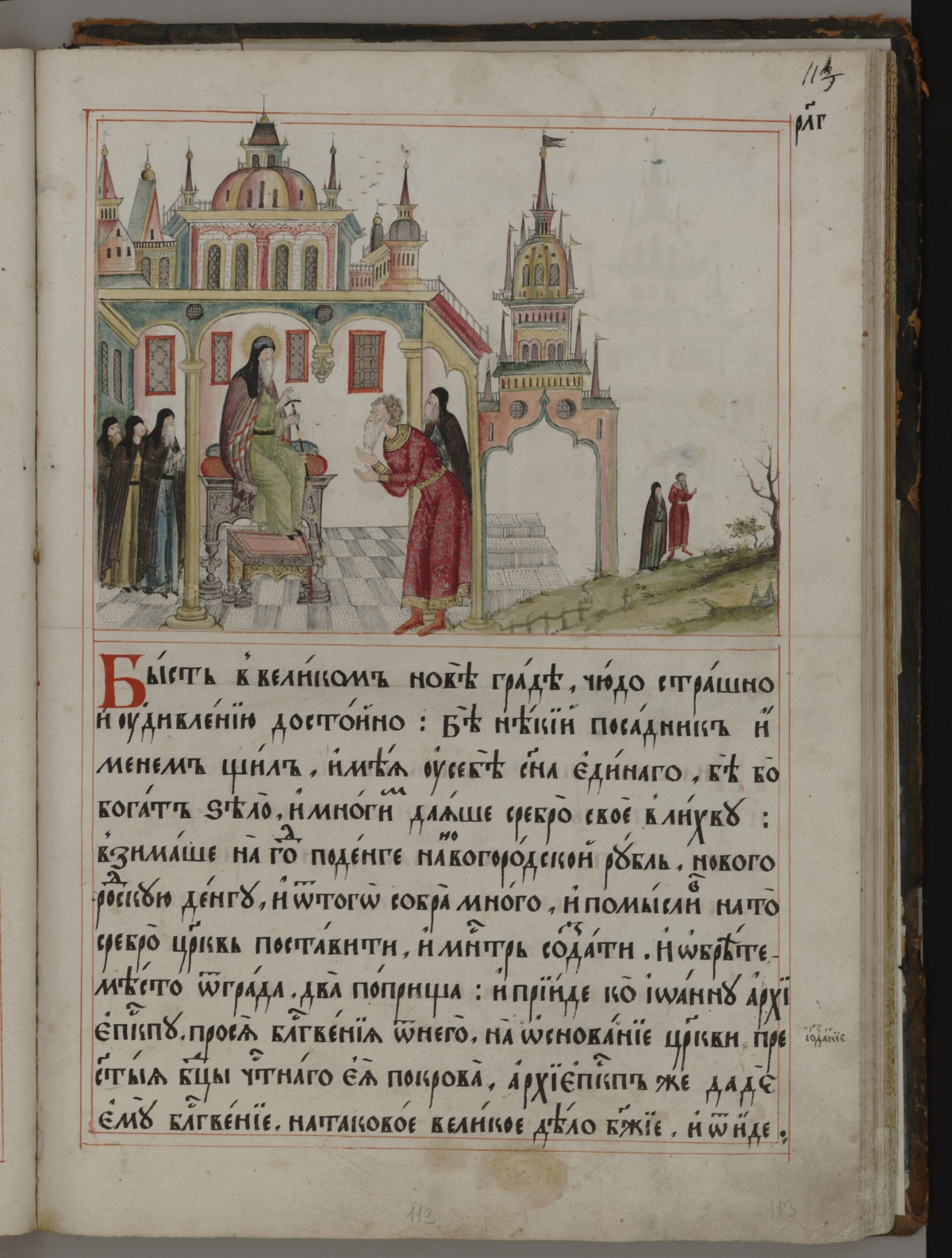
Posadnik Shchil asks for the blessing of Archbishop John to build a church. The Tale of Posadnik Shchil.

A posadnik (Russian: посадник, pl. посадники, posadniki) was originally a representative of the ruling prince in some towns during the times of Kievan Rus'. Following its disintegration, the posadnik became the highest-ranking official in the Russian cities of Novgorod (from 1136) and Pskov (from 1308). The title is often translated as "mayor", but "lieutenant" and "governor" can also sometimes be found.

In the early 12th century, Novgorod won the right to elect its own posadnik, who was originally appointed by the prince to rule on his behalf during his absence, thus the posadnik became the elected burgomaster. In 1136, the prince Vsevolod was expelled and the Novgorod veche (popular assembly) began to appoint and expel princes at its own will. The posadnik was so much of an official that the representative of the prince became known as the namestnik.

== Etymology ==
The term posadnik appears to be derived from the early process of princely representation, when the prince placed (posadi) his men in towns such as Novgorod.

== History ==
The city-states of Novgorod and Pskov had a prince who was the head of state, although they can be considered to be republics in some sense. In the other Russian principalities, sovereignty belonged to the prince; however, in Novgorod and Pskov, sovereignty was shared between the prince and local authorities, including the veche (popular assembly), posadnik (mayor), and other officials. Eventually, the power of the prince was diminished. The prince could also be dismissed, but not dispensed. The tysyatsky, who was originally the commander of the urban militia, also began to take on judicial responsibilities in Novgorod and Pskov.

=== Novgorod ===
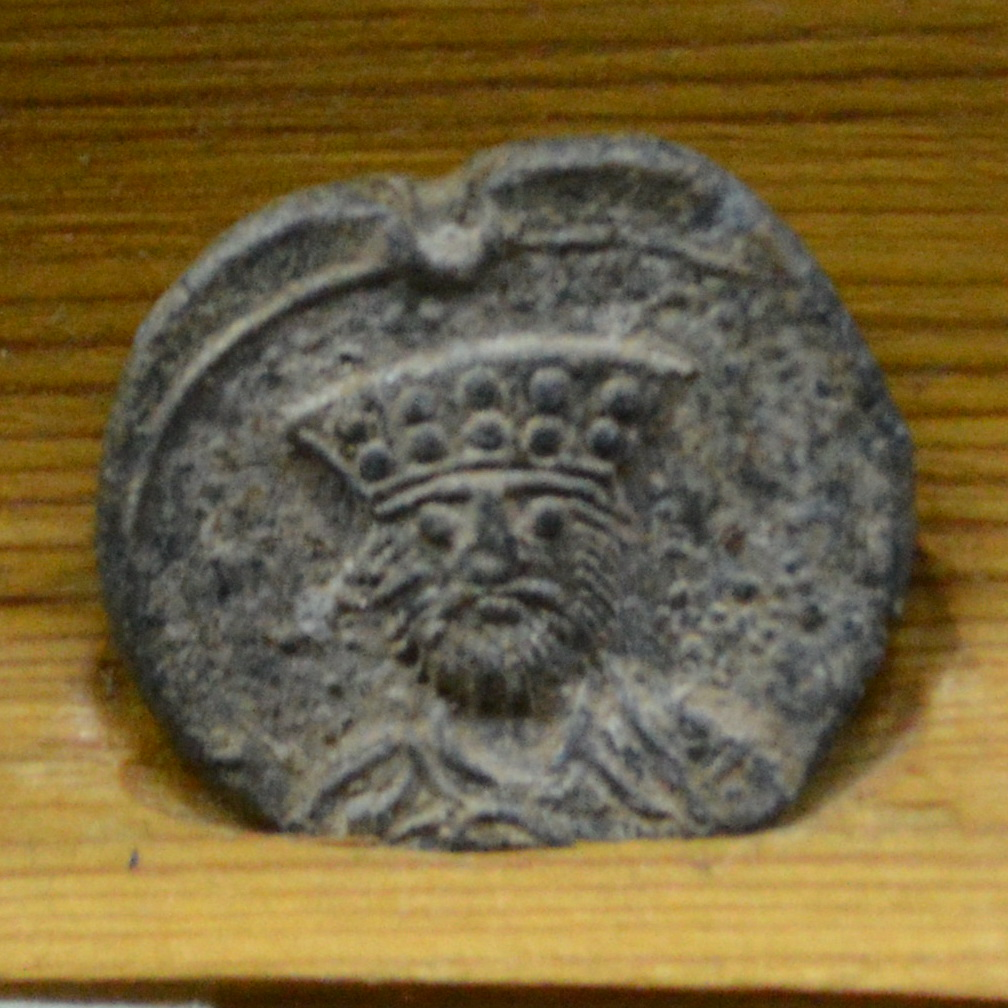
Seal of the Novgorodian posadnik Konstantin Moiseevich, 1118–1119.

Despite legends of posadniki such as Gostomysl that were set in the 9th century, the term posadnik first appears in the Primary Chronicle under the year 977. The earliest Novgorodian posadniki include Dobrynya (an uncle of Vladimir the Great), his son Konstantin Dobrynich, and Ostromir, who is famous for patronizing the Ostromir Gospels, among the first books published in Russia (it is now housed in the National Library of Russia in St. Petersburg). The posadnik was a representative of the prince who served during his absence, and was therefore appointed by the prince, but in 1088, the boyar (noble) leadership for the first time appointed the posadnik without consulting the ruling prince, Mstislav Vladimirovich, who was still a child.

The strength of the government of the posadnik depended on multiple factors, including his capability, his support from powerful political figures inside and outside the city, and the political and economic situation. Novgorod is often referred to as a republic from 1136–1137, when it expelled the prince and took control of its own affairs. However, the prince remained the head of state and was usually someone close to the grand princes of Vladimir-Suzdal. The prince of Novgorod was usually busy elsewhere in Russia and therefore absent from Novgorod, and so his responsibilities were often passed to the namestnik, although the posadnik was the dominant partner, with chronicles supporting the view that the posadnik was effectively the ruler most of the time.

In the Novgorod Republic, the city's posadnik was elected from among the boyars by the Novgorod veche (public assembly). As a result, the posadnik was the main representative of Novgorod's elite. Term limits were applied by the end of the 13th century, with the posadnik limited to one-year appointments. Novgorodian boyars differed from boyars in the other Russian principalities, in that the category was not caste-like and that every rich merchant could reasonably hope to reach the rank of boyar. The leading historian Valentin Yanin found that most posadniki held the office consecutively for sometimes a decade or more and then often passed the office on to their sons or another close relative, indicating that the office was held within boyar clans and that the elections were not really "free and fair". Yanin's theory challenged historians' understanding of the Novgorod Republic, showing it to be a boyar republic with little or no democratic elements. It also showed the land-owning boyarstvo to be more powerful than the merchant and artisan classes, which until that time were thought to play a significant role in the political life of the city. It also called into question the true nature of the veche, which up until that time had been considered democratic by most scholars. However, Yanin's interpretation of the Novgorodian government as a hereditary oligarchy is not universally accepted.

Originally, there was one posadnik, but over time, the office multiplied until, by the end of the republic, there were approximately 24 posadniki. There were also posadniki for each of the city's kontsy ('ends'), or boroughs. The multiplication of the office dates to the 1350s, when the posadnik Ontsifor Lukinich implemented a series of reforms. Retired posadniki took the title of "old posadnik" (старый посадник), and the current, serving posadnik was known as the stepenny posadnik (степенный посадник). In accordance with the reform of 1416–1417, the number of posadniki was increased threefold, and stepenniye posadniki were to be elected for a six-month period. In this manner, the various boyar clans could share power and one or another of them would neither monopolize power or be left out if they lost an election. However, it diluted power in the boyarstvo. Some scholars have argued that the archbishop of Novgorod became the head of the republic and stood above the fray of partisan politics that raged among the boyardom, but the archbishops seem to have shared power with the boyardom and the collective leadership tried to rule by consensus. The dilution of boyar power may, however, have weakened Novgorod in the 15th century, thus explaining the series of defeats it suffered at Moscow's hands and the eventual end of its independence.

The posadnichestvo (mayoralty) was abolished, along with the veche, when Grand Prince Ivan III took direct control of the city in 1478. In fact, upon being asked by Archbishop Feofil (1470–1480) on behalf of the Novgorodians what type of government he wanted, Ivan (speaking through Vassian Patrikeyev) told them: "there will be no veche bell in our patrimony of Novgorod; there will be no posadnik, and we will conduct our own government".

=== Pskov ===
There were 78 known posadniki in Pskov between 1308 and 1510. The posadnichestvo was abolished in Pskov in 1510, when Grand Prince Vasili III took direct control of the city.

== See also ==
- ru:Список новгородских посадников [List of Novgorod posadniki]

== Sources ==
- Elton, G. R. (2 August 1990). The New Cambridge Modern History: Volume 2, The Reformation, 1520-1559. Cambridge University Press. ISBN 978-0-521-34536-1.
- Feldbrugge, Ferdinand Joseph Maria (2009). Law in Medieval Russia. BRILL. ISBN 978-90-04-16985-2.
- Feldbrugge, Ferdinand J. M. (2 October 2017). A History of Russian Law: From Ancient Times to the Council Code (Ulozhenie) of Tsar Aleksei Mikhailovich of 1649. BRILL. ISBN 978-90-04-35214-8.
- Kaiser, Daniel H. (14 July 2014). The Growth of the Law in Medieval Russia. Princeton University Press. ISBN 978-1-4008-5559-9.
- Langer, Lawrence N. (1984). "The Posadnichestvo of Pskov: Some Aspects of Urban Administration in Medieval Russia". Slavic Review. 43 (1): 46–62. doi:10.2307/2498734. ISSN 0037-6779.
- Paul, Michael C. (March 2007). "Secular Power and the Archbishops of Novgorod before the Muscovite Conquest". Kritika: Explorations in Russian and Eurasian History. 8 (2): 231–270. doi:10.1353/kri.2007.0020.
- Paul, Michael C. (2008). "Was The Prince of Novgorod a "Third-Rate Bureaucrat" after 1136?". Jahrbücher für Geschichte Osteuropas. 56 (1): 72–113. ISSN 0021-4019.
- Yanin, Valentin L. (2003). Новгородские посадники [Novgorodian posadniks] (in Russian). Языки славянской культуры. ISBN 978-5-94457-106-9.
