= Sovet gospod =

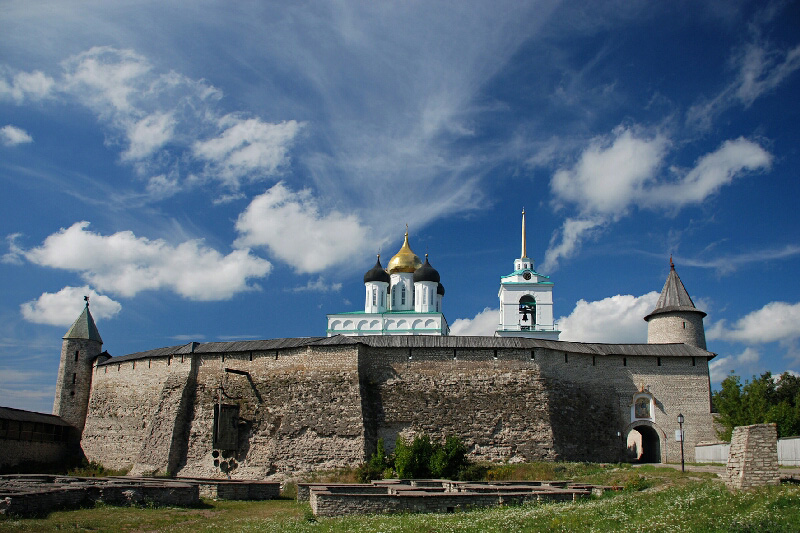
Kremlin of Pskov, the central administrative center of the 15th century Pskov Republic

The Council of Lords (Russian: Совет господ, romanized: Sovet gospod) was, according to the traditional scholarship, the executive organ of the Novgorod veche. In Pskov, it was known as the Lords (Russian: Господа).

== Novgorod the Great ==
In Novgorod, the Council of Lords was said to have been chaired by the Archbishop of Novgorod and composed of the posadniks (the incumbent and retired posadniks), tysyatskys (incumbent and retired), and other important members of the high nobility (boyars). It met, after 1433, in the Chamber of Facets, part of the archiepiscopal palace in Novgorod built by Evfimy II.

Valentin Yanin has argued that the Council of Lords was the real governing body in Novgorod and that it controlled the veche, which was merely a sham through which the common people were tricked into thinking they were participating in government. More recently though, Jonas Granberg has called into question the very existence of the Council of Lords, arguing that it is an invention of historians based on very sparse sources and much conjecture based on other governing bodies elsewhere in Europe.

== Pskov ==
The Pskov Judicial Charter and other sources speak of "The Lords" but it is not clear if this is a formal body or a more general term like "the city fathers" or something to that effect.
