= Tysiatskii =

Military leader in Kievan Rus' and Russian principalities

A tysiatskii, alternatively transliterated as tysyatsky (Russian: тысяцкий, IPA: [ˈtɨsʲɪt͡skʲɪj], lit. 'thousandman', pl. тысяцкие, tysiatskie, tysyatskiye) and sometimes translated as dux or herzog, was a military leader in Kievan Rus' and later the Russian principalities who commanded a people's volunteer army called a tysyacha (Russian: тысяча, lit. 'thousand').

In the Novgorod Republic, the tysiatskii evolved into a judicial or commercial official and was elected by the boyars at a veche meeting for a period of one year. In cities with no veche, the tysiatskie were appointed by the prince from among the noble boyars and could hand down their post to their sons.

== History ==
The first tysiatskii of Kiev is mentioned in 1089; Yan Vyshatich, the son of Vyshata, served the grand prince as a general and tysiatskii. His brother Putyata also served the grand prince in a similar capacity, from 1097 to 1106. During the Kievan period, the tysiatskii was a high-ranking position and often the commander of a major city's detachment. As a local leader, he maintained some independence, and in later years, princes tended to replace this position with that of a voivode. In later times, the tysiatskii often became one of the highest-ranking urban officials, particularly in Novgorod and Pskov.

In the Novgorod Republic, tysiatskie were considered representatives of ordinary people (Russian: чёрные люди, lit. 'black people'). Along with the role as military leaders, they were also supposed to supervise the city fortifications, convene veche meetings, act as ambassadors and as judges in the commercial courts. Like the posadniki (burgomaster), the office was often held by one man for several years in a row and he was often succeeded by his son or another close relative, indicating that the office was held within clans and was not fully elective. By the 14th century, the former tysiatskie maintained considerable political influence and privileges and were known as "old tysiatskie".

In Moscow, the tysiatskii, as the commander of the Moscow militia, held significant power within the prince's administration. Dmitry Donskoy, the grand prince of Moscow, abolished the post in 1374 following the death of Vasily Vasilyevich Veliaminov. This was likely due to the rapid growth of Moscow, which led to the rise of a boyar elite who served as military commanders and regional governors. Dmitry replaced the position with that of a voivode and namestnik. The Novgorodian tysiatskii was abolished when Ivan III formally annexed the city in 1478 and incorporated it into the Moscow grand principality, and the same happened in Pskov, when Vasili III formally annexed it in 1510. However, the term continued to be used in other contexts. For example, the tysiatskii was the formal leader of a wedding ceremony. Vladimir of Staritsa was the tysiatskii for the wedding of Ivan IV of Russia and Anastasia Romanovna in 1547.
