= Chamber of Facets =

Monument in Russia

Episcopal chamber (Chamber of facets)
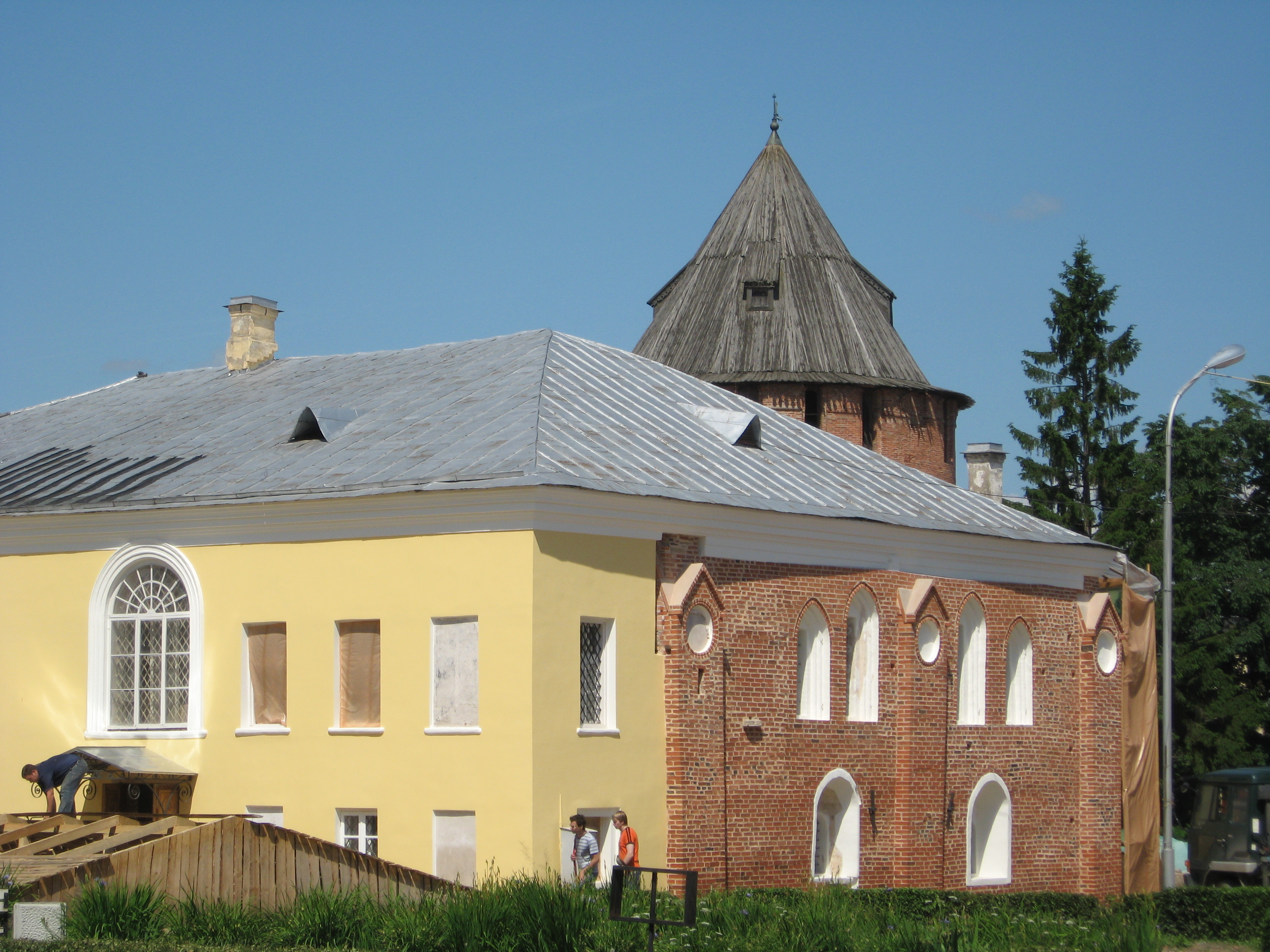
- Episcopal chamber (Chamber of facets) in 2010
- Interactive map of Episcopal chamber (Chamber of facets)
- 58°31′22″N 31°16′35″E
- Location: Veliky Novgorod, Russia

History
- Built: 1433

Site notes
- Architectural style: Brick Gothic

UNESCO World Heritage Site
- Official name: The ensemble of Novgorod Kremlin
- Type: Cultural
- Criteria: ii, iv, vi
- Designated: 1993
- Reference no.: 5310033026
- Country: Russia

The Episcopal Chamber (Russian: Владычная палата) or Chamber of Facets (Russian: Грановитая палата) is a 15th-century monument located in Novgorod Kremlin, Veliky Novgorod, Russia. It is an exceptional example of Gothic architecture in Russia, and included in the UNESCO World heritage list, along with other historic buildings in the city.

== History ==
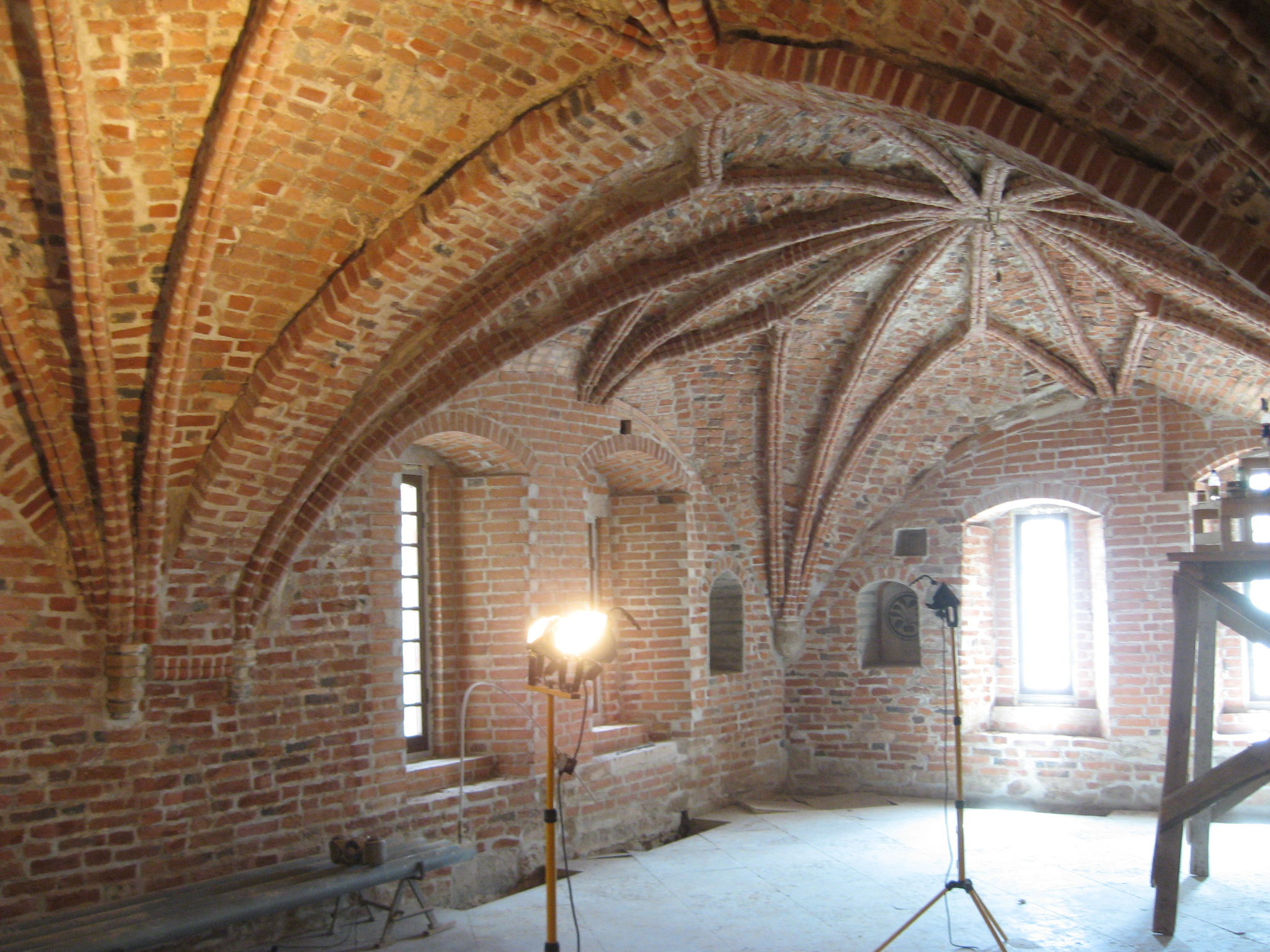
The main hall

The Chamber was part of the Episcopal complex founded in 1433 by order of Euthymius II, Archbishop of Novgorod. According to the Second Novgorodian Chronicle, foreign artisans took part in the building process. It is also indicated by the European Gothic wimpergs, fan traceries, lancet windows and other architectural features typical of the style. The ancient Novgorodian icon, "The Vision of Sexton Tarasius", which contains an image of the Chamber, shows that in the past the building had stepped gables with lancet niches, which are further Gothic features of the period.

In 1441, the Chamber was decorated with frescoes. The main hall was a meeting place for the Council of Aristocrats, a body in the Novgorod republic. After the massacre of Novgorod in 1473, the Chamber was the place where the charter for joining the Novgorod republic to the Duchy of Moscow was read out publicly and signed by Ivan III of Russia.

The Chamber later underwent substantial rebuilding resulting in its current 19th-century exterior. The main facade in particular was changed and the eaves of the building raised. In 1822, the Chamber was turned into the Church in honour of Ivan, a 12th-century saint and Archbishop of Novgorod.

In Soviet times, the building was transformed into museum for arts and crafts.

== Reconstruction ==
In 2008, the building was reconstructed to return its exterior closer to the original Gothic style. In July 2008, the remains of a building believed to be the house of Novgorod Archbishop Bazil were found near the Chamber. In the Chamber's cellar extensive underground vaults were found.

A prospective task for the conservationists and historians is to restore the Chamber's historical gallery near the gateway.

== Further reading (Russian) ==
- Гормин В.В. Грановитая палата: Краеведческий очерк. - Л.: Лениздат, 1980. - 64 с.
- Ядрышников В.А. Грановитая палата 1433 год. - Н.: Исторический паспорт НСНРПМ, 1981
- Владычная палата Новгородского кремля / Э. А. Гордиенко, 104,[3] с. ил. 16 см, Л. Лениздат 1991
