= Valentin Yanin =

Russian historian (1929–2020)

- Валентин Янин
- Born: 6 February 1929; Vyatka, Russian SFSR, Soviet Union
- Died: 2 February 2020 (aged 90); Moscow, Russian Federation
- Occupation: Historian

Valentin Lavrentievich Yanin (Russian: Валентин Лаврентьевич Янин; 6 February 1929 – 2 February 2020) was a leading Russian historian who authored 700 books and articles. He had also edited a number of important journals and primary sources, including works on medieval Russian law, sphragistics and epigraphy, archaeology and history. His expertise was medieval Rus' especially Novgorod the Great, where he had headed archaeological digs beginning in 1962.

== Early life ==
Yanin was born in Vyatka. His maternal grandparents were arrested in 1937 and died in a prison camp in 1938. His father was apparently on a list to be executed but escaped this fate and moved with his family to Moscow. Yanin finished his secondary education in 1946, graduating with a Gold Medal; he matriculated at Moscow State University in 1951.

== Research ==
In 1954, he defended his Kandidat thesis on the monetary systems of pre-Mongol Rus. This was published as The Monetary and Weight Systems of Medieval Russia ("Денежно-весовые системы русского средневековья") and has become a classic. His doctoral thesis on the posadniks of Novgorod followed in 1962 and significantly changed our understanding of the constitution of the Novgorod Republic. The book demonstrated that the office of posadnik, while subject to election every year, was often held by one man for several consecutive years, sometimes more than a decade, and then passed on to his sons or other members of his clan. It shattered the earlier image of Novgorod as a more democratic republic and showed it to be ruled by a boyar aristocracy (not unlike other medieval republics).

Yanin's monograph about the seals of Ancient Rus (2 volumes, 1970) summed up half a century of Soviet sphragistics research. After that, Yanin turned his attention to the birch bark documents of Novgorod, on which he was considered the greatest living authority (alongside Andrey Zaliznyak).

== Honours and positions ==
In 1964, Yanin became professor in the department of archaeology in the Faculty of History at Moscow State University.

Since 1978, Yanin had held the chair in archaeology at the Moscow University.

He was a member of the President's Committee for the Defence of the Material Culture of the Russian Federation and a member of the Consultative Committee of the Ministry of Culture of the Russian Federation.

In 1962, he was elected a corresponding member of the Soviet Academy of Sciences; he became a full academician in 1990. In 1999, he became the first historian to be awarded the Lomonosov Gold Medal.

His other awards included:

- Order of Merit for the Fatherland 4th class
- Order of Lenin
- Order of the Red Banner of Labour
- Order of Friendship of Peoples
- Medal "Veteran of Labour"
- USSR State Prize (1970)
- Lenin Prize (1984)
- Demidov Prize (1993)
- State Prize of the Russian Federation (1996)
- Yaroslav the Wise Medal of the first degree of Yaroslav-the-Wise Novgorod State University
- Triumph Prize (2002)
- Solzhenitsyn Prize (2010).

He was an honorary citizen of Novgorod the Great and an honorary member of the Novgorodian Society of Lovers of Antiquities. He died in Moscow on 2 February 2020 at the age of 90.
