= Kontsy =

Five boroughs into which medieval Veliky Novgorod was divided

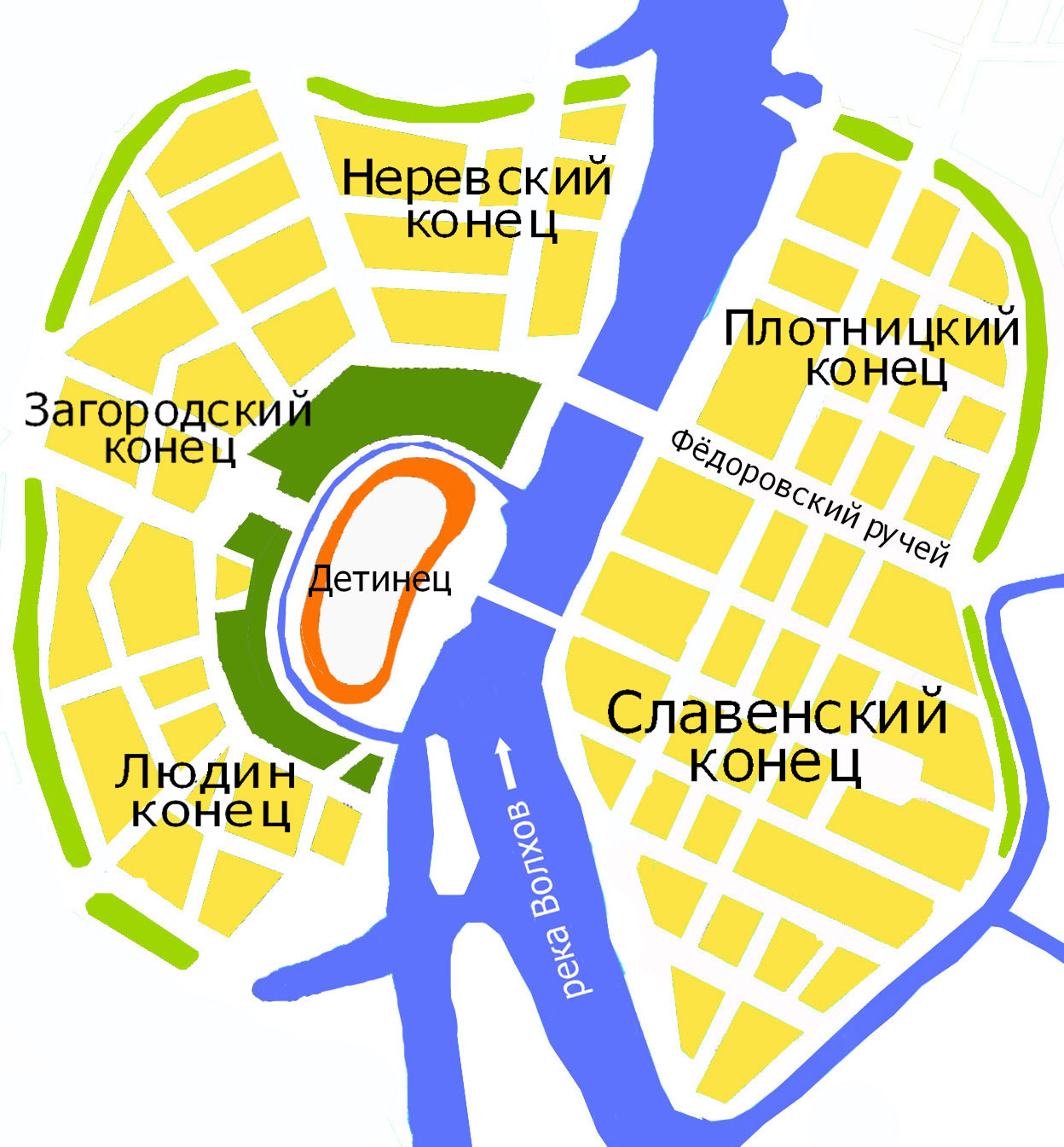
Map of the Kontsy, with the Novgorod Kremlin in red

The kontsy (Russian: концы, IPA: [kɐnˈtsɨ], sg. конец, konets, lit. 'ends') were the five boroughs into which medieval Veliky Novgorod was divided. They were based on the three original settlements that combined to form the city toward the end of the tenth century: the Nerev End, the Liudin ("People's") End (also called the Goncharsky or "Potters" End), and the Slavno End; two later additions - the Plotnitskii ("Carpenters'") End and Zagorodskii ("Beyond the City" or "Beyond the Fortress", as "gorod" meant both "city" and "fortress" at that time) End formed in 1168 and the 1260s respectively.

The city was also divided into two sides, although this was probably not a distinct administrative unit as were the ends. The Sofia Side was named after the Cathedral of Holy Wisdom and consisted of the Nerev, Zagorodskii and Liudin Ends. The Trade Side of the city consisted of the Slavno and Plotnitsky Ends.

It is believed that the decisions of the all-city veche had to be ratified by the veches of each end, though it is not certain. It is also thought that each end governed one of the Fifths, the five organized territories into which the Novgorodian Land had been divided, although this too is unclear from the sources.

The boroughs retained a degree of autonomy after the end of its independence. The elected starostas were a part of the city administration until the middle of the 17th century and their role became more important at the time when the central government was weak.

== See also ==
- Administrative divisions of the Novgorod Republic
