= Krechevitsy =

Microdistrict of Veliky Novgorod, Russia

Coordinates: 58°37′N 31°24′E

Krechevitsy (Russian: Кречевицы) is a microdistrict (since 2004) of the city of Veliky Novgorod, Russia. It is located remotely (some 15 km north-east) from the city centre, on the left bank of the Volkhov River. Population: 3,363 (2002 Census).

== History ==
Krechevitsy was first mentioned in chronicles as a village in 1500. A military settlement was established in 1817 by the order of Alexander I (among the people who served in a local cavalry division was the poet Nikolay Gumilyov, who mentioned the place in one of the poems). A military air base – Krechevitsy Airport – was founded in 1926. In 1976 construction of a civil international airport based on the existing military facility started following an accident in the Novgorod Airport due to its location too close to residential districts, but the works were abandoned in 1987. The settlement was merged into the city Veliky Novgorod in 2004. The construction of the airport renewed in 2006, and an inauguration of the new airport is foreseen in 2010.
