= Trade Side =

Trade Side Торговая сторона
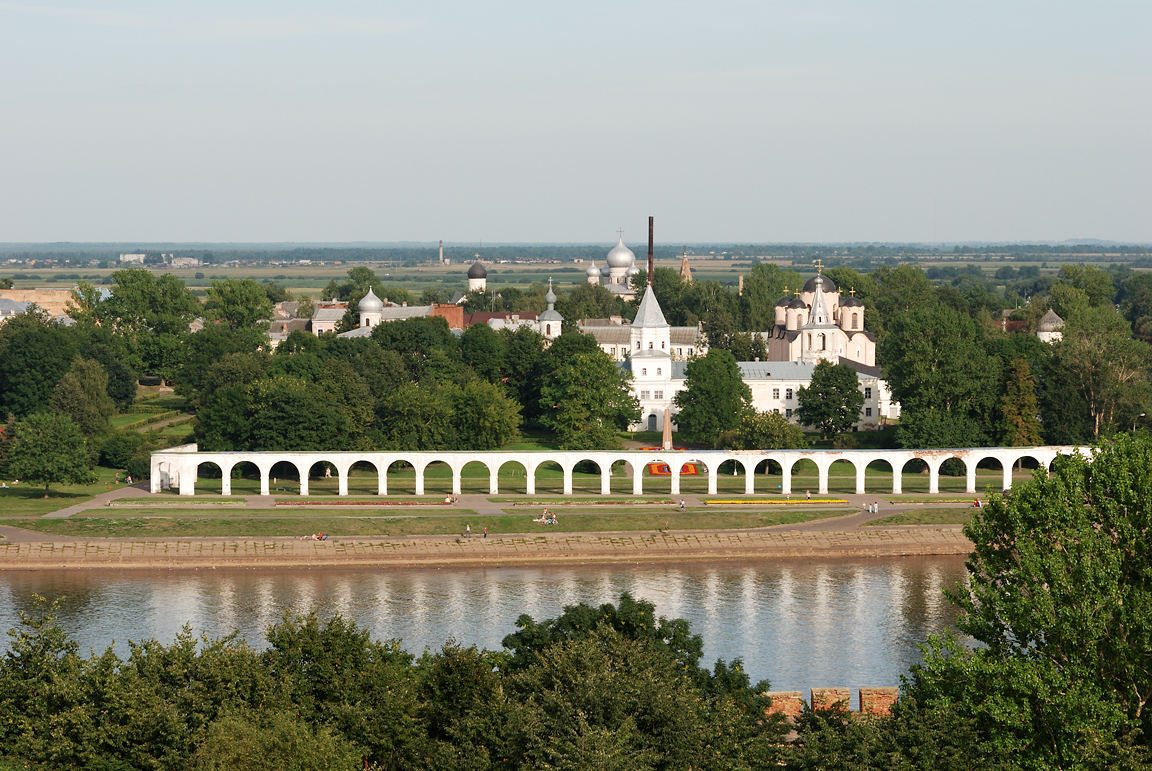
- Yaroslav's Court and Torg

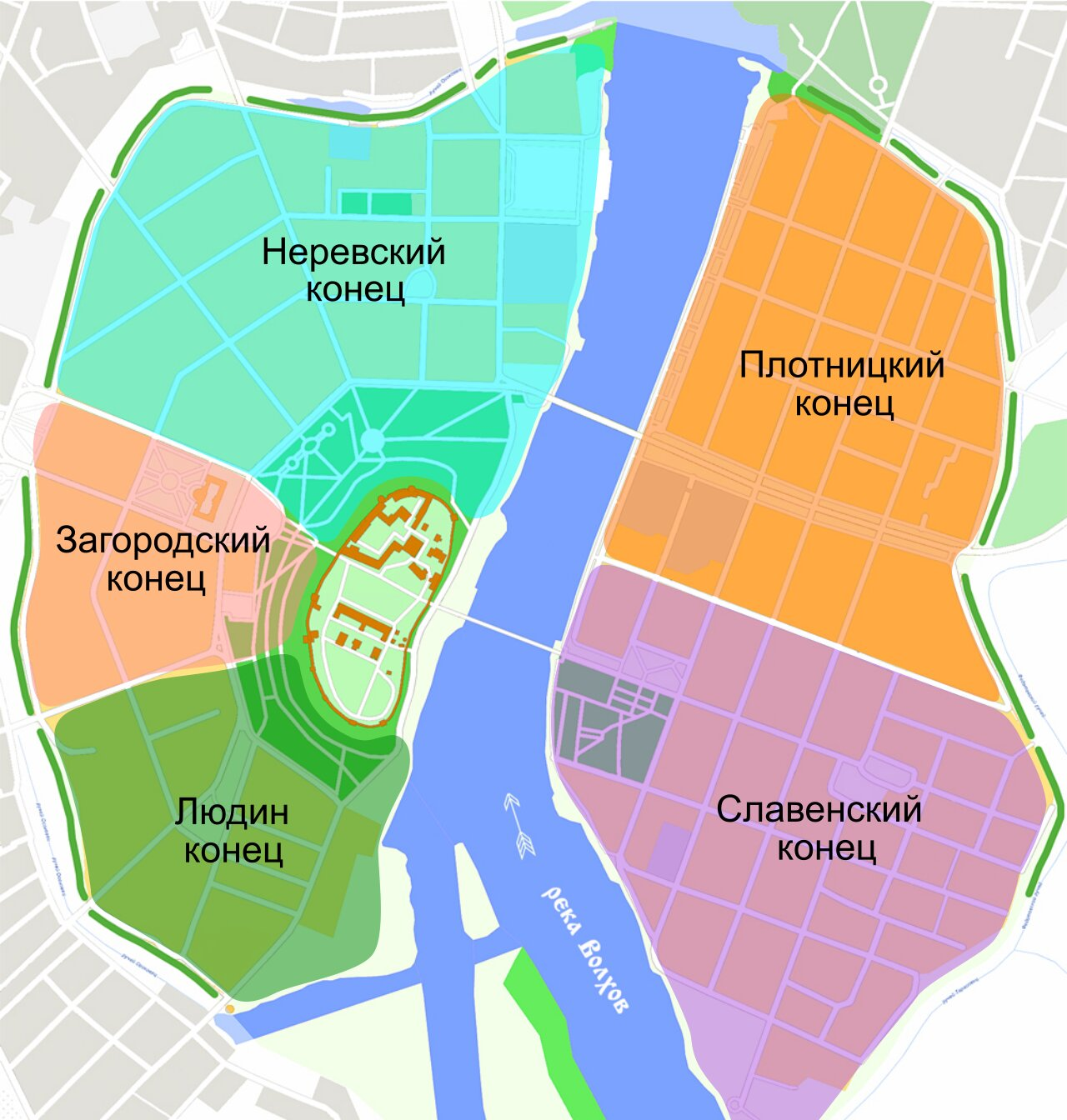
- Slavonic konets marked in purple and Plotnitsky konets marked in orange on the right-bank of the Volkhov
- Coordinates: 58°31′20″N 31°17′30″E
- Country: Russia
- Federal subject: Novgorod Oblast
- Seat: Veliky Novgorod

The Trade (Slavonic) Side (Russian: Торговая (Славенская) сторона) is a historical district in Veliky Novgorod, Russia, located on the right-bank ("side") of the Volkhov. It got its name from the Torg (city market) located on it. The other half was called the Sophia Side after the Cathedral of St. Sophia.

From the 10th to 12th centuries, the Slavonic konets ("end") of Novgorod was located on the Trade Side. In the 12th century, the Plotnitsky (Carpenters's) konets was separated from the Slavonic konets, and since then, the Trade Side consisted of two kontsy.

The Trade Side began to be populated since the 10th century and the marketplace (Torg) appeared there. In the 11th century Yaroslav's Court, the princely residence, was built on this side as well.

== Sources ==
- Alexander Sorokin (2007). "Novgorod's Torg". Velikiy Novgorod. History and Culture of the 9th–17th Centuries: Encyclopedic Dictionary. Saint Petersburg: Nestor History. pp. 455–456. ISBN 5-98187-236-5.
