= Saint Nicholas Cathedral, Novgorod =

Saint Nicholas Cathedral
- Николо-Дворищенский собор
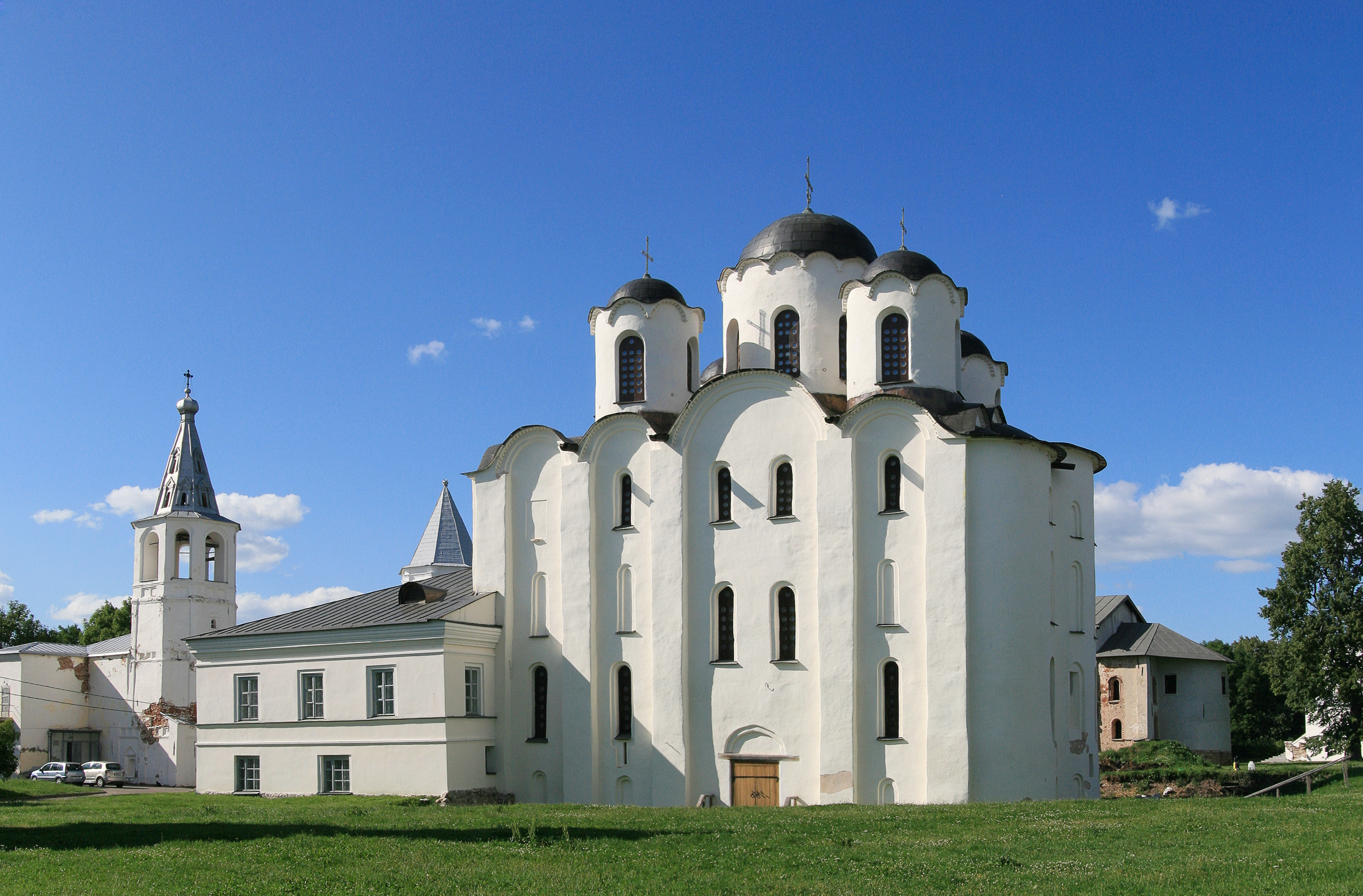
- Saint Nicholas Cathedral
- 58°31′04″N 31°17′07″E
- Location: Veliky Novgorod
- Country: Russia
- Denomination: Russian Orthodox

History
- Founded: 1113
- Founder: Mstislav I of Kiev
- Dedication: Saint Nicholas

Architecture
- Style: Russian
- Groundbreaking: 1113
- Completed: 1136

Saint Nicholas Cathedral (Russian: Николо-Дворищенский собор, Nikolo-Dvorishchensky Cathedral, Saint Nicholas Cathedral on Yaroslav's Court), founded by Mstislav the Great in 1113 and consecrated in 1136, is the oldest surviving building in the central part of Veliky Novgorod after the Saint Sophia Cathedral.

The Saint Nicholas Cathedral is on the World Heritage list as a part of object 604 Historic Monuments of Novgorod and Surroundings. The cathedral was designated by the Russian government as an architectural monument of federal significance (#5310046007).

== History ==
The cathedral is located outside of the kremlin walls, on the right bank of the Volkhov River at the Yaroslav's Court. It was founded by Mstislav, the prince of Novgorod, in 1113, however, the construction took over twenty years, and the cathedral was consecrated in 1136, when Novgorod was already a republic. Presumably, the cathedral was supposed to serve the residence of the prince located at the Yaroslav's Court and was connected to the residence. Mstislav was the Prince of Novgorod between 1097 and 1117, and during his tenure he founded a big number of churches. The completion date for the cathedral is not known precisely, however the cathedral was completed and consecrated by 1136. Chronicles mention that in this year Prince Sviatoslav Olgovich was betrothed in the cathedral. Since the 13th century, the cathedral belonged to the city of Novgorod rather than to the prince, and veche was held near the cathedral. It was mentioned as cathedral in the 17th century. The cathedral was renovated several times in the 18th and the 19th centuries, as well as in 1913. Since 1933 it was open both as a church and as a museum. During the German occupation of Novgorod in World War II, it served as a barrack and was badly damaged. In 1945 the cathedral was returned to Russian Orthodox Church, however, since 1962 it was functioning only as a museum. In 1994–1999 the cathedral was extensively restored.

== Architecture ==
The cathedral is roughly squared in cross-section and has one dome. The roof is supported by four pillars. It is known that in the middle of the 17th century the cathedral had five domes. Apparently, the roof was considerably altered during one of the restorations in the end of the 17th century. Additional volumes were built at the northern (in 1822) and the western (1809) sides of the cathedral.

== Frescoes ==
Fragments of original frescoes from the 12th century have survived. The best preserved fragment depicts Job.
