= Ryurikovo Gorodishche =

Archeological site in Veliky Novgorod, Russia

- Рюриково городище (Russian)
- Gorodishche
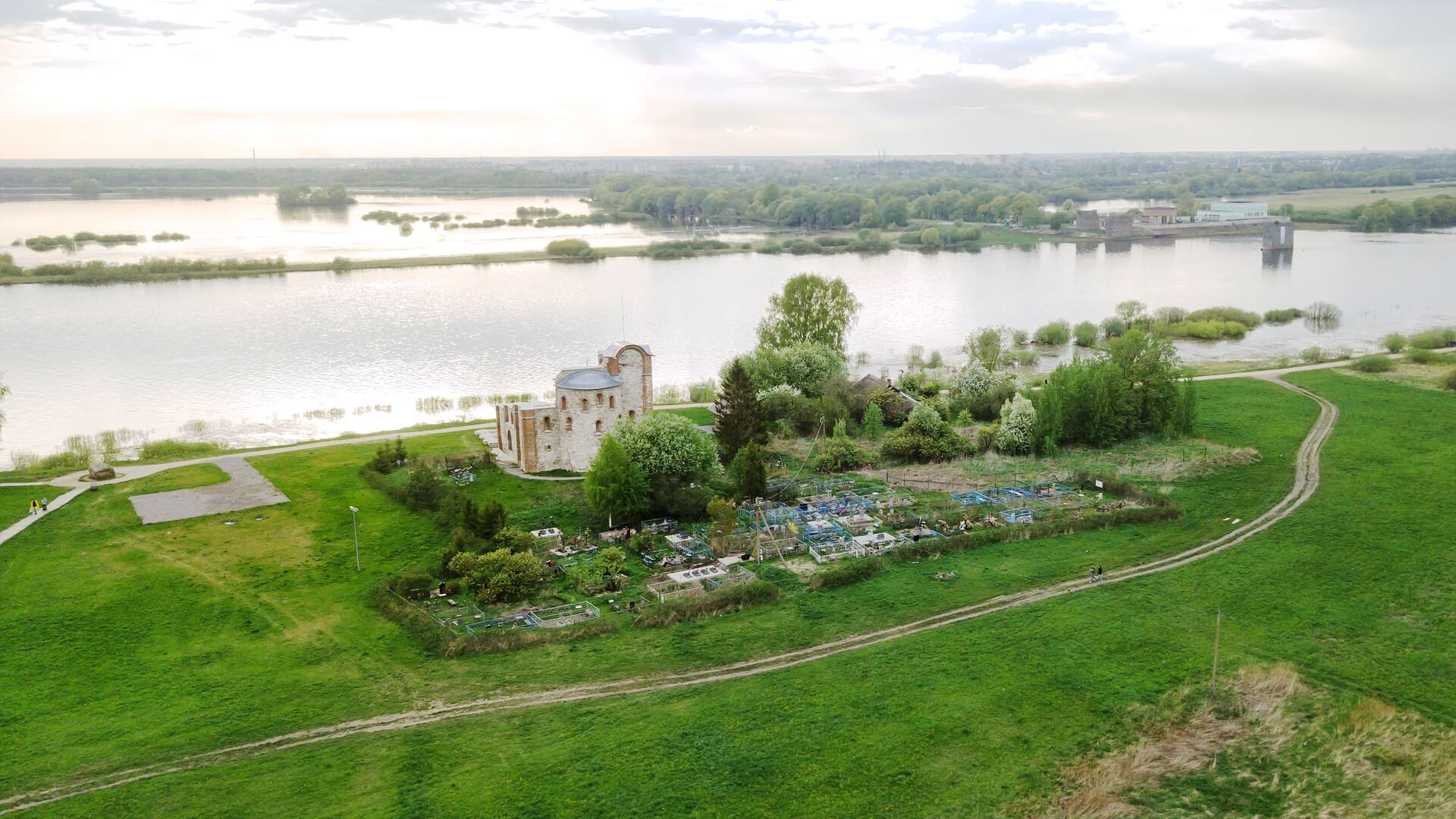

- Location within Novgorod Oblast Location within Russia Location within Europe
- 58°29′N 31°17′E
- Location: Veliky Novgorod, Russia

UNESCO World Heritage Site
- Official name: Historic Monuments of Novgorod and Surroundings
- Type: Cultural
- Criteria: ii, iv, vi
- Designated: 1992 (16th session)
- Reference no.: 604
- State Party: Russia
- Region: Eastern Europe

Ryurikovo Gorodishche (Note: Also transliterated as Rurikovo Gorodische or Rurikovo Gorodishche.) (Russian: Рюриково городище, IPA: [ˈrʲʉrʲɪkəvə ɡərɐˈdʲiɕːə], lit. 'Rurik's hillfort'), also known as Novgorodskoye Gorodishche (Russian: Новгородское городище), or simply Gorodishche, (Note: Russian: Городище.) was a medieval settlement located 2 kilometres (1.2 mi) south of the Novgorod Detinets in Veliky Novgorod, Russia.

Founded in the 9th century, it lies within the boundaries of the modern city and is considered the direct predecessor of the site of present-day Veliky Novgorod. The archaeological site covers an area of approximately 10 hectares (25 acres) and is located on the right bank of the Volkhov River, where it flows out of Lake Ilmen.

Part of the Historic Monuments of Novgorod and Surroundings, a UNESCO World Heritage Site, it includes the original residence of the princes of Novgorod, connected with the names of many famous political figures of medieval Russia.

== Name ==
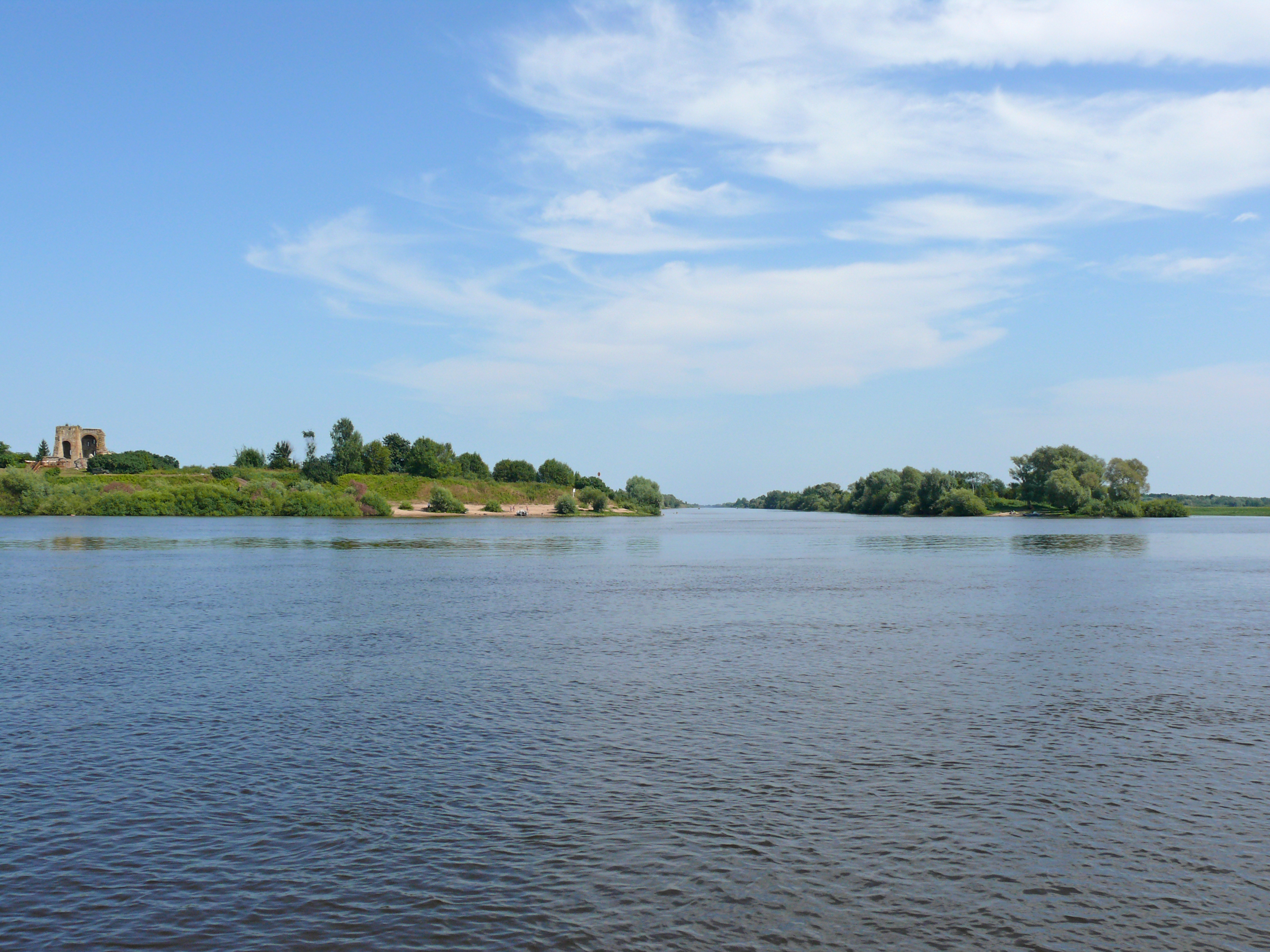
The site of Ryurikovo Gorodishche from Lake Ilmen

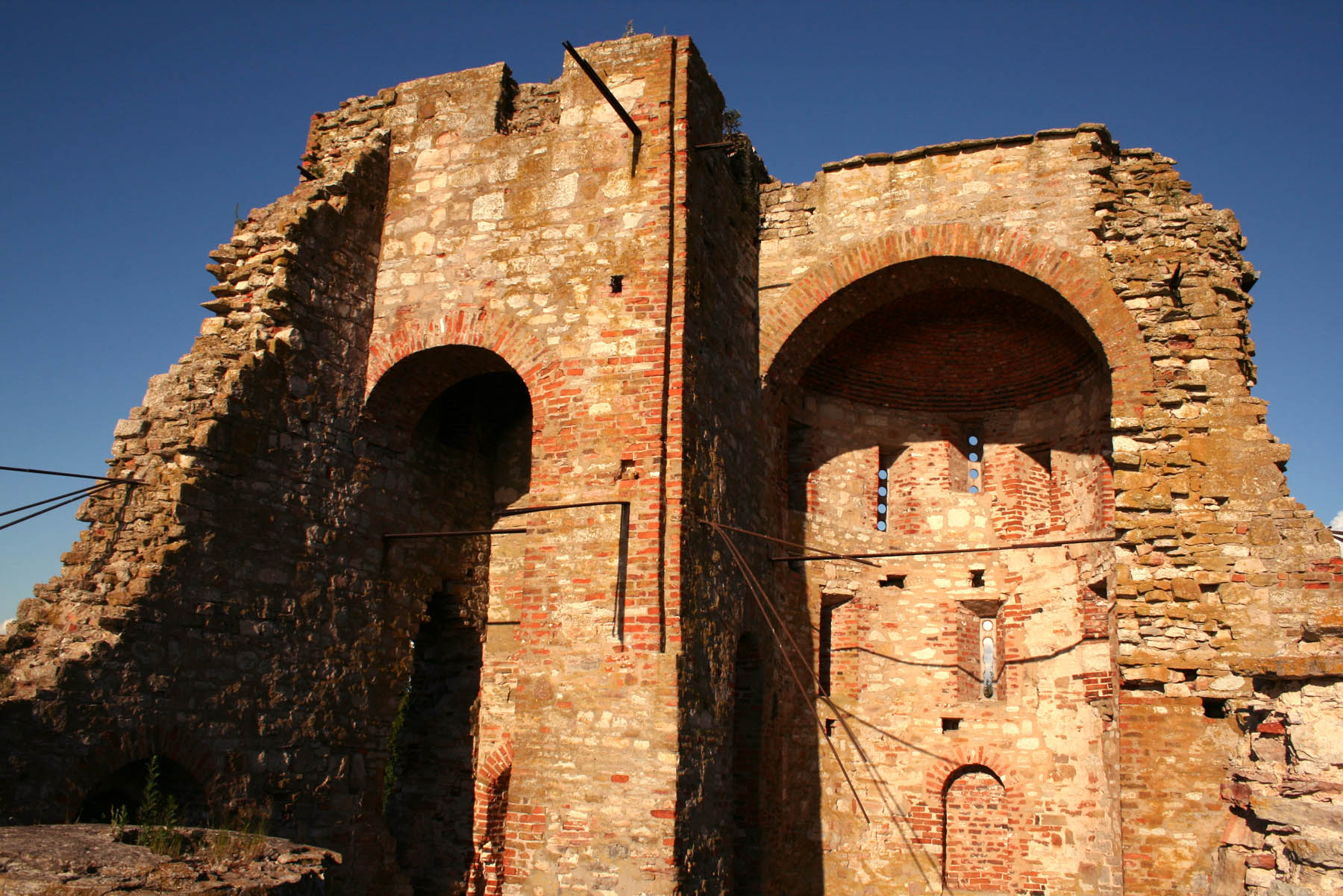
Remains of the 12th-century Church of the Annunciation at Gorodishche

Since the 19th century, it has been called Ryurikovo Gorodishche in honor of Rurik. Before then, the tract, as well as the adjacent village, was called simply Gorodishche; the word Ryurikovo was added under the influence of Russian chronicle legends that identify the settlement with Rurik.

The Old Norse name Hólmgarðr is usually identified with Veliky Novgorod, although it may also have referred to Gorodishche.

== History ==
The settlement is identified as the capital of the Slovenes before the arrival of Rurik. Following his arrival, it became the capital of his state. In the 9th and 10th centuries, it was a military-administrative center as well as a major trade and craft center. It also served as the residence of the prince of Novgorod and his retinue.

In the early 11th century, Yaroslav the Wise moved his princely residence to Yaroslav's Court in Novgorod, but the palace, gridnitsa (hall for junior retainers), administrative buildings, and workshops in Gorodishche remained in use.

Gorodishche is first mentioned in the Novgorod First Chronicle in 1103 in connection with the construction of the Church of the Annunciation under Mstislav Vladimirovich, the second stone church to be built in northern Russia after St. Sophia Cathedral in Novgorod.

In the 15th and 16th centuries, during the period when the grand princes of Moscow grew in power (annexing Novgorod in 1478), several grand princes stayed at Gorodishche, including Vasily II, Ivan III, Vasily III, and Ivan IV.

== See also ==
- Peryn

== Sources ==
- "Городище, село Новгородской губернии" . Brockhaus and Efron Encyclopedic Dictionary (in Russian). 1906.
- Nosov, Ye. N (2015). "Рюриково городище". Большая российская энциклопедия. Том 29: Румыния — Сен-Жан-де-Люз (in Russian). Большая российская энциклопедия. pp. 139–140. ISBN 978-5-85270-366-8. Archived from the original on 4 December 2024.
