= Yaroslav's Court =

Princely compound in Novgorod, Russia

Coordinates: 58°31′08″N 31°17′00″E

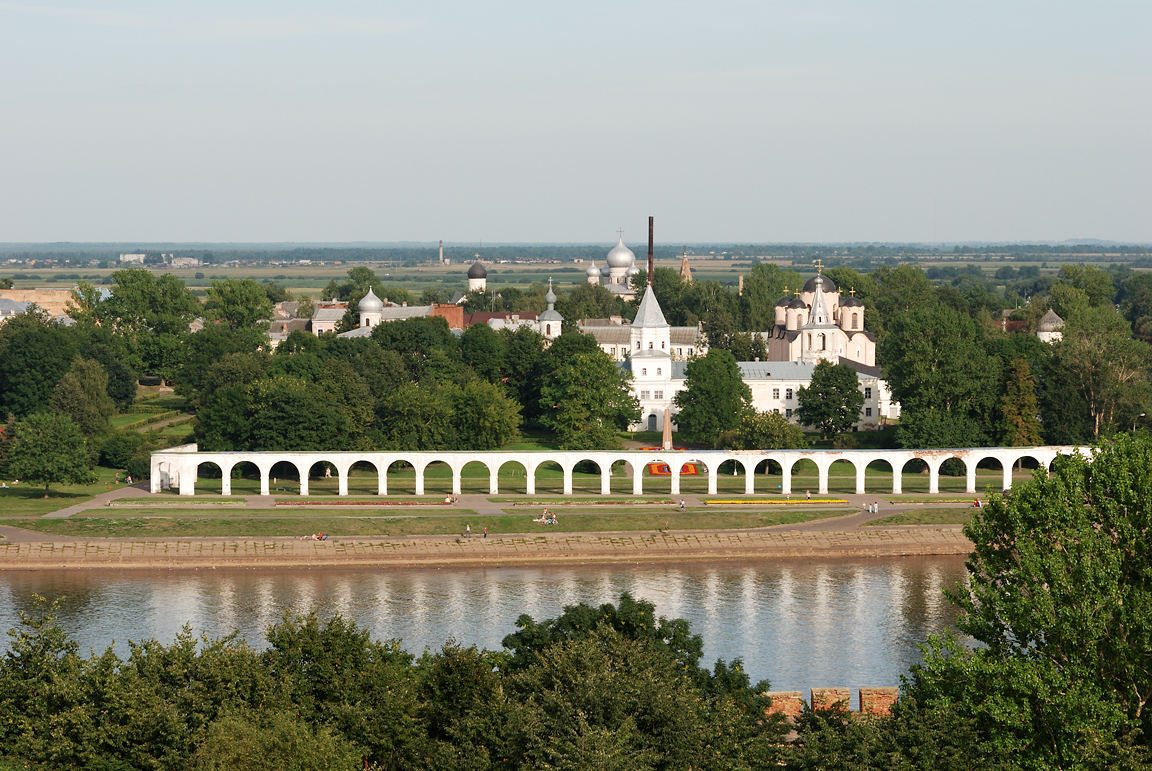
Yaroslav's Court.

Yaroslav's Court (Russian: Ярославово дворище, romanized: Yaroslavovo dvorishche) was a princely compound in the city of Veliky Novgorod, Russia. It is now roughly the area around the Trade Side and includes the following buildings: St. Nicholas Cathedral, the Church of St. Procopius, and the Church of the Myrrh-Bearing Women.

The prince also had a compound called Gorodische, located south of the Trade Side in the city.

== History ==
Yaroslav's Court is named after Yaroslav the Wise, who built a palace there while he was the prince of Novgorod in the early 11th century.

According to traditional scholarship, after the Novgorodians expelled Prince Vsevolod Mstislavich in 1136, the Novgorodians began electing their princes and forbade them from holding land in Novgorod. Yaroslav's Court then ceased to be a princely compound and the prince continued to reside at Rurikovo Gorodische. Between 1113 and 1136, St. Nicholas Cathedral was built at the court. The cathedral is intact and is the second-oldest building in Novgorod, after the Cathedral of St. Sophia.

The Novgorodian veche (popular assembly) often met in front of Yaroslav's Court. In 1224, several pagan sorcerers were burned at the stake there.

The Trade Side, renovated and heavily modified during the 16th and 17th centuries, is all that is left of the princely palace itself.

In 2025, researchers from the Institute of Archaeology of the Russian Academy of Sciences discovered a seal attributed to Yaroslav the Wise at Yaroslav's Court. It was the second such seal found in Novgorod; the first was discovered in 1994. The researchers described it as one of the oldest Russian seals.

== Sources ==
- "Двор Ярославов" . Brockhaus and Efron Encyclopedic Dictionary (in Russian). 1906.
