= Novgorod Airport =

Airport in northwest Russia

Novgorod Yurievo Airport
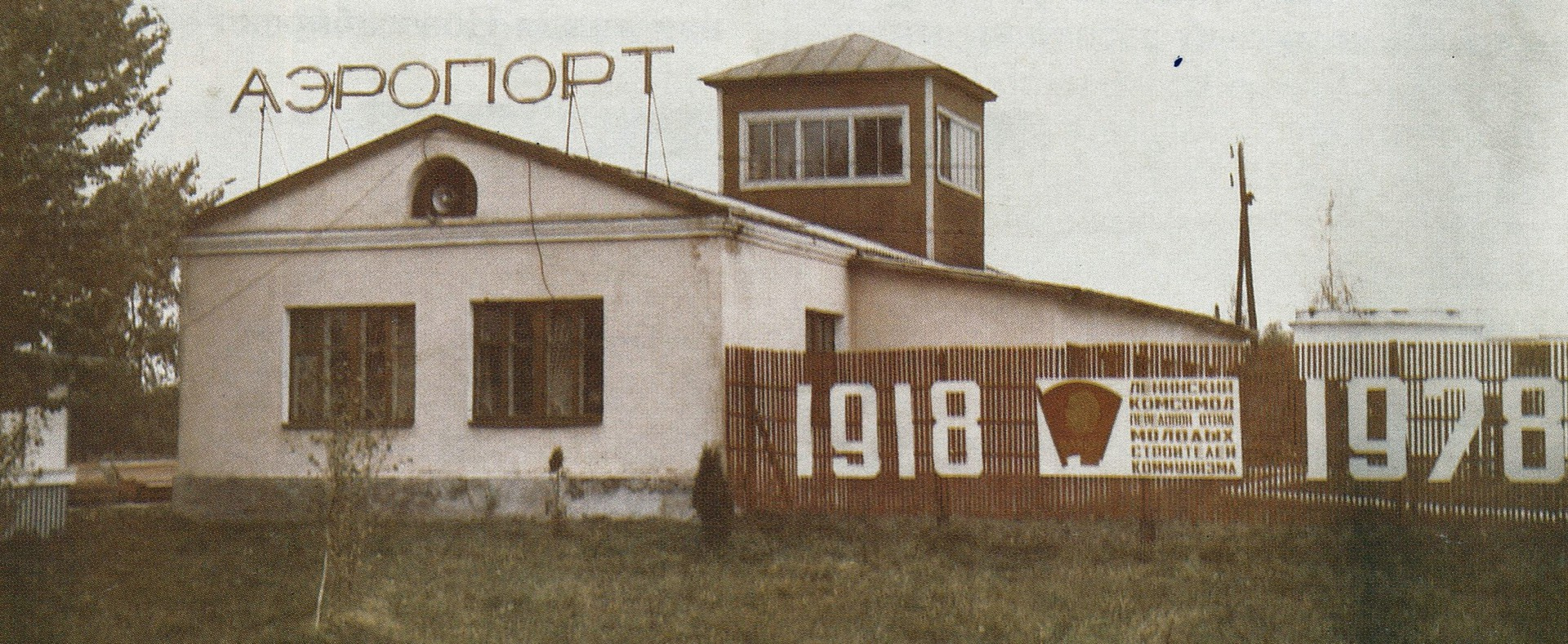
- IATA: NVR; ICAO: ULNN

Summary
- Airport type: Public
- Serves: Velikiy Novgorod, Novgorod Oblast, Russia
- Elevation AMSL: 26 m / 85 ft
- Coordinates: 58°29′36″N 31°14′30″E

Maps
- Novgorod Oblast in Russia

- Location of the airport in the Novgorod Oblast

Runways
Direction	Length		Surface
Direction	m	ft	Surface
02/20	1,320	4,331	Asphalt

Novgorod Yurievo Airport (Russian: Аэропорт Новгород Юрьево) (IATA: NVR, ICAO: ULNN) is a former airport serving the city of Velikiy Novgorod, Novgorod Oblast, Russia, located 4 kilometres (2.5 mi) southwest of the city centre. It was officially closed and replaced by the Krechevitsy Airport in 2002. It was a busy airport during the Soviet era, with regular flights to Minsk, Moscow, Krasnodar and other destinations. After the fall of the Soviet Union in 1991, the airport became abandoned due to economic stagnation. In 1996, the airport was hosting only one regular daily flight to Moscow, but these flights were cancelled soon afterwards due to a small numbers of travellers deterred by high ticket prices.

As of 2006, the only purpose Novgorod Airport serves is hosting a meteorological facility, still operational and providing weather forecasts for the city. The former runway is used for car racing.

Excavations on the site in preparation for a residential development unveiled the foundations of a structure associated with the Arkazhsky Monastery.

== Incidents ==
On October 22, 1975, a Yak-40 plane crashed, flying from Syktyvkar to Riga with an intermediate landing in Novgorod. When landing in fog, the crew mistakenly believed that they had flown over the marker and continued to descend. 700 m away from the glide path at a height of 20 m, the landing gear and wing grazed the roof of the printing house, after which the plane flew over Karl Marx Avenue, hit several trees and еhe plane collided with a four-story apartment building. 4 crew members, 2 passengers, 5 residents of the city were killed in the accident, eight people were injured.

== See also ==
- List of airports in Russia
