= Krechevitsy Airport =

Airport in Novgorod, Russia

Krechevitsy
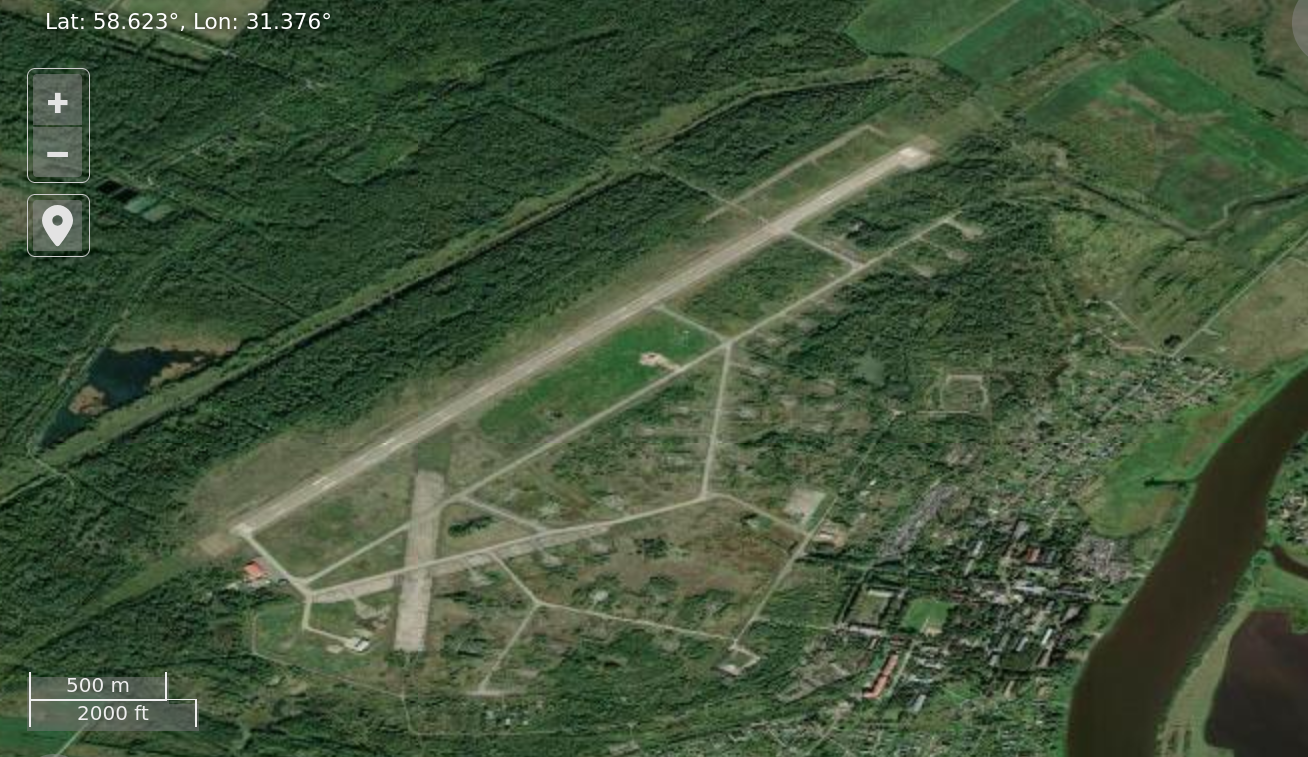
- Satellite imagery of Krechevitsy Airport

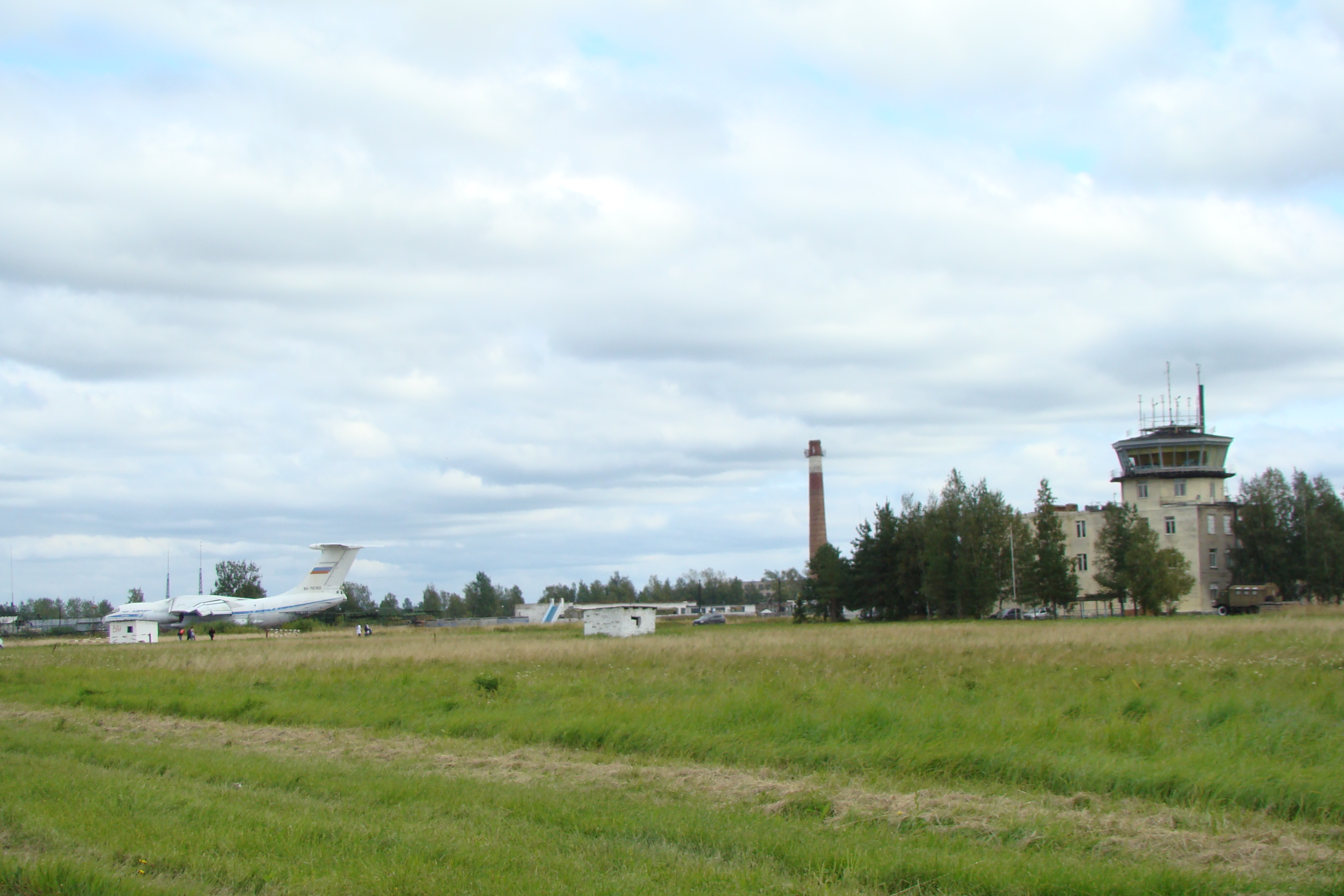
- IATA: none; ICAO: none

Summary
- Location: Novgorod
- Elevation AMSL: 85 ft / 26 m
- Coordinates: 58°37′21.18″N 31°22′33.31″E

Map
- Location of airport in Novgorod Oblast Krechevitsy (Russia)

Runways
Direction	Length		Surface
Direction	ft	m	Surface
04/22	8,200	2,500	Concrete

Krechevitsy is a functioning civil airfield, formerly Russian Airforce base located 11 km northeast of Veliky Novgorod, Russia (near Krechevitsy). It contains 30 large revetments in a sprawling taxiway pattern, suitable for large transports. It was home to 110 VTAP (110th Military Transport Aviation Regiment), of the 61st Air Army, flying Ilyushin Il-76 aircraft. However, 110 VTAP was disbanded in 2009.

A construction of a civil international airport based on the military facility was scheduled to be completed by summer 2009, to coincide with 1150th anniversary of Veliky Novgorod. The reconstruction of military airbase into a civil airport for scheduled flights has been postponed multiple times for many reasons, the last attempt was undertaken in 2019–2020, the airport is scheduled to open in 2024.

Currently Krechevitsy is used by light aviation amateurs. Basic ground facilities such as refuelling and traffic control are available. In September 2019 Severstal airline company made a test flight to Krechevitsy with its CRJ-200 regional jet.

== See also ==
- List of airports in Russia
- List of military airbases in Russia
