= Veliky Novgorod =

City in Novgorod Oblast, Russia

Veliky Novgorod Великий Новгород
- City
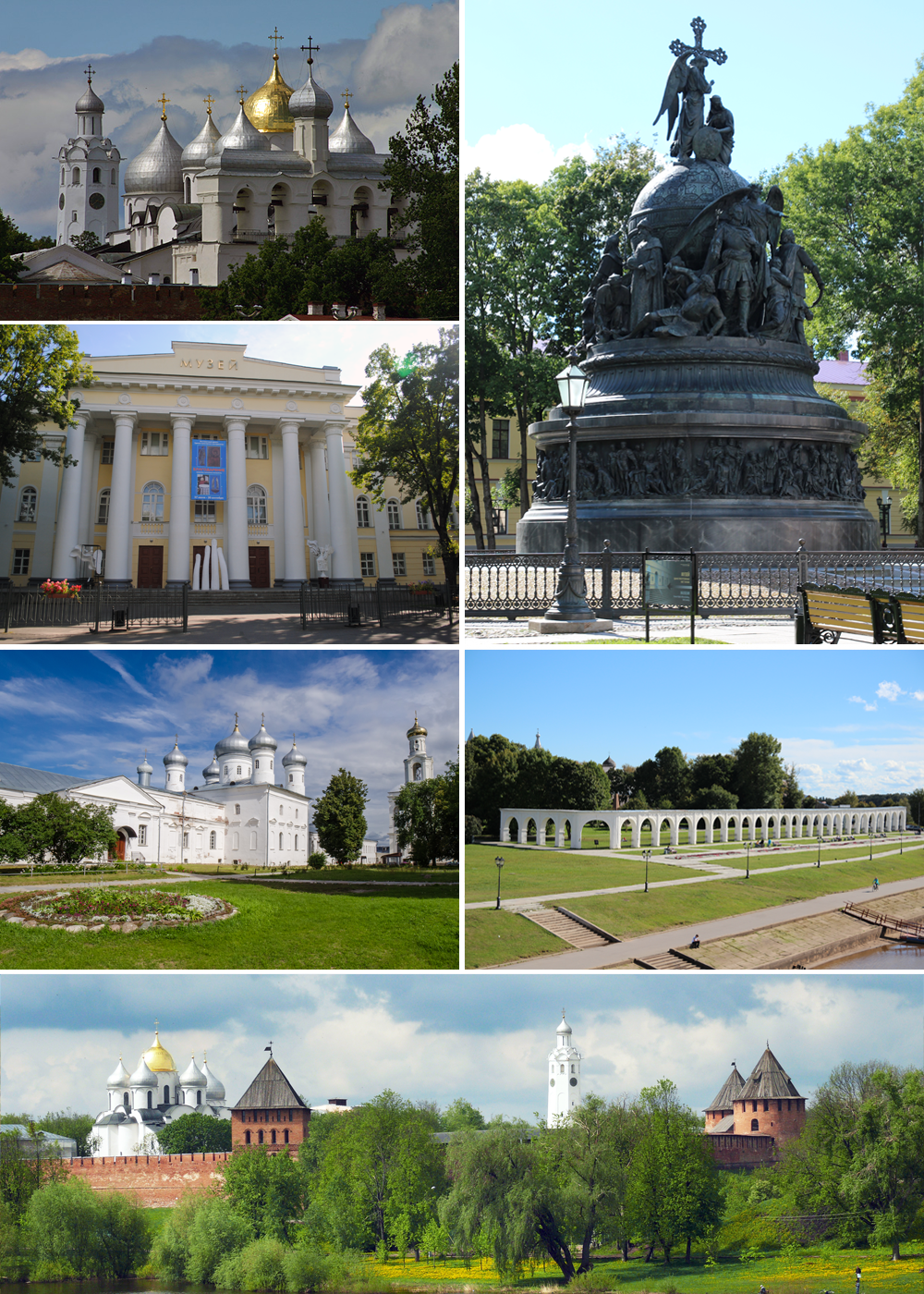
- Counter-clockwise from top right: the Millennium of Russia, the Cathedral of Saint Sophia, the Fine Arts Museum, St. George's Monastery, the Kremlin, Yaroslav's Court

- Flag Coat of arms
- Interactive map of Veliky Novgorod
- Location of Veliky Novgorod Veliky Novgorod (European Russia) Veliky Novgorod (Europe)
- Coordinates: 58°33′N 31°16′E
- Country: Russia
- Federal subject: Novgorod Oblast
- First mentioned: 859

Government
  - Body: Duma
  - Mayor: Aleksandr Rozbaum

Area
  - Total: 90 km^{2} (35 sq mi)
- Elevation: 25 m (82 ft)

Population (2010 Census)
  - Total: 218,717
  - Estimate (2025): 218,681 (−0%)
  - Rank: 85th in 2010
  - Density: 2,400/km^{2} (6,300/sq mi)

Administrative status
  - Subordinated to: city of oblast significance of Veliky Novgorod
  - Capital of: Novgorod Oblast, city of oblast significance of Veliky Novgorod

Municipal status
  - Urban okrug: Veliky Novgorod Urban Okrug
  - Capital of: Veliky Novgorod Urban Okrug, Novgorodsky Municipal District
- Time zone: UTC+3 (MSK)
- Postal codes: 173000–173005, 173007–173009, 173011–173016, 173018, 173020–173025, 173700, 173899, 173920, 173955, 173990, 173999
- Dialing code: +7 8162
- OKTMO ID: 49701000001
- Website: www.adm.nov.ru

UNESCO World Heritage Site
- Official name: Historic Monuments of Novgorod and Surroundings
- Criteria: Cultural: (ii)(iv)(vi)
- Reference: 604
- Inscription: 1992 (16th Session)

Veliky Novgorod (/vəˈliːki ˈnɒvɡərɒd/ və-LEE-kee NOV-gə-rod; Russian: Великий Новгород, IPA: [vʲɪˈlʲikʲɪj ˈnovɡərət]; lit. 'Great Newtown'), (Note: Also translated as Great Novgorod or Novgorod the Great.) also known simply as Novgorod, (Note: Russian: Новгород.) is the largest city and the administrative centre of Novgorod Oblast, Russia. The city lies along the Volkhov River, just 6 kilometres (3.7 mi) downstream of its outflow from Lake Ilmen, and is situated on the M10 federal highway, which connects Moscow and Saint Petersburg. The city has a population of 224,286 (2021 census).

Novgorod is one of the oldest cities in Russia; it was first mentioned in the 9th century. From 1136 to 1478, it was the centre of a separate administrative and political entity known as the Novgorod Republic, which controlled much of the Russian North. Novgorod served as the intermediary between other Russian cities and northwestern Europe, allowing it to flourish through trade with the Hanseatic League, whose major trading post, or kontor, in the city was the Peterhof. At its peak in the 14th century, it was one of Europe's largest cities. It was also a major centre of Russian art and culture.

The city was historically known as Veliky Novgorod to distinguish it from other Russian cities known as Novgorod. In 1999, it was officially renamed Veliky Novgorod. UNESCO recognised Novgorod as a World Heritage Site in 1992.

== Climate ==
Veliky Novgorod has a warm-summer humid continental climate (Köppen Dfb). The city has warm summers with temperatures reaching over 30 °C (86 °F) and relatively cold winters with frequent snowfall. The lowest air temperature ever recorded is -45 °C (-49 °F). The warmest month is July with a daily mean of 18.7 °C (65 °F), the coldest month is February with a daily mean of -6 °C (21 °F). The highest amount of precipitation is on average in June with 73 mm (2.9 inches) of precipitation, the driest is March with 30 mm (1.2 inches) of precipitation. The annual amount of precipitation is 603 mm (23.7 inches).

== History ==
Historical population
Year	Pop.	±%
1897	25,736	—
1926	32,764	+27.3%
1939	39,758	+21.3%
1959	60,669	+52.6%
1970	127,944	+110.9%
1979	186,003	+45.4%
1989	229,126	+23.2%
2002	223,263	−2.6%
2010	218,717	−2.0%
2021	224,286	+2.5%
Source: Census data

=== Early developments ===
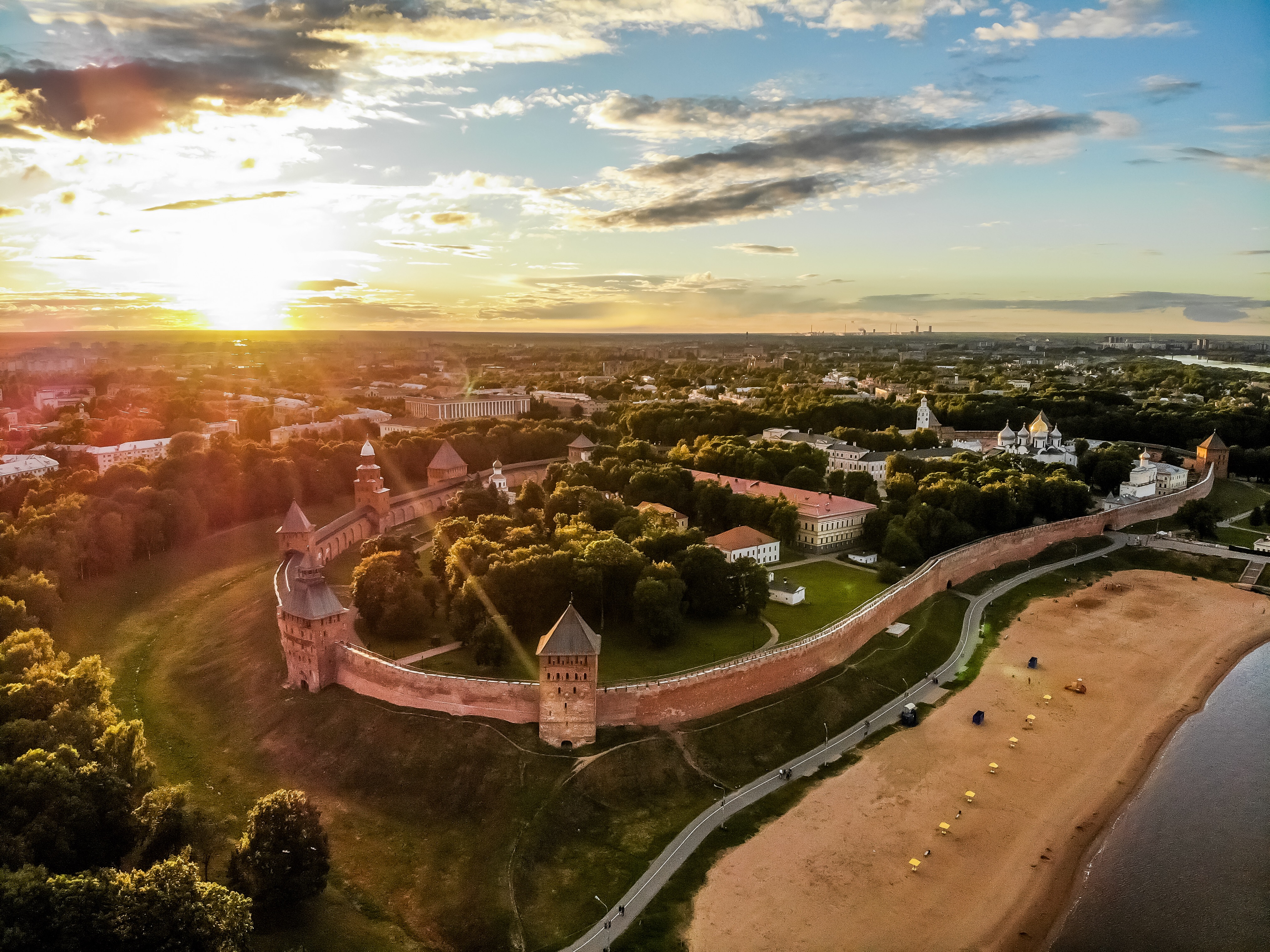
The Novgorod Detinets

The Nikon Chronicle, a late source, makes initial mention of the city under the year 859, in connection with the death of Novgorod's elder Gostomysl, while the copy of the Primary Chronicle found in the Laurentian Codex first mentions Novgorod under the year 862. The Charter of Veliky Novgorod recognises 859 as the year when the city was first mentioned and, therefore, the year it was founded. This date was proposed by the historian Mikhail Tikhomirov in 1959, when the city celebrated its 1,100th anniversary.

The original site of the city is thought to have been located at the source of the Volkhov River, where it flows from Lake Ilmen; Ryurikovo Gorodishche, located about a mile from the city centre, was founded sometime in the 9th century. By 930, the elite residences outside of the fort had merged at the present-day site of Veliky Novgorod. The reliably dated archaeological layers of Veliky Novgorod date no earlier than the 930s, and so the present-day site of the city is estimated to have emerged around the turn of the 9th and 10th centuries, or at the beginning of the 10th century.

The name Novgorod, which literally means 'new town', suggests that the city was preceded by an 'old town'. This 'old town' is often identified with Gorodishche; however, according to an alternative view, Gorodishche served as a princely pogost that controlled the area that later became the site of present-day Veliky Novgorod. The historian Valentin Yanin believed that Gorodishche was not separate from Novgorod but instead formed part of a larger, developing urban agglomeration. Novgorod therefore emerged through the merging of several kontsy ('ends'). The three original kontsy, or settlements, were Lyudin and Nerevsky on the left bank, and Slavensky on the right bank, followed by the emergence of Plotnitsky on the right bank in the 12th century and Zagorodsky on the left bank in the 13th century.

The Old Norse name Hólmgarðr is usually identified with the city. A wide range of explanations for the origin of the name have been proposed, including it referring to Ilmensky gorod (a town on Lake Ilmen), a town on an island (from hólmr, 'island'), settlements in the insularum regio (during the flood on the Volkhov), and Holm-gorod (a fortified settlement called Holm). Another possibility is that it referred to Gorodishche.

According to the Primary Chronicle, the Varangian chieftain Rurik was invited by the local tribes to rule over them in 862. The copy of the Primary Chronicle found in the Hypatian Codex says that Rurik first arrived at Ladoga before establishing himself at Novgorod. The prince of Novgorod continued to reside in Gorodishche until the late 15th century. These Varangians, known as the Rus', gave their name to the land and subsequently to Russia. As a result, Novgorod is traditionally viewed as the birthplace of the Russian monarchy in Russian historiography and a cradle of Russian statehood.

=== Kievan period ===
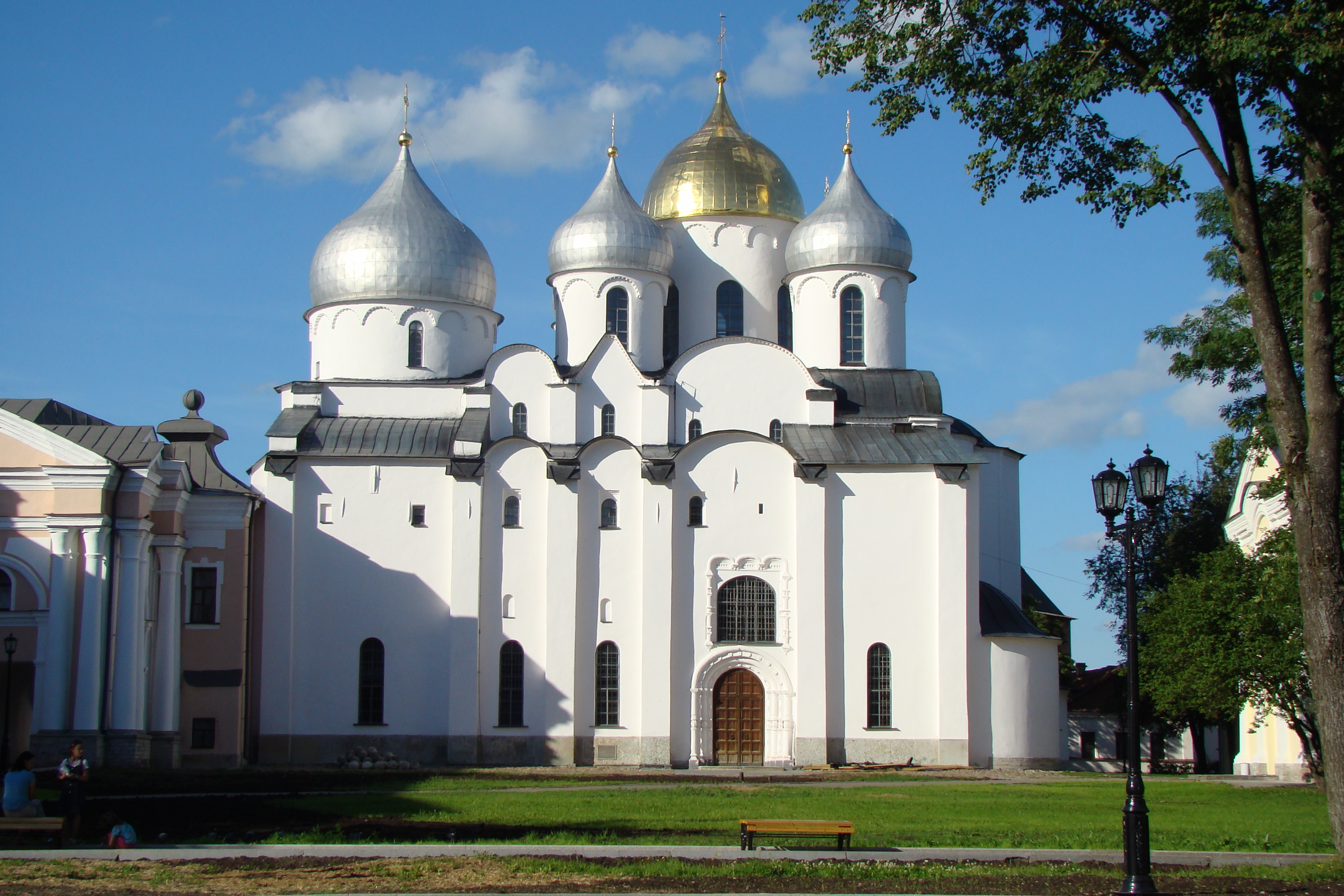
The Cathedral of Saint Sophia, built in the 11th century, is a symbol of the city

According to the Primary Chronicle, Rurik's successor Oleg conquered Kiev in 882 and laid the foundations for the state of Kievan Rus'. Nevertheless, most Greek and Latin sources continued to mention Novgorod as the political centre for the next century, until it was eclipsed by Kiev. Following military campaigns in 947, the territories between the valleys of the Luga River in the west and the Msta River in the east were incorporated into the Novgorodian land. Around this time, as a result of increased urban revenues, a street-based layout of estates emerged and mandatory street paving was introduced. In addition, the Novgorod Detinets was built and served as the city's main fortification. The name Novgorod was initially given to the detinets (or kremlin) and subsequently extended to the rest of the territory of the city.

Novgorod's size, as well as its political, economic, and cultural influence, made it the second-most important city in Kievan Rus'. As it lay at the junction of multiple trade routes, particularly the route from the Varangians to the Greeks, Novgorod quickly developed as a centre of trade, crafts, and culture. According to custom, the eldest son and heir of the ruling Kievan prince was sent to rule in Novgorod, even when he was a minor. When the ruling monarch had no such son, Novgorod was governed by posadniki, or representatives of the prince, such as Dobrynya, Konstantin, and Ostromir.

By the end of the 10th century, the Novgorodians had been baptised during the reign of Vladimir the Great. Novgorod received its first bishop in 989 (elevated to archiepiscopal status in 1165). Yaroslav the Wise served as the prince of Novgorod from 1010 to 1019, while his father, Vladimir, ruled in Kiev. Yaroslav granted significant privileges to Novgorodian boyars, or nobles, after they supported him in seizing the Kievan throne in 1019. Yaroslav promulgated the first written code of laws, later incorporated into the Russkaya Pravda; historians generally believe that Yaroslav wrote a law that was connected to Novgorod's support in his war against his half-brother, Sviatopolk. The beginning of widespread literacy in Novgorod is also dated to Yaroslav's reign, as he ordered 300 Novgorodian children from boyar and priestly families to be taught. As a result, from the 11th century, Novgorod was one of the largest centres of chronicle writing. Yaroslav's son, Vladimir, sponsored the construction of the great Saint Sophia Cathedral, which stands to this day.

In Norse sagas, the city is mentioned as the capital of Garðaríki. Many Viking leaders came to Novgorod seeking refuge or employment, including the Norwegian kings Olaf Tryggvason, Olaf Haraldsson, Magnus Olafsson, and Harald Hardrada. Following the death and canonisation of Olaf Haraldsson, the Novgorodians built Saint Olaf's Church in his memory.

=== Republican period ===
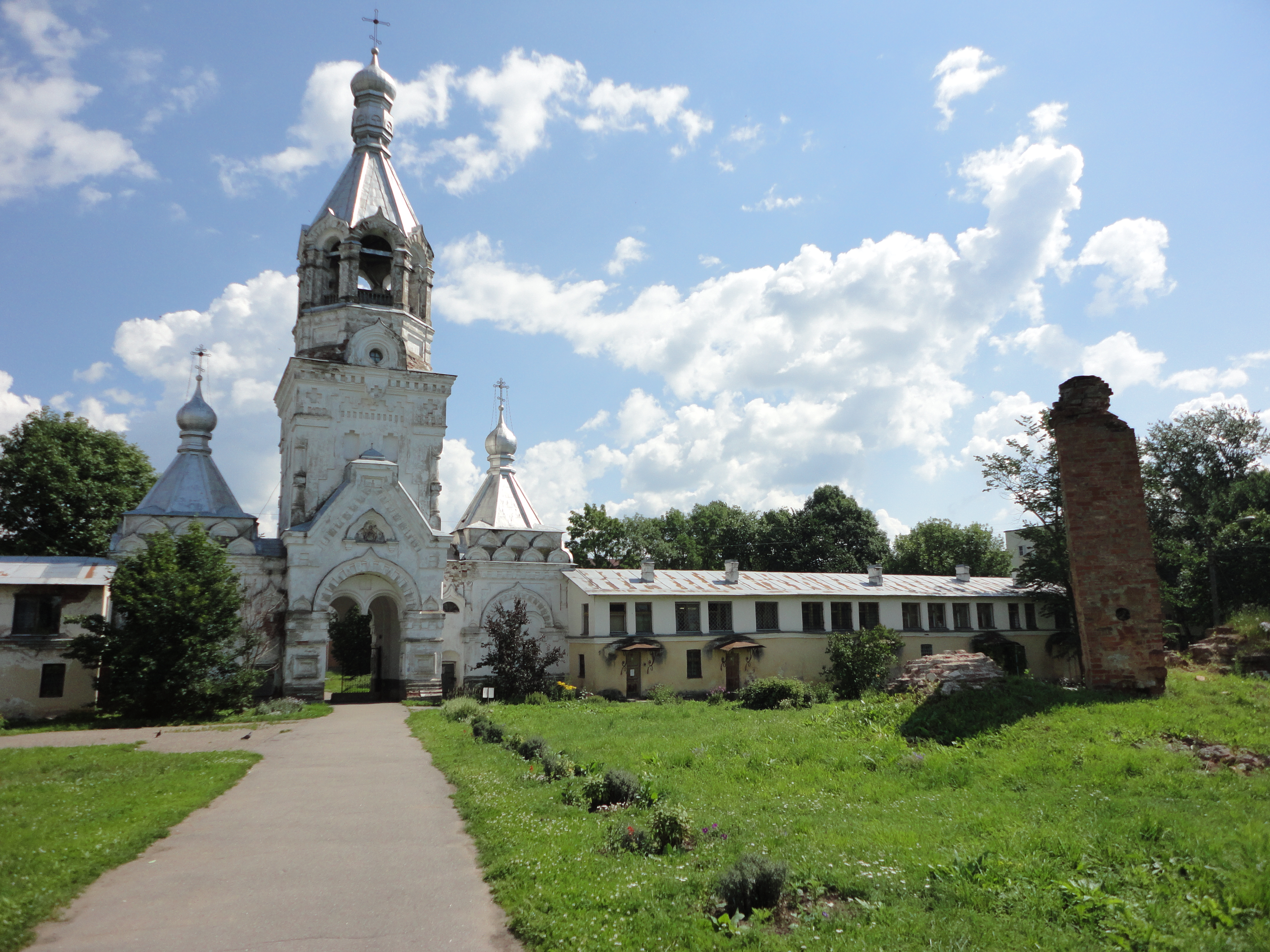
The Monastery of the Tithes is one of eight ancient monasteries of the Novgorod Republic

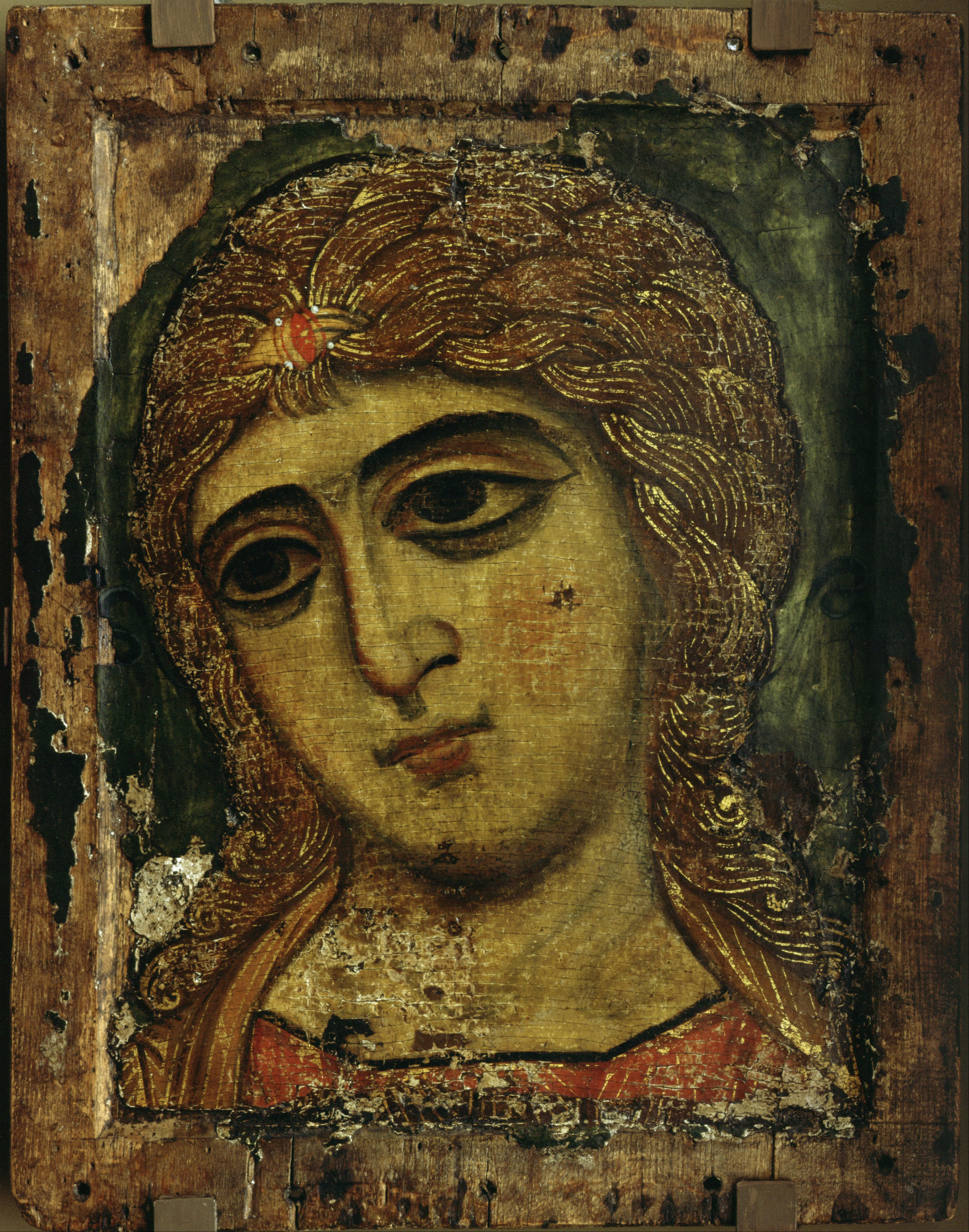
The Angel with Golden Hair, 12th-century icon

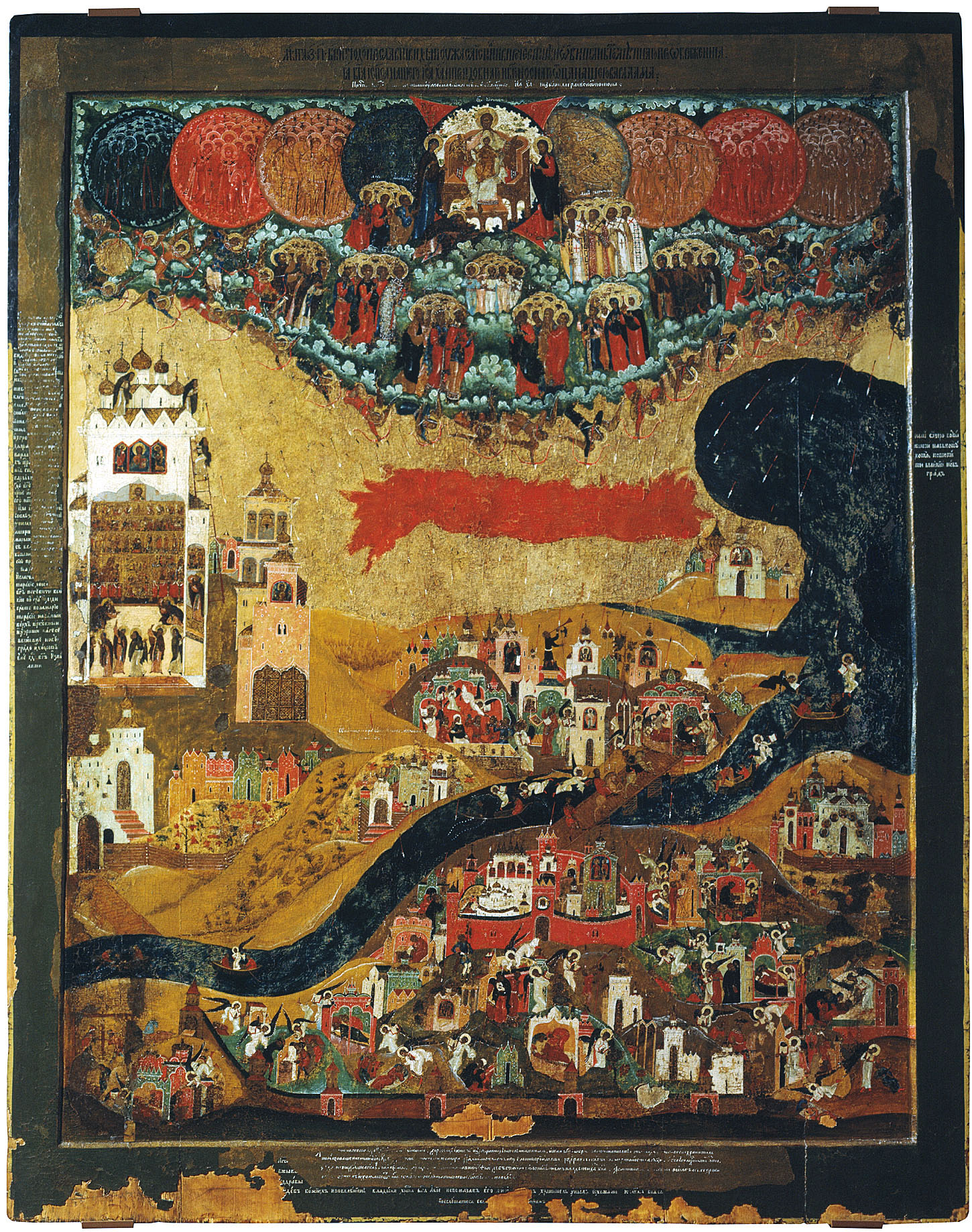
The Vision of Tarasius, 16th-century icon. It depicts Novgorod with the Sofia side to the left and the commercial side to the right. The inhabitants of the city are shown doing their day-to-day work while being guarded by the angels

From 1136 to 1478, Novgorod was the centre of a separate political and administrative entity known as the Novgorod Republic. The Novgorodians dismissed their prince, Vsevolod Mstislavich, in 1136, and this year is traditionally taken as the beginning of the republican period, although the development of republican institutions in Novgorod was a much more complicated process that began earlier and ended much later. Novgorod was effectively a city-state dominated by a small group of wealthy merchant and noble families; although such city-states were common in Western Europe, this system was unique in Russia, where princes typically held supreme authority. Novgorod was the largest Russian state until it was surpassed by Moscow in the 15th century. It controlled much of the Russian North, with its hinterland stretching from the Gulf of Finland in the west to the Ural Mountains in the east.

The city was able to appoint and dismiss a number of princes over the next two centuries, but the princely office was never abolished, and powerful princes, such as Alexander Nevsky, could assert their will in the city regardless of the wishes of the Novgorodians and usually independently of any boyar group that was dominant at the time. One of the most important local figures in Novgorod was the posadnik, or mayor, an official elected by the veche (popular assembly) from among the city's boyars, or aristocracy. From the end of the 13th century, the posadnik was limited to one-year appointments, and from 1354, each of the five kontsy of Novgorod had their own posadnik, along with the stepenny (acting) posadnik. The number of posadniki increased again in the 15th century. By the end, there were 36 posadniki, while the term of office was reduced to six months. The tysyatsky, or chiliarch, originally the head of the Novgorodian militia but later a commercial and judicial official, was also elected by the veche. Another important local official was the archbishop, who shared power with the boyars. The archbishop was elected by the veche or chosen by lot, and, after being chosen, was sent to the metropolitan of the Russian Orthodox Church for consecration.

While a basic outline of the various officials and the veche can be drawn up, the city-state's exact political constitution remains unknown. In theory, supreme power belonged to the veche. The boyars and the archbishop ruled the city together, although where one official's power ended and another's began is uncertain. The prince, although his power was greatly diminished from the 13th century, was represented by his namestnik, or lieutenant, and still played important roles as a military commander, legislator and jurist. The exact composition of the veche, too, is uncertain, with some historians, such as Vasily Klyuchevsky, claiming it was democratic in nature, while later scholars, such as Valentin Yanin and Aleksandr Khoroshev, see it as a "sham democracy" controlled by the ruling elite. It has also been characterised as an oligarchy.

The merchants of the Hanseatic League were particularly attracted to Russian trade because of its vast resources of furs and beeswax, with Novgorod serving as the leading supplier of furs. The easternmost kontor, or trading post, of the Hanseatic League was located in Novgorod and known as the Peterhof, through which enormous quantities of luxury (sable, ermine, fox, marmot) and non-luxury furs (squirrel pelts) were traded. The Peterhof was established in the late 12th or early 13th century by merchants from northern Germany. Prior to the establishment of the Hanseatic League, traders from Gotland arrived and founded the Gothic court around the turn of the 12th century. German merchants came in substantial numbers; around 200 German merchants resided in the trading city in the 1430s, accounting for about 1% of Novgorod's total population. A merchant association known as Ivan's Hundred operated in Novgorod from the 12th century.

Throughout the Middle Ages, the city was also one of the most important centres of Russian art and culture. Approximately 1,000 birch bark manuscripts dating from the 11th–15th centuries have been unearthed in excavations. Most of these documents are letters written by laypeople in a local dialect, Old Novgorodian. As a result, it has been suggested that there was widespread literacy among large segments of urban society in medieval Russia; according to one estimate, 20% of the urban male population in Russian city-states were literate around the mid-13th century. It was also in Novgorod that the Novgorod Codex, the oldest East Slavic book, and birch bark letter no. 292, the oldest inscription in a Finnic language, were unearthed. Some of the oldest Russian chronicles, such as the Novgorod First Chronicle, were written in the scriptoria of the archbishops, who also promoted iconography and patronised church construction. The Novgorodian merchant Sadko appears as a hero in Russian folklore.

Novgorod never fell during the Mongol conquests, although it was forced to pay tribute. The Mongol invasions coincided with the reign of Alexander Nevsky, who was involved in protecting Novgorodian interests. He is best known for defeating the Swedes at the 1240 Battle of the Neva and the German crusaders at the 1242 Battle of the Ice. In 1259, Mongol tax collectors and census takers arrived in the city, leading to political disturbances and forcing Alexander Nevsky to punish a number of city officials. As a result of his efforts at mediation, local nobles began to oversee tax collection directly. From the mid-13th century, the throne of Novgorod was held by the grand prince of Vladimir and subsequently the grand prince of Moscow, who inherited the Grand Principality of Vladimir. Novgorod recognised the grand prince's sovereignty over the city until it lost its independence. From the end of the 14th century, the city was known as Sovereign Lord Novgorod the Great, a title equivalent to that of Moscow's Sovereign Lord Grand Prince. At its peak around that time, Novgorod had an estimated population of about 20,000 to 30,000.

In the 15th century, Novgorod faced significant food shortages. As a result, it was dependent on the Russian lands to its southwest for imports such as grain. Although Novgorod traditionally recognised the authority of the Russian grand princes, relations with Moscow deteriorated over issues of autonomy. Some Novgorodians favoured close ties with Moscow due to its position as the centre of Russian Orthodoxy, in contrast to Lithuania, where Catholicism was dominant. However, some Novgorodian clergy adopted a pro-Lithuanian policy for political reasons, fearing that embracing the grand prince of Moscow would eventually lead to the end of Novgorod's independence.

Grand Prince Ivan III (r. 1462–1505) began the process of annexing the other Russian principalities. He defeated the Novgorodian militia at the Battle of Shelon, but its republican institutions remained intact until 1478, when he imposed his direct rule on the city. Novgorod was then formally annexed into the Muscovite state; the veche was dismantled, the posadnichestvo (mayoralty) was abolished, and the local government was replaced by the grand prince's governor, or namestnik. The Hanseatic kontor was closed in 1494, and although it was briefly reopened in 1514, the Hanseatic League never regained its former monopoly.

=== Muscovite period ===
At the time of its incorporation into the centralised Russian state, Novgorod was one of its largest cities. In 1546, Novgorod was the third-largest city in Russia by number of households, after Moscow and Pskov. The English explorer Richard Chancellor wrote: "The great wealth of flax and hemp indisputably ensures Novgorod a place of pre-eminence before all other Russian cities." Novgorod retained this position until it was sacked by the oprichniki under Ivan IV in 1570. The population of the Novgorodian land declined significantly, although this was mainly due to famine and plague. Estimates of the massacre's death toll vary greatly; the historian Ruslan Skrynnikov concluded that 2,170–2,180 deaths were recorded, but cautioned that this figure could not be considered final.

The last decade of the 16th century was a comparatively favourable period for the city as Boris Godunov restored trade privileges and raised the status of the archbishop of Novgorod to that of metropolitan. The German trading post was re-established in 1603. Even after its incorporation into the centralised state, the Novgorodian land retained its distinct identity and institutions, including its own customs policy and administrative divisions. Certain elective offices were quickly restored after having been abolished by Ivan III. Local political life continued the traditions of the republic in many ways.

During the Time of Troubles, after Tsar Vasily Shuisky was deposed and the Seven Boyars elected Władysław IV of Poland as tsar of all Russia, the Russian state began to collapse into its constituent parts. Swedish forces led by Jacob De la Gardie stormed the city and occupied it from 1611 to 1617, following the signing of the Treaty of Stolbovo, which ended the Russo-Swedish War. The population fell significantly during the occupation, with the number of homesteads in the city decreasing from 1,158 in 1607 to only 493 in 1617; the Sofia side was described as "deserted". Novgorod regained a measure of its former prosperity only towards the end of the 17th century, when such ambitious buildings as the Cathedral of the Sign and the Vyazhischi Monastery were constructed. Patriarch Nikon was active in Novgorod between 1648 and 1652. The Novgorodian land became one of the Old Believers' strongholds following the Schism of the Russian Church. The city remained an important trade centre, even though it was now eclipsed by Arkhangelsk, and Novgorodian merchants continued to trade in Baltic cities and Stockholm, while Swedish merchants came to Novgorod and maintained their own trading post from 1627. Novgorod continued to be a major centre of crafts, which employed the majority of its population; more than 200 professions were represented in the city in the 16th century. Bells, cannons and other arms were produced in Novgorod; its silversmiths were famous for the skan' technique used for religious items and jewellery. Novgorodian chests were in widespread use all across Russia, including in the tsar's household and the northern monasteries.

=== Imperial period ===
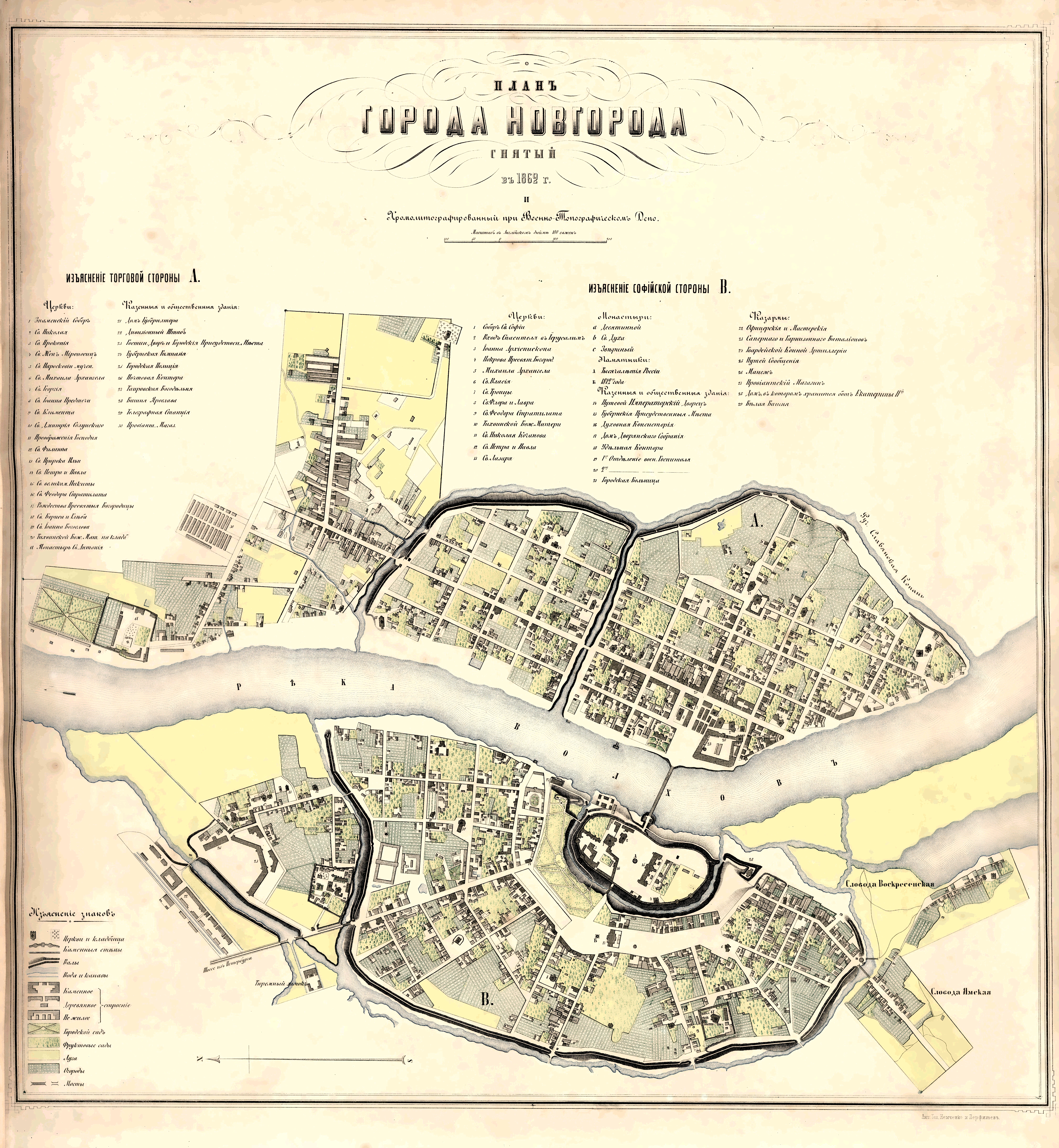
City plan of Novgorod in 1862

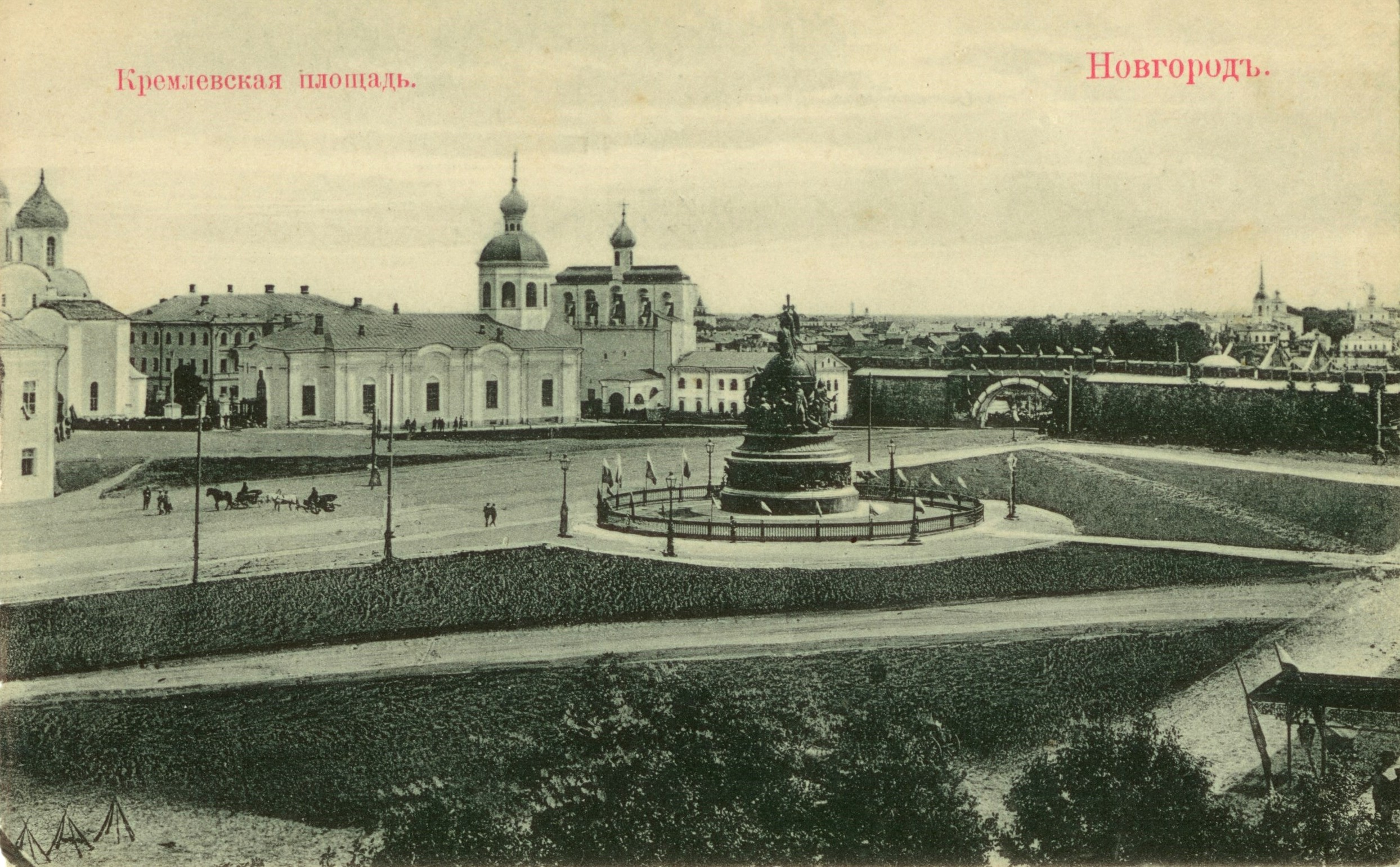
Kremlin square in an early 20th-century postcard

Novgorod's population grew significantly by the mid-17th century. However, the founding of St. Petersburg and the transfer of the capital there in 1712 led to the city losing its economic and commercial importance. In 1727, Novgorod became the administrative centre of Novgorod Governorate within the Russian Empire, which was detached from Saint Petersburg Governorate during the administrative reform of 1727–1728. From 1776 to 1796, the governorate was known as the Novgorod Viceroyalty.

=== Soviet period ===
From 1927 to 1944, the city was a part of Leningrad Oblast. In 1944, it became the administrative centre of the newly formed Novgorod Oblast.

On 19 August 1941, during World War II, the city was occupied by the German Army. The Red Army liberated the city on 20 January 1944, by units of the Volkhov Front during the Leningrad–Novgorod Offensive. A 1944 report on conditions in the city noted that out of 2,346 residential buildings, only 40 remained unscathed. All of the city's hospitals, schools, libraries, and museums, as well as its industry, waterworks, and power plants, had been destroyed. Its historic monuments were systematically obliterated, with 65 architectural monuments either destroyed or badly damaged, and many others severely dilapidated. The historian Dmitry Likhachev stated:

[Novgorod] was covered by a deafening silence. A dead silence stopped my ears. It seemed to me that I was not only deaf, but blind as well. I no longer saw the town once so familiar to me. Under the tragically large sky there was just a flat plain, overgrown with high grass. It was a graveyard without headstones! Here and there, there was the odd remnant of an ancient church. Their thick walls were deeply wounded, but they had survived, stood their ground. The churches and monasteries in the wide ring surrounding Novgorod were not so lucky—they had been flattened on the battlefield. Volotovo, Kovalevo, Skovorodka—so many names familiar to the art historian. All had perished!

In 1945, it was included in the list of 15 cities subject to priority restoration by decree of the Council of People's Commissars. The city was rebuilt according to the plans laid down by Alexey Shchusev in 1943–1945 (and subsequently the Giprogor Institute in 1966). As the result, the modern city has preserved many of its historical monuments.

=== Post-Soviet period ===
In 1992, the chief monuments of the city and the surrounding area were inscribed on the UNESCO World Heritage Site list as the Historic Monuments of Novgorod and Surroundings.

In 1999, the city was officially renamed Veliky Novgorod (Great Novgorod). In 2008, it was given the title of City of Military Glory.

As of 2025, regular archeological rescue work continues across the site. Veliky Novgorod is a unique archaeological site and systemic research has been conducted since 1932; the Novgorod archaeological expedition was led by Artemiy Artsikhovsky and Valentin Yanin.

== Administrative and municipal status ==
Veliky Novgorod is the administrative centre of the oblast and, within the framework of administrative divisions, it also serves as the administrative centre of Novgorodsky District, even though it is not a part of it. As an administrative division, it is incorporated separately as the city of oblast significance of Veliky Novgorod—an administrative unit with status equal to that of the districts. As a municipal division, the city of oblast significance of Veliky Novgorod is incorporated as Veliky Novgorod Urban Okrug.

== Sights ==
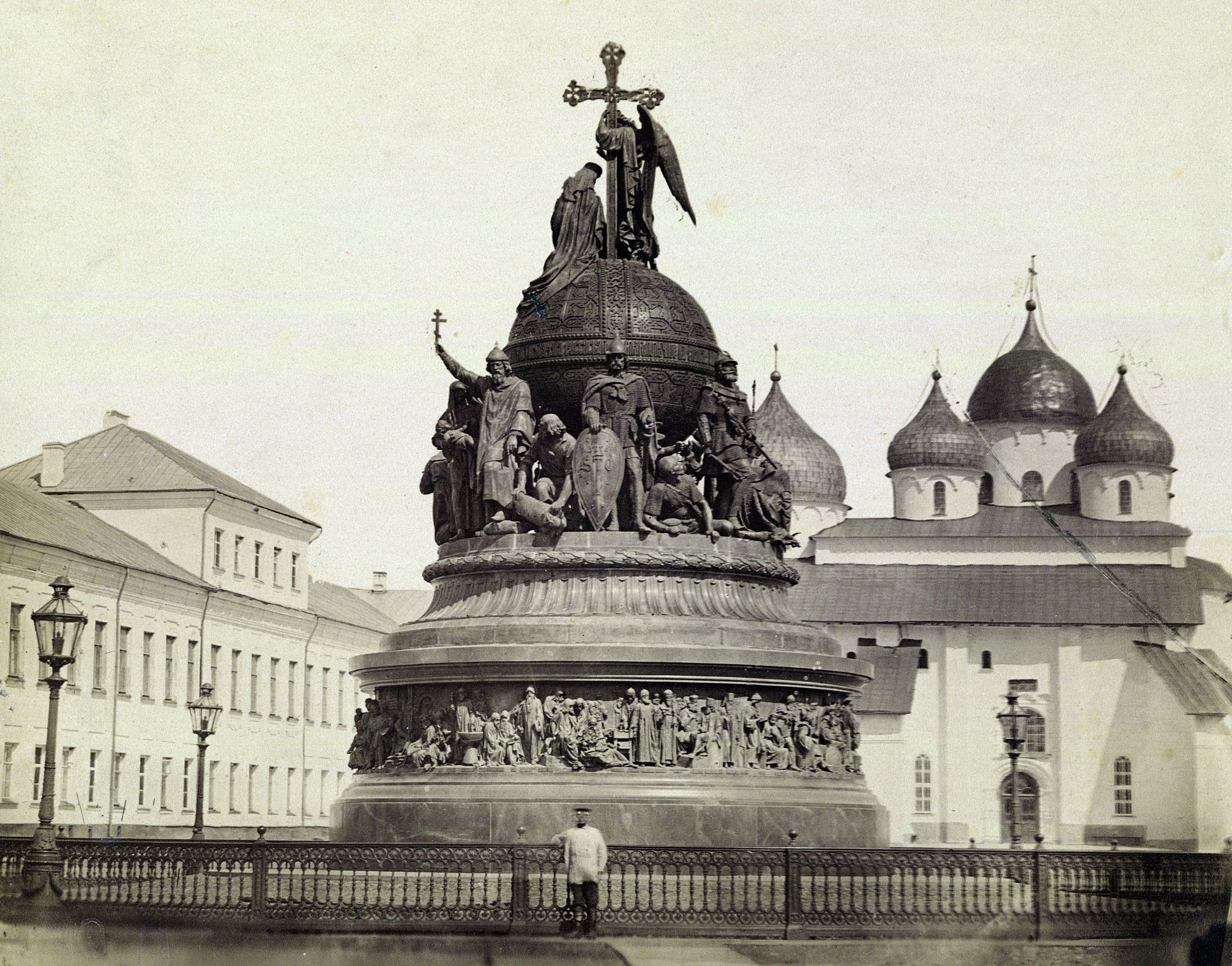
The Millennium of Russia monument (1862), with Saint Sophia Cathedral in the background. The upper row of figures is cast in the round and the lower one is in relief.

The city is known for the variety and age of its medieval monuments. The foremost among these is the Saint Sophia Cathedral, built between 1045 and 1050 under the patronage of Vladimir Yaroslavich, the son of Yaroslav the Wise; Vladimir and his mother, Anna Porphyrogenita, are buried in the cathedral. It is one of the best preserved churches from the 11th century. It is also probably the oldest structure still in use in Russia and the first one to represent original features of Russian architecture (austere stone walls, five helmet-like domes). Its frescoes were painted in the 12th century originally on the orders of Bishop Nikita (died 1108) (the "porches" or side chapels were painted in 1144 under Archbishop Nifont) and renovated several times over the centuries, most recently in the 19th century. The cathedral features famous bronze gates, which now hang in the west entrance, allegedly made in Magdeburg in 1156 (other sources see them originating from Płock in Poland) and reportedly snatched by Novgorodians from the Swedish town of Sigtuna in 1187. More recent scholarship has determined that the gates were most likely purchased in the mid-15th century, apparently at the behest of Archbishop Euthymius II (1429–1458), a lover of Western art and architectural styles.

The Novgorod Kremlin, traditionally known as the Detinets, also contains the oldest palace in Russia (the so-called Chamber of the Facets, 1433), which served as the main meeting hall of the archbishops; the oldest Russian bell tower (mid-15th century), and the oldest Russian clock tower (1673). The Palace of Facets, the bell tower, and the clock tower were originally built on the orders of Archbishop Euphimius II, although the clock tower collapsed in the 17th century and had to be rebuilt and much of the palace of Euphimius II is no longer standing. Among later structures, the most remarkable are a royal palace (1771) and a bronze monument to the Millennium of Russia, representing the most important figures from the country's history (unveiled in 1862).

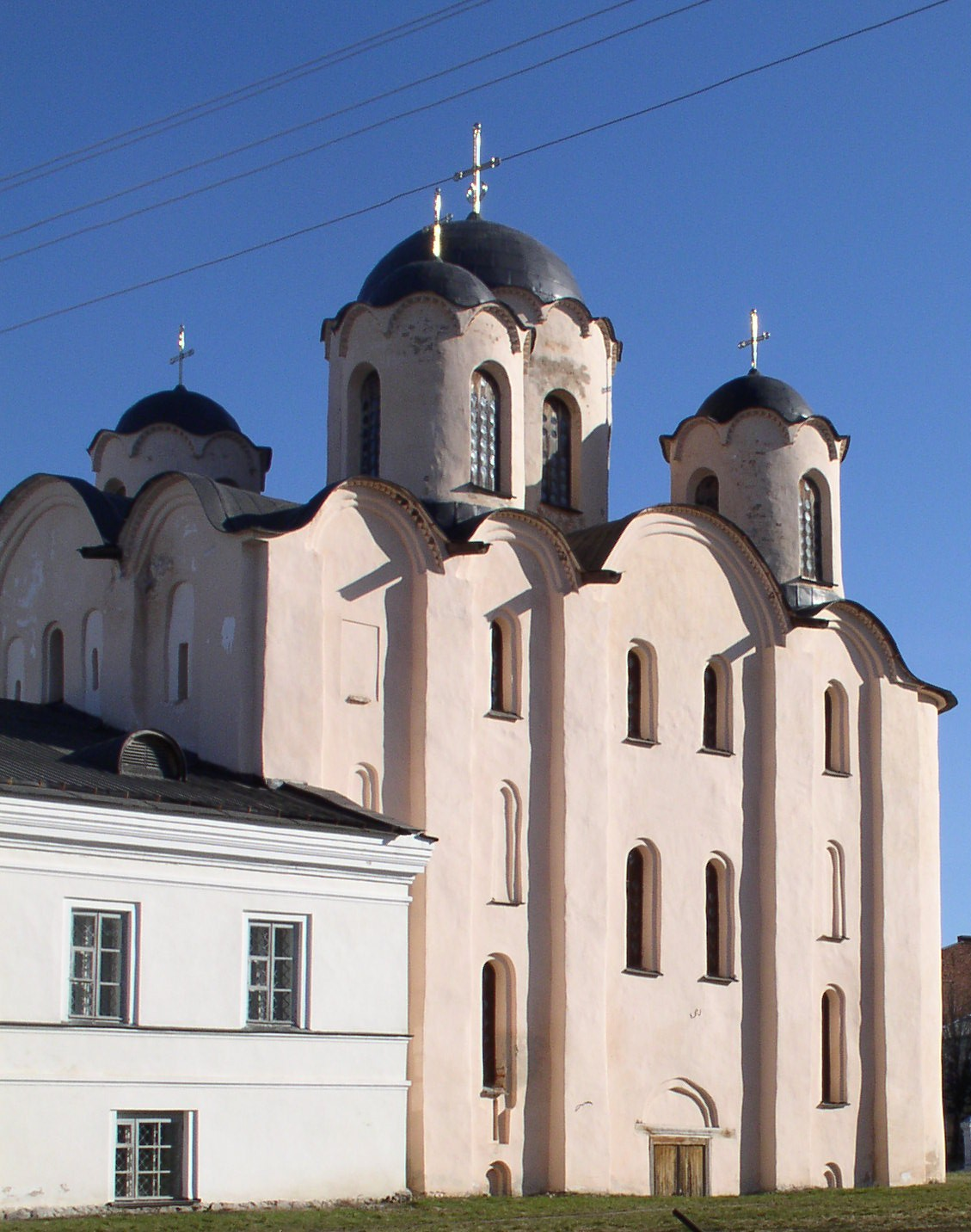
St. Nicholas Cathedral, built by Mstislav I near his palace at Yaroslav's Court, Novgorod, contains 12th-century frescoes depicting his illustrious family

Outside the Kremlin walls, there are three large churches constructed during the reign of Mstislav the Great. St. Nicholas Cathedral (1113–1123), containing frescoes of Mstislav's family, graces Yaroslav's Court (formerly the chief square of Novgorod). The Yuriev Monastery (one of the oldest in Russia, 1030) contains a tall, three-domed cathedral from 1119 (built by Mstislav's son, Vsevolod, and Kyurik, the head of the monastery). A similar three-domed cathedral (1117), probably designed by the same masters, stands in the Antoniev Monastery, built on the orders of Antony, the founder of that monastery.

There are now some fifty medieval and early modern churches scattered throughout the city and its surrounding areas. Some of them were blown up by the Nazis and subsequently restored. The most ancient pattern is represented by those dedicated to Saints Pyotr and Pavel (on the Swallow's Hill, 1185–1192), to Annunciation (in Myachino, 1179), to Assumption (on Volotovo Field, 1180s) and to St. Paraskeva-Piatnitsa (at Yaroslav's Court, 1207). The greatest masterpiece of early Novgorod architecture is the Savior church at Nereditsa (1198).

In the 13th century, tiny churches of the three-paddled design were in vogue. These are represented by a small chapel at the Peryn Monastery (1230s) and St. Nicholas' on the Lipnya Islet (1292, also notable for its 14th-century frescoes). The next century saw the development of two original church designs, one of them culminating in St Theodor's church (1360–1361, fine frescoes from 1380s), and another one leading to the Savior church on Ilyina street (1374, painted in 1378 by Feofan Grek). The Savior' church in Kovalevo (1345) was originally frescoed by Serbian masters, but the church was destroyed during the war. While the church has since been rebuilt, the frescoes have not been restored.

During the last century of the republican government, some new churches were consecrated to Saints Peter and Paul (on Slavna, 1367; in Kozhevniki, 1406), to Christ's Nativity (at the Cemetery, 1387), to St. John the Apostle's (1384), to the Twelve Apostles (1455), to St Demetrius (1467), to St. Simeon (1462), and other saints. Generally, they are not thought to be as innovative as the churches from the previous period. Several shrines from the 12th century (i.e., in Opoki) were demolished brick by brick and then reconstructed exactly as they used to be, several of them in the mid-15th century, again under Archbishop Yevfimy II (Euthymius II), perhaps one of the greatest patrons of architecture in medieval Novgorod.

Novgorod's conquest by Ivan III in 1478 decisively changed the character of local architecture. Large commissions were thenceforth executed by Muscovite masters and patterned after cathedrals of Moscow Kremlin: e.g., the Savior Cathedral of Khutyn Monastery (1515), the Cathedral of the Mother of God of the Sign (1688), the St. Nicholas Cathedral of Vyaschizhy Monastery (1685). Nevertheless, the styles of some parochial churches were still in keeping with local traditions: e.g., the churches of Myrrh-bearing Women (1510) and of Saints Boris and Gleb (1586).

In Vitoslavlitsy, along the Volkhov River and the Myachino Lake, close to the Yuriev Monastery, a museum of wooden architecture was established in 1964. Over twenty wooden buildings (churches, houses and mills) dating from the 14th to the 19th century were transported there from all around the Novgorod region.

11,400 graves of the German 1st Luftwaffe Field Division are found at the war cemetery in Novgorod, and 1,900 soldiers of the Spanish Blue Division are buried there.

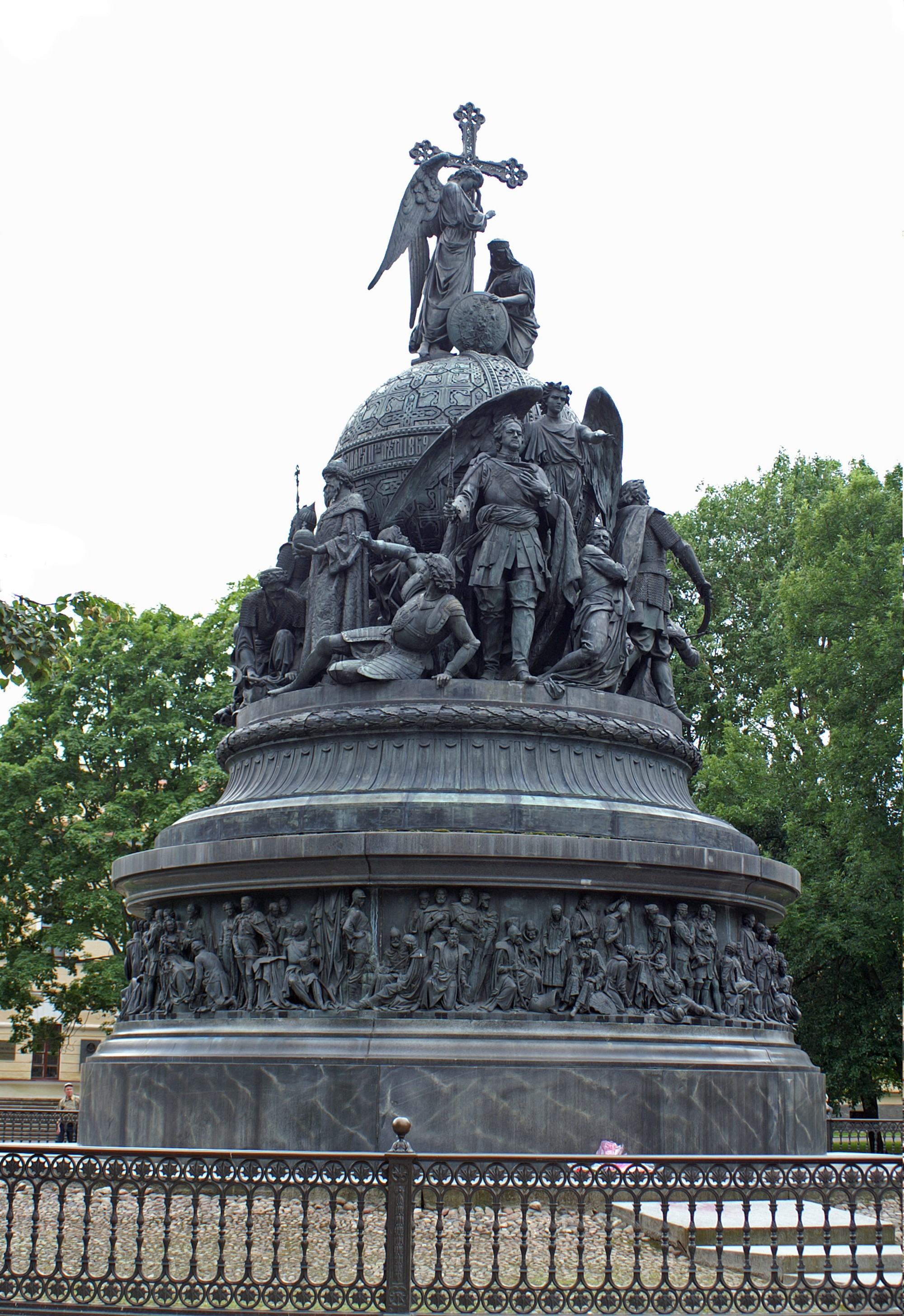
Bronze monument to the Millennium of Russia (1862)

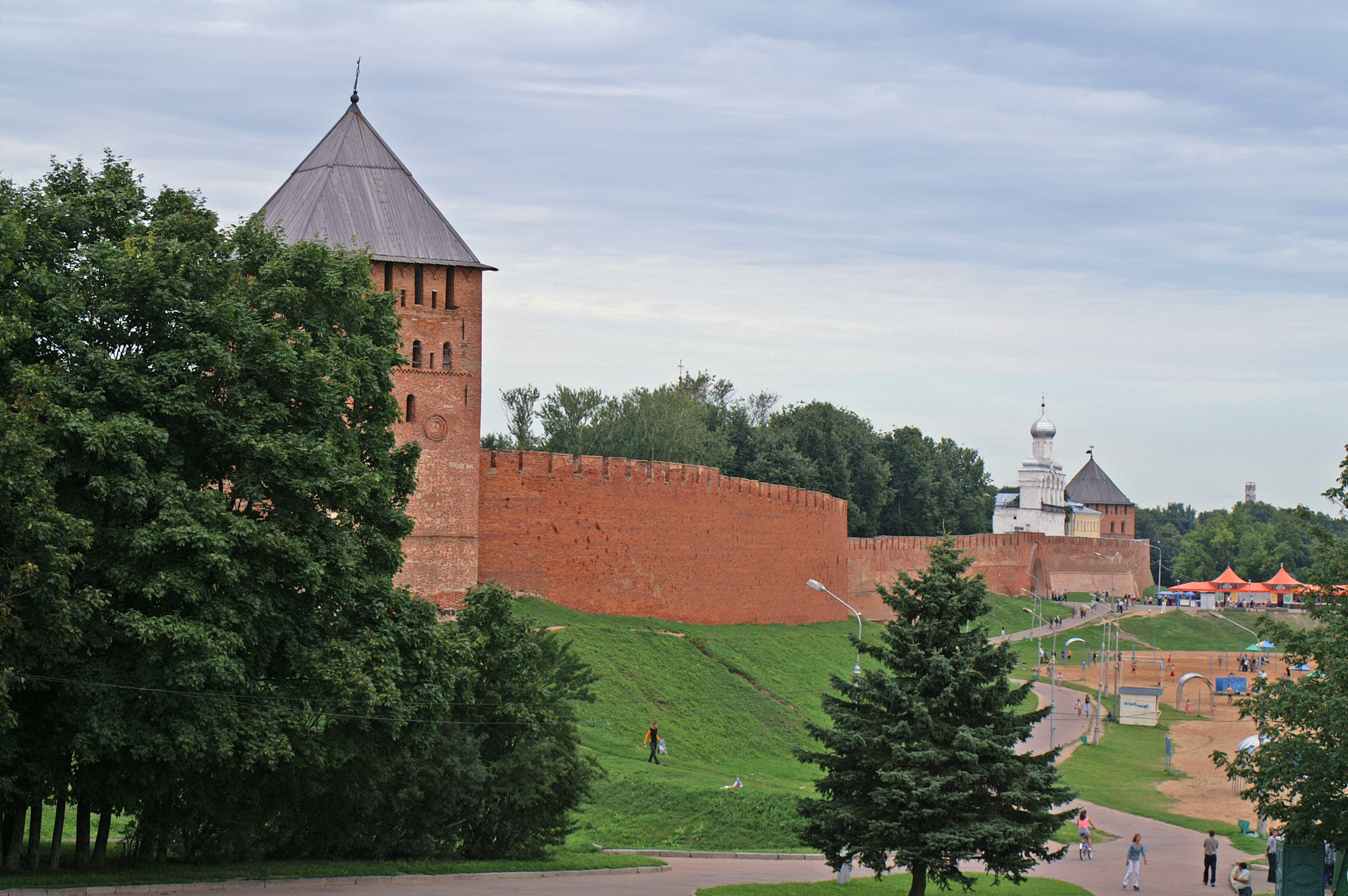
Walls of the Novgorod Kremlin

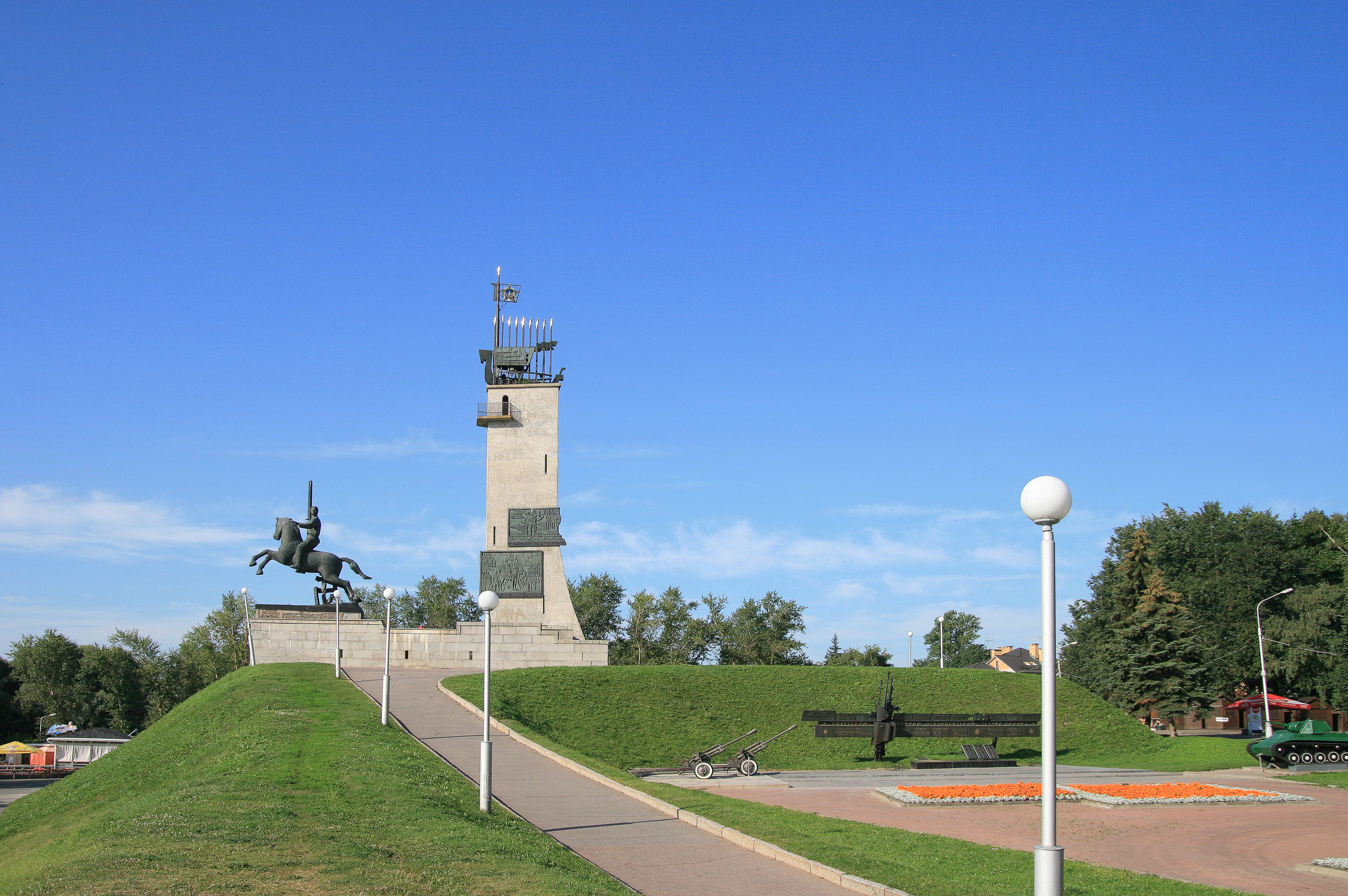
War Memorial

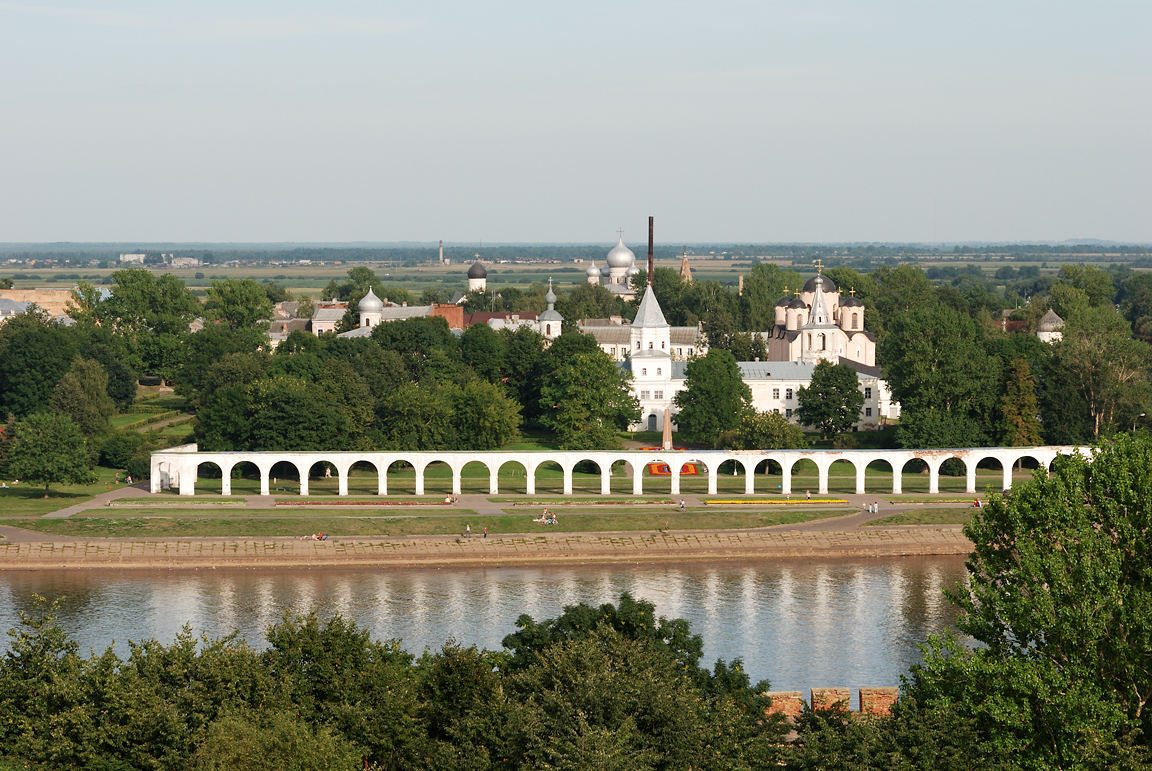
View of the Yaroslav's Court

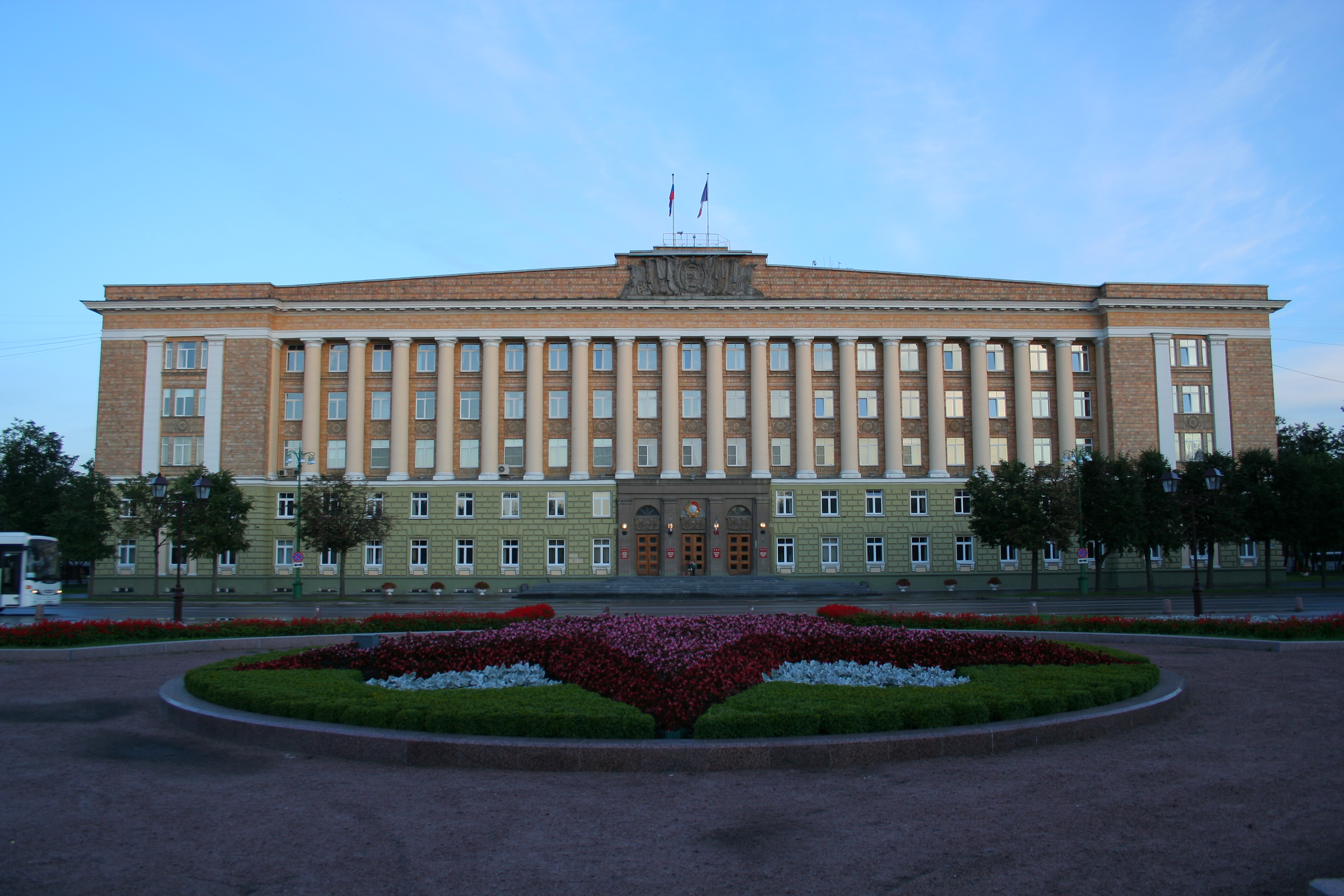
Government Building

== Transportation ==
=== Intercity transport ===
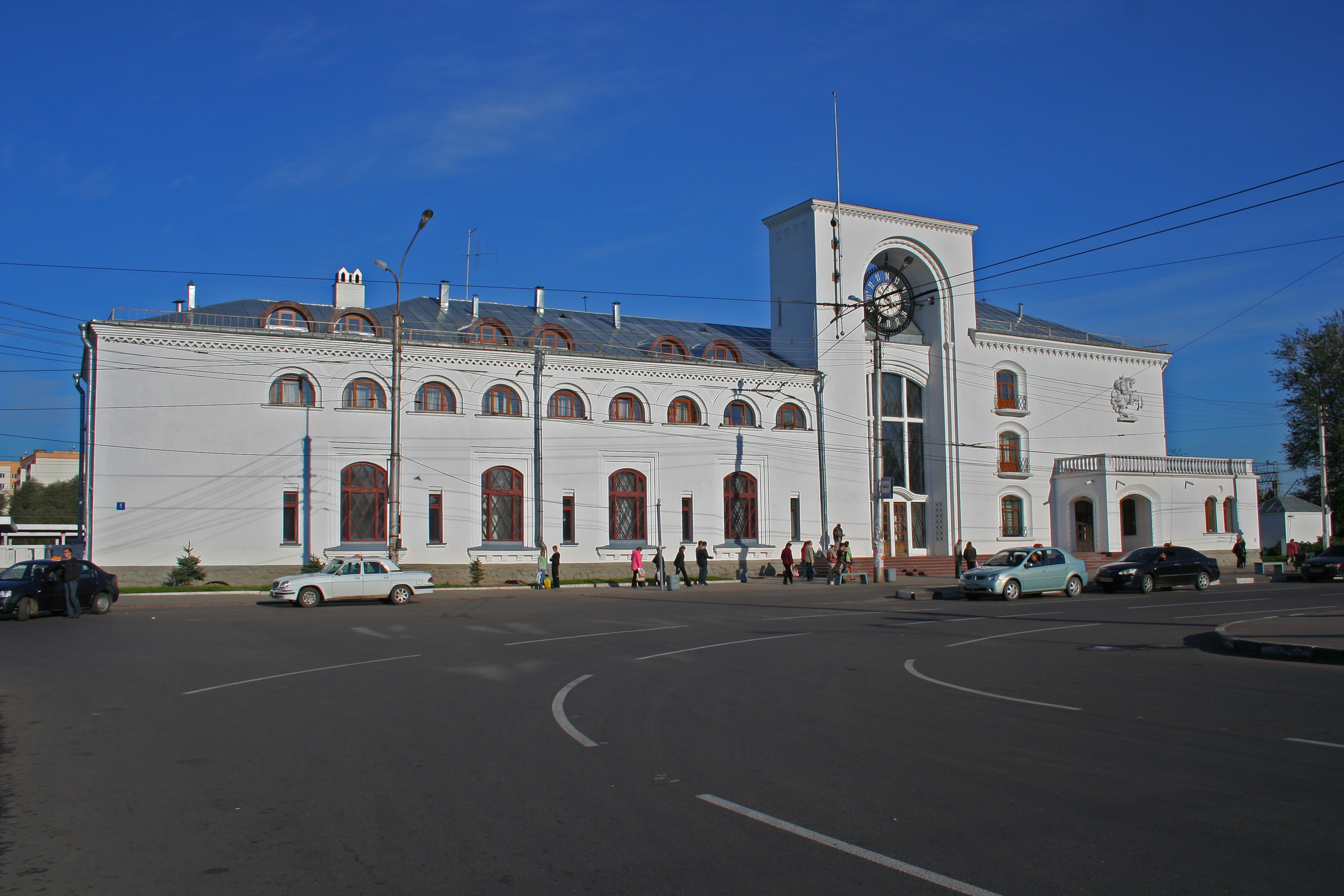
Novgorod main railway station, built in 1953

Novgorod has connections to Moscow (531 km) and St. Petersburg (189 km) by the federal highway M10. There are public buses to Saint Petersburg and other destinations.

The city has direct railway passenger connections with Moscow (Leningradsky Rail Terminal, by night trains), St. Petersburg (Moscow Rail Terminal and Vitebsk Rail Terminal, by suburban trains), Minsk (Belarus) (Minsk Passazhirsky railway station, by night trains) and Murmansk.

The city's former commercial airport Yurievo was decommissioned in 2006, and the area has now been redeveloped into a residential neighbourhood. The still existing Krechevitsy Airport does not serve any regular flights since mid-1990s although there is a plan to turn Krechevitsy into a new operational airport by 2025. The nearest international airport is St. Petersburg's Pulkovo, some 180 kilometres (112 miles) north of the city.

=== Local transportation ===
Veliky Novgorod trolleybus map (2021)

Local transportation consists of a network of buses and trolleybuses. The trolleybus network, which currently consists of five routes, started operating in 1995 and is the first trolley system opened in Russia after the fall of the Soviet Union.

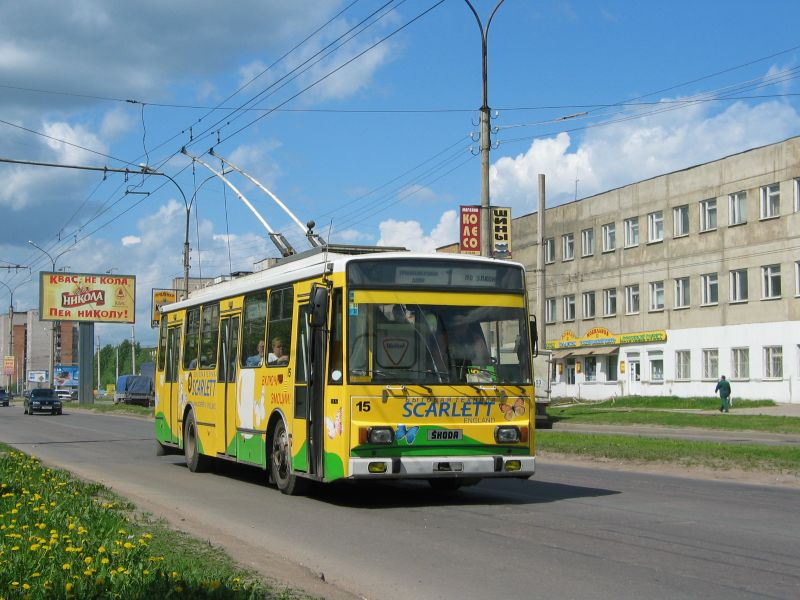
Trolleybus Skoda-VMZ-14Tr

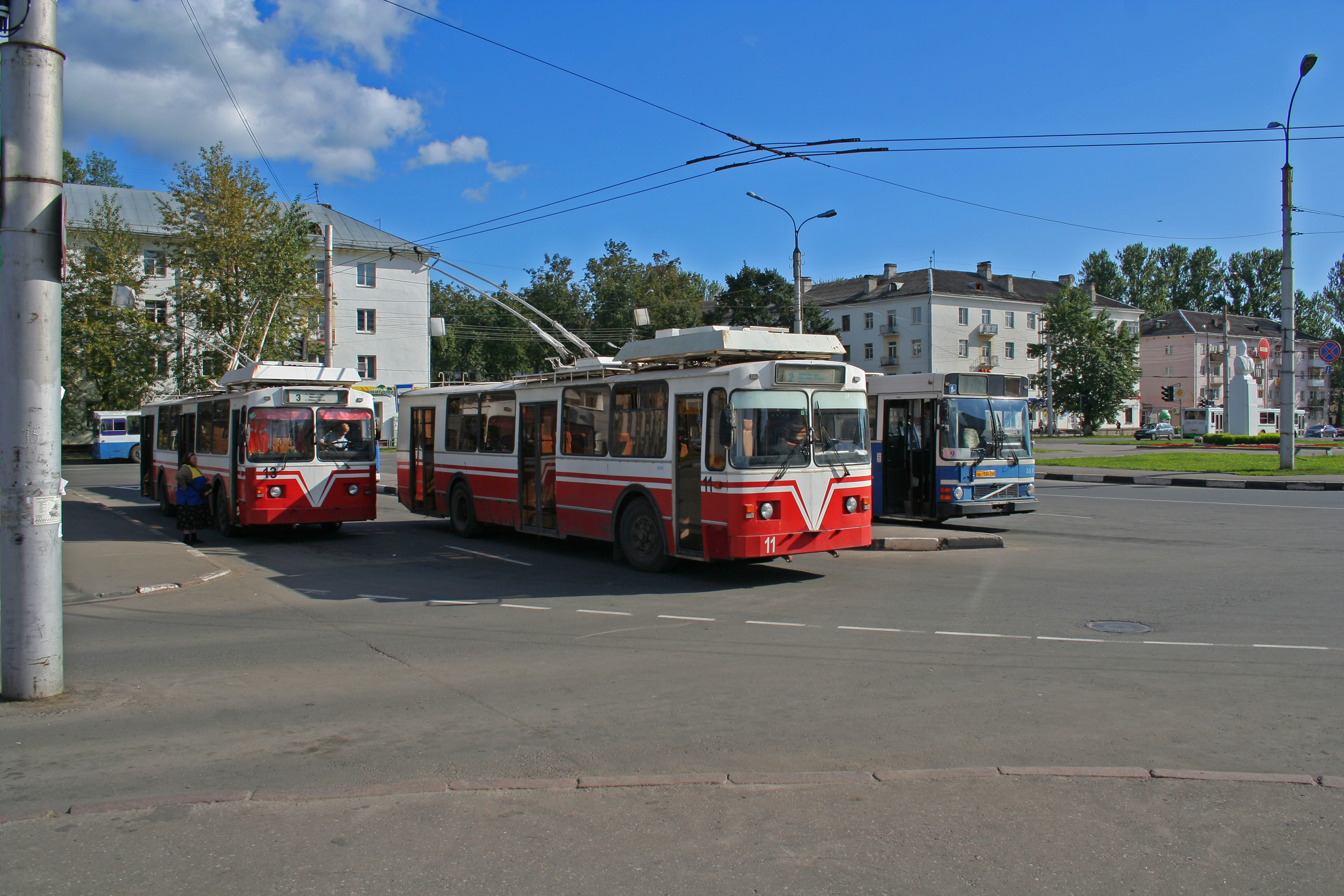
Trolleybuses ZiU-9

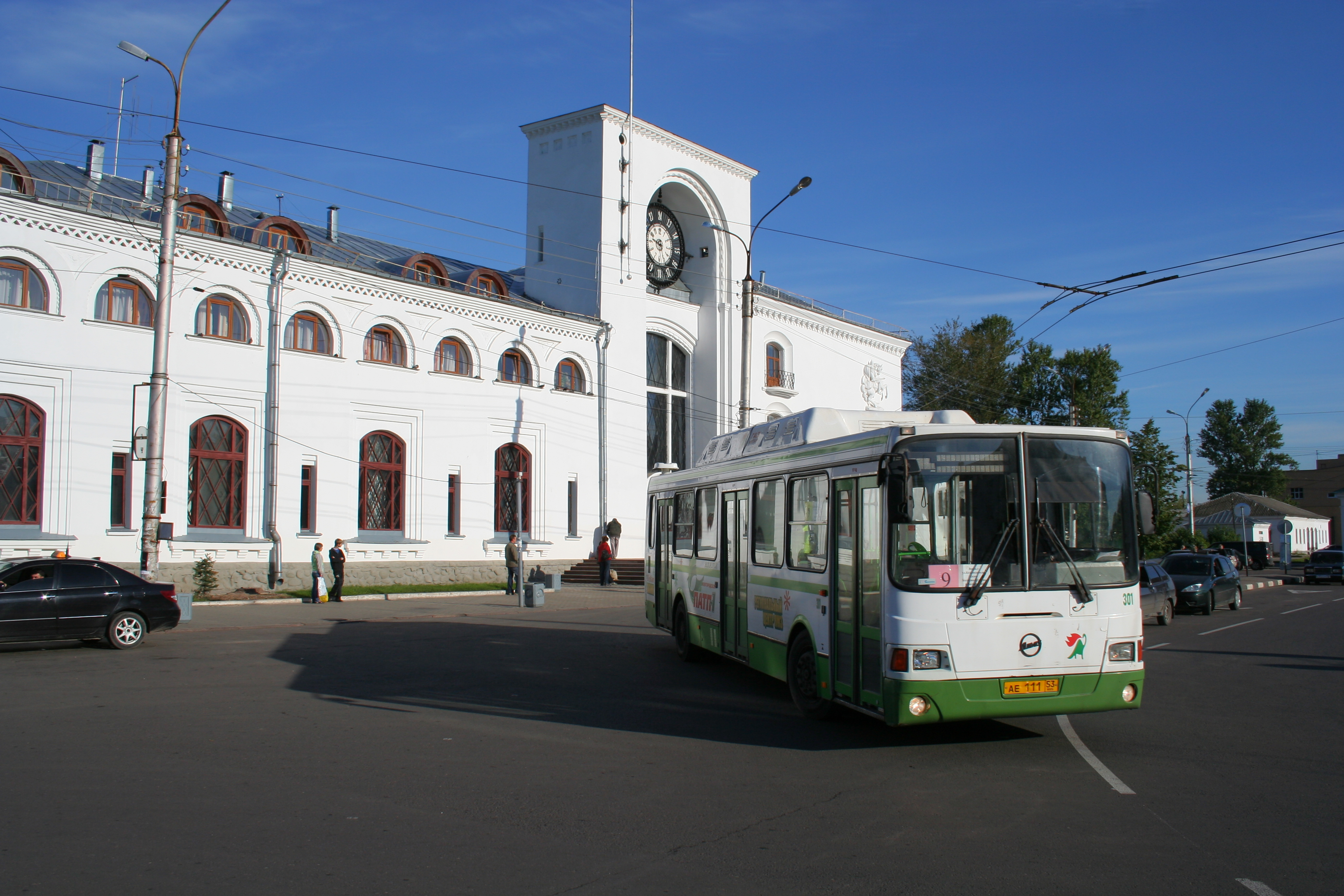
Bus LiAZ-5256

== Honours ==
A minor planet, 3799 Novgorod, discovered by the Soviet astronomer Nikolai Stepanovich Chernykh in 1979, is named after the city.

== Notable people ==
- Onfim (1220–60) was a Russian artist and student, renowned for his notes, drawings and homework exercises scratched onto soft birch bark.
- Anton Stepanovich Arensky (1861–1906) was an outstanding Russian composer, pianist and conductor. He became one of the prominent representatives of the Russian musical culture of the late 19th century. Arensky composed symphonic and chamber music, as well as music for the theater.
- Sergei Vasilyevich Rachmaninoff (1873–1943) was a great Russian composer, pianist and conductor, whose work occupies one of the central places in the history of music. His works, such as the Second and Third Piano Concertos, are considered masterpieces and are performed all over the world.
- Gavrila Romanovich Derzhavin (1743–1816) was an outstanding Russian poet, statesman, and representative of Russian classicism. His poetic works are known for their greatness and deep patriotic themes.
- Vsevolod Anisimovich Kochetov (1912–1973) was a Soviet writer, editor and journalist. He is known as the author of novels about life in the Soviet Union, including Zhurbiny and What do you Want?.
- Igor Alexandrovich Kaberov (1917–1995) — ace pilot of WWII, Hero of the Soviet Union. He has many successful aerial battles and victories to his credit.
- Nicholas Miklouho-Maclay (1846–1888) was a famous Russian traveler, ethnographer, anthropologist and humanist. He studied the life and way of life of the peoples of Southeast Asia, Oceania and Australia and made significant contributions to ethnography.
- Vitaly Valentinovich Bianki (1894–1959) was a Russian writer, the author of many works about nature, famous for short stories and fairy tales for children. His books help to develop children's love and interest in the world around them.

== Twin towns – sister cities ==
Veliky Novgorod is twinned with:

- Bielefeld, Germany
- Kohtla-Järve, Estonia
- Moss, Norway
- Nanterre, France
- Strasbourg, France
- (United States) Rochester, New York, USA
- Uusikaupunki, Finland
- (United Kingdom) Watford, UK
- Valga, Estonia
- Zibo, China

== See also ==
- FC Elektron Veliky Novgorod
- Novgorod uprising of 1650

== Sources ==
- "Новгород Великий" . Brockhaus and Efron Encyclopedic Dictionary (in Russian). 1906.
- Bushkovitch, Paul (June 24, 2010). "Novgorod". In Bjork, Robert E. (ed.). The Oxford Dictionary of the Middle Ages. Vol. 3. OUP Oxford. p. 1217. ISBN 978-0-19-866262-4.
- Lappo, G. M., ed. (1998). "Новгород". Города России. Энциклопедия (in Russian). Большая российская энциклопедия. pp. 304–310. ISBN 5-300-01747-7.
- Rybina, Ye. A.; Yanin, V. L.; Pavlinov, P. S. (2006). "Великий Новгород". In Kravets, S. L. (ed.). Большая Российская энциклопедия. Том 5: Великий князь — Восходящий узел орбиты (in Russian). Большая Российская энциклопедия. pp. 5–7. ISBN 5-85270-334-6.
- Vodoff, Vladimir (2000). "Novgorod". Encyclopedia of the Middle Ages. Vol. 2. James Clarke & Co. p. 1032. ISBN 978-0-227-67931-9.
- Дума Великого Новгорода. Решение №116 от 28 апреля 2005 г. «Устав муниципального образования – городского округа Великий Новгород», в ред. Решения №515 от 11 июня 2015 г. «О внесении изменений в Устав муниципального образования – городского округа Великий Новгород». Вступил в силу со дня официального опубликования, но не ранее 1 января 2006 года, за исключением статей, для которых подпунктом 5.1 установлены иные сроки вступления в силу. (Duma of Veliky Novgorod. Decision #116 of April 28, 2005 Charter of the Municipal Formation–Veliky Novgorod Urban Okrug, as amended by the Decision #515 of June 11, 2015 On Amending the Charter of the Municipal Formation–Veliky Novgorod Urban Okrug. Effective as of the day of official publication but not earlier than January 1, 2006, with the exception of the clauses for which subitem 5.1 establishes other dates of taking effect.).
- Администрация Новгородской области. Постановление №121 от 8 апреля 2008 г. «Об реестре административно-территориального устройства области», в ред. Постановления №408 от 4 августа 2014 г. «О внесении изменений в реестр административно-территориального устройства области». Опубликован: "Новгородские ведомости", №49–50, 16 апреля 2008 г. (Administration of Novgorod Oblast. Resolution #121 of April 8, 2008 On the Registry of the Administrative-Territorial Structure of Novgorod Oblast, as amended by the Resolution #408 of August 4, 2014 On Amending the Registry of the Administrative-Territorial Structure of Novgorod Oblast. ).
- Новгородская областная Дума. Областной закон №284-ОЗ от 7 июня 2004 г. «О наделении сельских районов и города Великий Новгород статусом муниципальных районов и городского округа Новгородской области и утверждении границ их территорий», в ред. Областного закона №802-ОЗ от 31 августа 2015 г. «О внесении изменений в некоторые областные Законы, устанавливающие границы муниципальных образований». Вступил в силу со дня, следующего за днём официального опубликования. Опубликован: "Новгородские ведомости", №86, 22 июня 2004 г. (Novgorod Oblast Duma. Oblast Law #284-OZ of June 7, 2004 On Granting the Status of Municipal Districts and Urban Okrug of Novgorod Oblast to the Rural Districts and the City of Veliky Novgorod and on Establishing the Borders of Their Territories, as amended by the Oblast Law #802-OZ of August 31, 2015 On Amending Various Oblast Laws Establishing the Borders of the Municipal Formations. Effective as of the day following the day of the official publication.).
- Государственная Дума Российской Федерации. Федеральный закон №111-ФЗ от 11 июня 1999 г. «О переименовании города Новгорода — административного центра Новгородской области в город Великий Новгород». Вступил в силу со дня официального опубликования. Опубликован: "Собрание законодательства РФ", No.24, ст. 2892, 14 июня 1999 г. (State Duma of the Russian Federation. Federal Law #111-FZ of June 11, 1999 On Renaming the City of Novgorod—the Administrative Center of Novgorod Oblast—the City of Veliky Novgorod. Effective as of the day of official publication.).
