= Peterhof =

Peterhof, Petergof, or Peterhoff may refer to:

- Peterhof Palace, a palace complex in St. Petersburg, Russia
- Petergof (Peterhof), a municipal town under jurisdiction of St. Petersburg, Russia, where the palace complex is located
- Peterhof (Novgorod), a historic Hanseatic kontor in Veliky Novgorod, Russia
- 13923 Peterhof, an asteroid
- USS Peterhoff (1863), a British ship captured by the Union Navy during the American Civil War
- Peterhoff, Shimla, a house in India, built for the Viceroy of India
