= Baltic maritime trade (c. 1400–1800) =

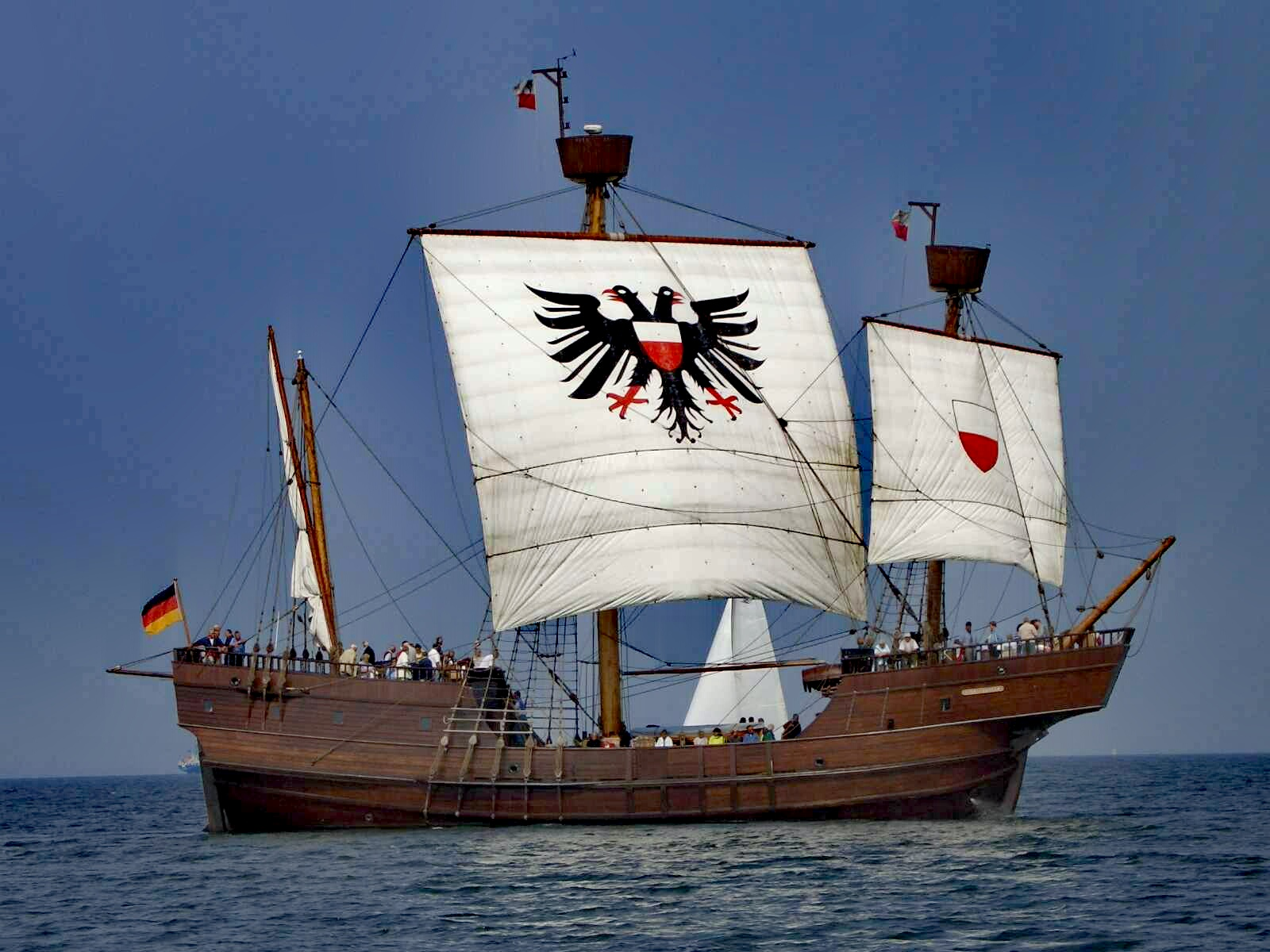
Reconstruction of a Hansekogge in Kraweel construction from the 15th century

Baltic maritime trade began in the Late Middle Ages and continued to develop into the early modern period. During this time, ships carrying goods from the Baltic and North Sea passed along the Øresund, or the Sound, connecting areas like the Gulf of Finland to the Skagerrak. Over a period of 400 years, maritime powers in the east and west struggled to control these markets and the trade routes between them. The Baltic trading system of this era can be explained as beginning with the Hanseatic League and ending with the Great Northern War.

== Era of the German Hanse ==
In the second half of the 14th century, the Hanseatic League dominated the trading organization in the Baltic. After the Treaty of Stralsund was signed in 1370, it reached the height of its influence. The Hanse originated in what is currently northern Germany and Westphalia and held many associations with merchants from these areas. In its prime, the Hanseatic League consisted of around 200 cities and towns and stretched from Reval in the east to Kampen in the west. The long-lasting success of the Hanseatic trading system can be attributed to Northern Europe’s many rivers and roads that connected German markets and cities to the ports in the Baltic Sea.

=== Lübeck ===
The city of Lübeck served as the starting point of the Hanseatic trading system. Merchant families from this area began to settle along the Wendish and Pomeranian coast. Merchants from Lübeck and the Wendish coastal towns specialized in the trading of high-quality western goods, like cloth, spices, and alcohol, for minerals and products from the north and east. These included:

- Prussian and Livonian hard husk grains
- Hemp and flax
- Unprocessed timber, deal boards, masts, and klapholz
- Russian tar for shipbuilding
- Scandinavian potash for glass making
- Swedish and Polish bar iron and copper
- Finnish and Russian wax, furs, leather, skins
- Baltic herring and beer
- Lüneburg salt

Lübeck maintained its position as the central trading port in the Hanseatic League through its location in the Kontors. The four main Kontors were Novgorod, London, Bergen, and Bruges. Between these ports, rich merchant families kept in close contact with foreign powers and promoted the interests of the League. The relationship between the Kontors and main Hanse merchant settlements allowed for the establishment of a monopoly of goods. These included wax and furs from Novgorod, cod from Bergen, and high-quality wool and cloth from London and Bruges.

=== Fall of the Hanseatic League ===
By the beginning of the fifteenth century, western demand for Prussian and Livonian goods was growing. The Lüneburg salt exports were replaced by cheaper salt from France. Gradually, eastern Baltic merchants wore away the Hanseatic trading system and began to directly supply ports in London, Amsterdam, and Antwerp. As the League began to fragment, Lübeck and the Wendish coastal towns became isolated, and trade routes between the Baltic shores, North Sea, and the western Atlantic were established. The success of Lübeck continued into the early 1600s, largely due to shipbuilding. Hanseatic towns, however, began to find themselves more and more restricted to the Baltic Sea, as trade routes opened up to the western Atlantic system. In the second half of the seventeenth century, Lübeck was replaced by Elbe harbor as the main maritime center of the League in the Baltic. This transfer of power would begin the fall of the Hanseatic League. In 1648, Sweden occupied the Pomeranian and northern German shores, which resulted in the last Hanseatic meeting in Lübeck in 1669 to confirm the League’s demise.

== New powers in the Baltic ==
=== Netherlands ===
At the beginning of the fifteenth century, large numbers of ships from Holland were sailing to the Baltic for grain and western France for salt. Instead of relying on the Hanseatic staple markets, the Dutch began to buy wheat and rye locally in order to drastically reduce prices. From the early to the late sixteenth century, it is estimated that the loading capacity of the merchant fleet increased by about 60,000 lasts. At the same time, Baltic grain imports increased by 50,000 lasts. Without the middlemen that existed during the Hanseatic era, transaction costs were at an all-time low, allowing for cuts in Dutch shipbuilding costs and innovations in design. These new ships were faster, smaller, and were equipped for bulk-carrying trade. Dutch traders also developed a new business model in the fifteenth century. For larger trades, merchants would sign short-term contracts. This was very useful in Baltic trade, as there was less individual risk for merchants.

=== Russia ===
Another power in the north was also rising at this time. The Russian grand prince, Ivan III, closed the Kontor in Novgorod in 1494. By 1558, Russian merchants had reached the Baltic coasts and occupied Livonia, Dorpat, and Narva. At this time, Russia and Sweden were competing for control of the routes that connected the Baltic coast and Russian lands. By the end of the sixteenth century, Russia had been secluded from Baltic trade after Sweden took control of Reval and Riga.

== The Dutch in the Baltic ==
In the 1590s, Dutch trade began to spread further into the Mediterranean and surpass that of Lübeck and Hamburg. This was largely due to Holland’s presence in the Atlantic trading system, which included Spain, Portugal, and France. This widespread trade led to Amsterdam becoming the center of Europe’s trading system in the seventeenth century. Exports to the Baltic such as sugar, tea, coffee, and tobacco greatly increased at this time.

=== Fluitschip ===
Around 1595, a ship known as the fluit was created in the Low Countries. This ship maximized carrying capacity and drastically cut building costs. It was built with a flat bottom and long hull that could transport a large shipment through shallow waters. This new ship could be crewed by a small number of men and cost about 50% of the usual price to build a ship.

== Changing mercantilist policies ==
As Dutch and English trade became more prominent in the West Baltic, many governments decided to impose certain mercantilist policies that would protect the interests of their trade and national economies.

=== Denmark ===
Christian IV was the Danish king from 1596 to 1648. During his reign he imposed policies that threatened the development of Dutch trade in the Baltics. When Denmark won the Kalmar War (1611–1613), the king imposed a ban on all Dutch traffic heading to Sweden and increased the Sound Toll duties. To combat this, the Dutch decided to form alliances with the Hanseatic League and Sweden in order to remain in access of the Sound. Christian IV was then forced to reduce these policies after the Dutch were guaranteed safe passage in the Baltic region. In 1632, the Spanish and Danish created a treaty that would reduce Dutch access to Baltic trade. At the same time, the Sound toll increased again, causing more problems for the Dutch because of the commodities they were trading. To counter these problems, the Dutch sent their navy into the Sound in 1645 as a threat to Copenhagen. Christian IV was forced to dissolve the new tolls at the Sound and in Glückstadt. An agreement was reached in 1649 that would return the Dutch trading power to the Baltic.

=== Sweden ===
The Thirty Years' War greatly hindered Denmark’s attempt at Baltic control. At this time, Sweden began to successfully campaign in Jutland and forced the Danish to give up many territories along the Sound and into the Baltic. The late seventeenth century would become known as Sweden’s Age of Greatness and would last until 1721. During this time, Sweden’s control of the Baltic reached from the Sound to Riga. During Sweden’s Baltic dominion, the Dutch navy intervened in order to protect their commercial interests. This led to a peace treaty in 1660 between Sweden and Denmark, along with negotiations between the English and Dutch. By the 1640s, Sweden had become the Dutch’s main trading partner in the Baltic region. Roughly half of Sweden’s imports passed through Amsterdam’s staple market. The Netherlands took all Swedish copper exports, about 40 per cent of iron exports, and around 75 per cent of Finnish tar output. In 1667, Sweden changed its mercantilist policies once again by imposing tolls on salt and wine that were shipped from foreign markets, greatly undermining trade coming from Amsterdam. The Dutch then sent their navy into the Baltic, and with the Danish, defeated the Swedes in a naval battle in 1679. The treaty that followed the Scanian War would result in the recovery of the Dutch’s trade in the Sound.

=== Danish-Norwegian ===
Denmark and Norway worked to maintain their mercantilist policies that would decrease their dependence on Amsterdam and the Dutch Republic as a whole. A treaty was signed in 1688 after the Danish attempted to impose tariffs on Dutch trading, but the Dutch held much less power in Denmark after this. The Dutch and the Norwegian began to trade directly with the English and French and avoided Amsterdam as a main trading port.

== Eastern Baltic ==
In the beginning of the seventeenth century, Dutch trade dominated the eastern Baltic region with goods like spices and high-quality cloth. This Dutch control, however, began to diminish in the later decades of this century. There are a few proposed explanations for this, one being that Baltic grain lost competitiveness in the western markets because Polish-Lithuanian farms declined in efficiency. Another explanation is the wars against the Cossacks and the Swedes that occurred in the 1640s-1660s. The English Navigation Acts also affected Dutch trade in the eastern Baltics. Sweden established new policies that significantly affected the eastern Baltic trading system. The Swedish Tar Company was created in 1648, which greatly undermined tar exports form Finland. This resulted in the illegal transportation of Finnish goods to Livonian ports, and Dutch traders that occupied southern Sweden transported timber from Norway to other ports around the Baltic.

=== Russian trade ===
The policies that Sweden established at this time also aimed to control Russian trade in the Baltic region. In an effort to remove the Dutch from the market, Sweden attempted to buy grain surpluses and entire stocks of leather from Russia. The Treaty of Cardis was established in 1661 to provide free trade in Russia, but ended soon after in 1667. The Dutch proved to be the only economically developed state that could successfully deal with the trading conditions of Russia.

== Great Northern War ==
From 1700 to 1721, Poland–Lithuania, Russia, and Denmark–Norway fought against Sweden, dramatically shifting the Baltic trading system at this time. At the beginning of the war, Dutch trade through the Sound was far outweighed by Scandinavian shipping. In 1710, when hostility between Denmark and Sweden began, trade through the Sound became inactive. In 1721, Sweden’s age of greatness came to an end and trade was restored from the Baltic Sea through the Sound. After the war ended, governmental interventionism became the forefront of all commercial policies in the powers of the Baltic. These protectionist measures were meant to decrease foreign influence on industries and trade within states. Some of examples of these policies are:

- Prussian ban on raw wool export
- Danish prohibition on import of foreign wool, silk, sugar, etc.
- Swedish Produktplakat (1724) – decreased foreign shipping to Sweden

== Rise of Russia ==
After Sweden's loss in the Great Northern War, Russia gained its ports from Novgorod to Riga, Reval, and Narva. These cities and ports provided Russia with direct routes to the Baltic. In 1721, the treaty of Nystad was signed, which led to the development of Russian Baltic trade and the founding of St. Petersburg. By 1780, Russia had surpassed the Pomeranian coast under Swedish control. The rise of Russia as a seaborne trading power cause a shift in trade direction from south-north to east-west. Stockholm was now a major port in the Baltic region, backed by Denmark’s demand of goods from Sweden’s market. The end of the eighteenth century was marked by the rise of Russia and Hamburg in the Baltic, and England’s gain on the Dutch.

== See also ==
- Company of Merchant Adventurers of London

== Bibliography ==
- Brand, Hanno. "Baltic Sea Trade." Baltic Connections. Hanse Research Center, 1 Jan. 2006. Web. 12 Apr. 2015. <https://web.archive.org/web/20071213194949/http://www.balticconnections.net/index.cfm?article=Baltic+Sea+Trade>.
- Dollinger, Phillipe. Casson, Mark. The German Hansa: The Emergence of International Business, 1200-1800. London, U.K; New York, NY, U.S.A.: Routledge, 2000.
- Harreld, Donald J. (27 January 2015). A Companion to the Hanseatic League. BRILL. ISBN 978-90-04-28476-0.
- Israel, I. Jonathan. The Dutch Republic: Its Rise, Greatness and Fall. 1477-1806. New York, NY, U.S.A.: Oxford University Press, 1995. ISBN 9780198207344
- Magnusson, Lars. An Economic History of Sweden. London, UK: Routledge, 2000.
