= Foreign trade of medieval Novgorod =

Aspect of Russian history

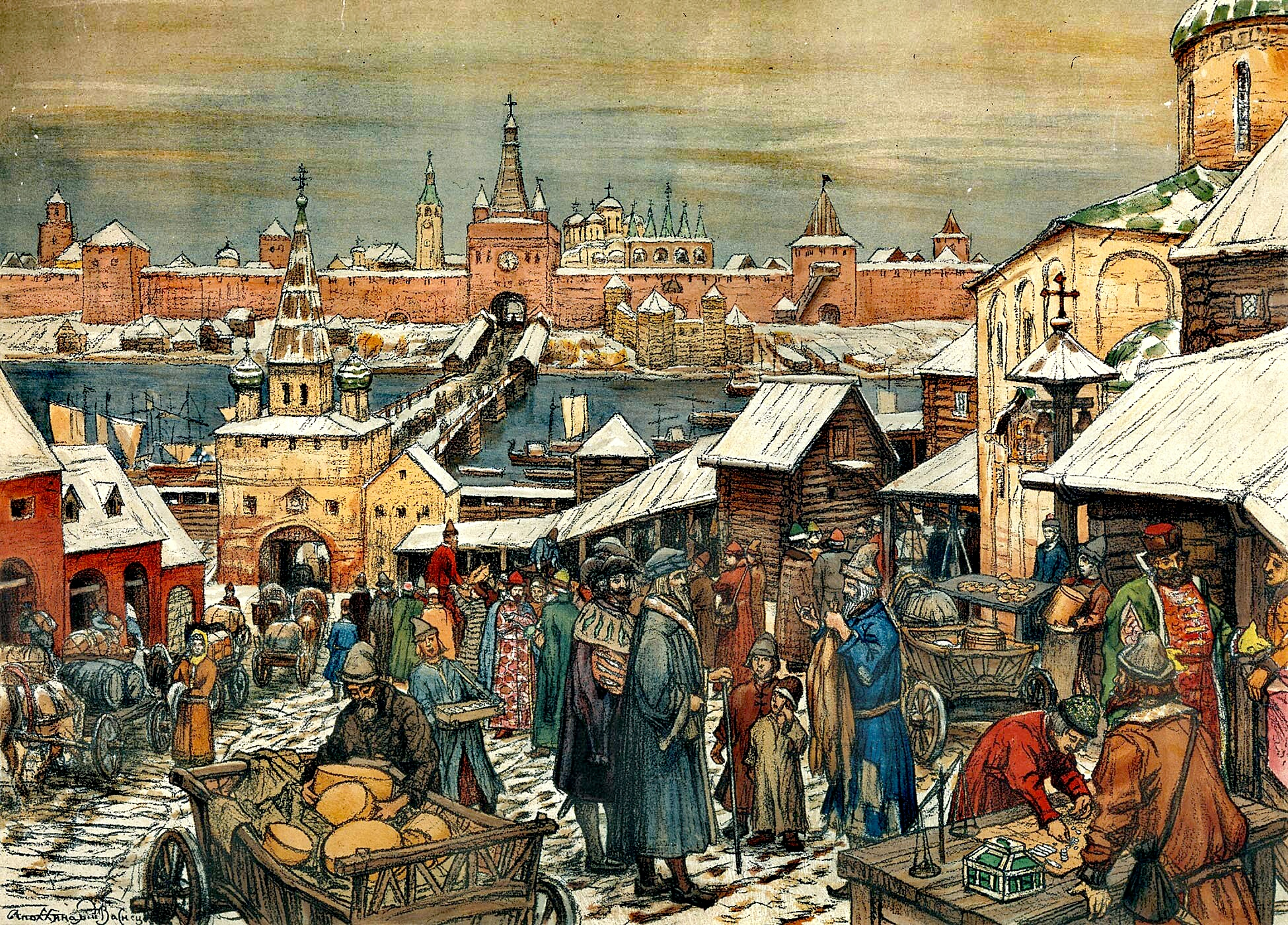
The marketplace in Novgorod, by Apollinary Vasnetsov.

The city of Novgorod was a major trade hub from the beginning of its history as part of Kievan Rus' through the years of the Novgorod Republic in the 12th–15th centuries. Novgorod benefitted from its location at the crossroads of several major trading routes, including the route from Scandinavia to the Byzantine Empire and the Volga route connecting Rus' to the Middle East. Novgorod had trade contact with inhabitants of the Baltic seaboard and was described as a "trade city" by Scandinavian merchants. Trade was eventually dominated by German cities united in the Hanseatic League, which had its easternmost office in Novgorod. Despite the thriving trade, Novgorod had numerous conflicts with the League. Moreover, its powerful commercial position also made it a prized target for Rus' princes of various competing branches, who sought to control Novgorod by attempted conquest, hindering its economy, or manipulating its politics.

The main exports of Novgorod were furs, honey, wax, leather and fish, while silver, cloth, wine, salt and herring were imported. Trade involved Novgorodians of different social status, including professional merchants, landowners, peasants and moneylenders. The center of trade in Novgorod was the Torg (Russian: торг, now archaic term for “marketplace”), located across the Volkhov from the Kremlin. The city's population grew from c. 10,000–15,000 in the early 11th century to c. 25,000 by the early 13th; a large city by that time's standards.

== Commodities ==
=== Exports ===
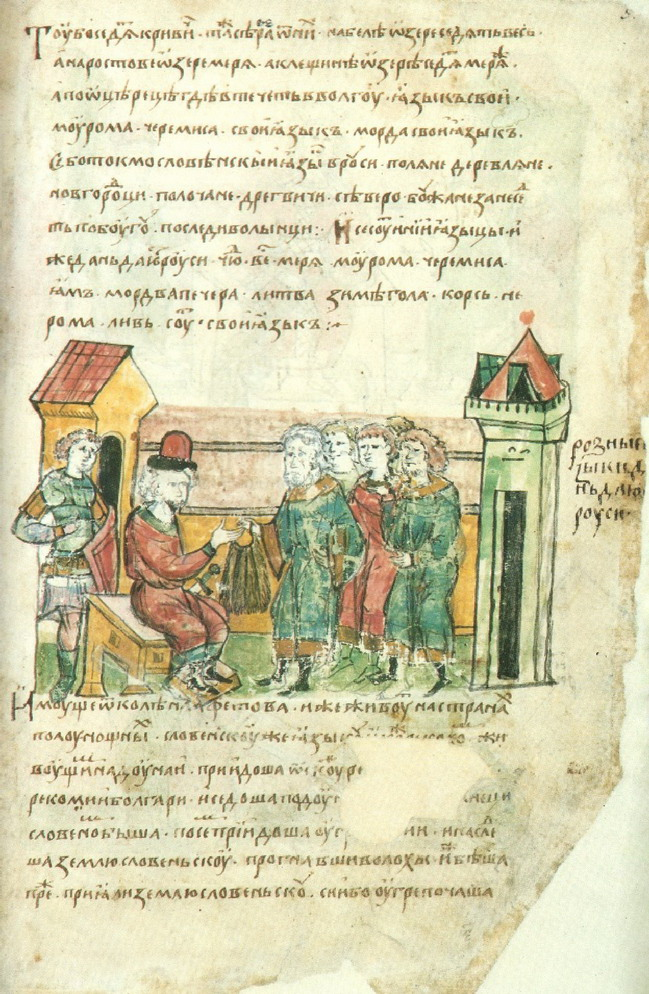
Tribute of fur (a miniature from the Radziwiłł Chronicle). Novgorod received fur from its dominions and exported it to the Western Europe.

Fur dominated the exports of Novgorod to Western Europe, where it was used for fashionable clothing for the elites. Squirrel formed the bulk of the exports, with the rest consisting of more valuable sable, mink and marten. Novgorod also exported honey, wax, leather and fish, plus amber jewellery and wooden goods.

=== Tribute collection ===
The furs came from the vast lands to the north and east of Novgorod, where animals hunted for their pelts were abundant. The Novgorodians even used furs as their primary currency, rather than metal coins, until the 14th century (see also coinless period). The Novgorod Republic acquired most of these raw materials and refined products in the form of tribute paid by subjected Finno-Ugric peoples living there. In the northwest, most of Karelia got under Novgorodian control early on, and was a major source for wood and furs.

The northeastern territories (Zavolochye, "beyond the portage", and across the Northern Dvina) were gradually acquired in small-scale Novgorodian expeditions from the first half of the 12th century onwards. The local fragmented and scattered tribes in these sparsely populated regions were subjected without much need for force; the Novgorodians simply built pogosts: palisaded taxing centres with small garrisons on defendable riverbanks. This turned the surrounding areas into dependencies (rather than being directly incorporated into the Republic) that could be taxed for various (exportable) commodities. It would take until the early 13th century for real settlements to emerge around the pogosts, and gradual agricultural colonisation of the northeastern regions to begin. Before the agricultural colonisation accelerated on a larger scale in the 14th century, hunting, fishing and bee-keeping were also important economic activities in the northeastern dependencies.

By contrast, Novgorodian attempts at westward expansion into the Livonia, at the expense of the more numerous Chud' and Litva populations, as well as German-speaking Catholic chivalric orders, were far less successful. These ventures did not result in a steady revenue of tradeable goods, but rather increased competition.

=== Imports ===
Silver, steel, salt and herring, cloth, wine, and spices were imported from Western Europe. Novgorod also imported silver and other metals such as copper, tin and lead. Since they were needed for armaments, Sweden and the Livonian order tried to stop this trade during their conflicts with Novgorod. When harvests were poor, the Novgorodians had to import grain, usually from the Rus' principality of Vladimir-Suzdal to its southeast.

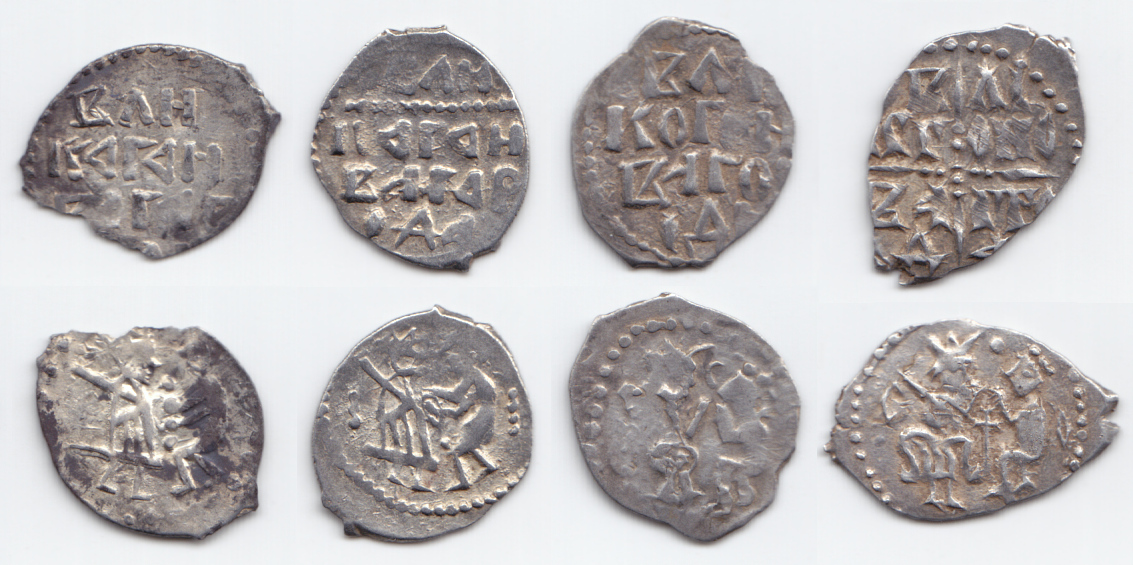
Four Novgorod dengas, 1420–1478

The stream of Oriental silver dirham coins which Novgorodians imported from the Persians through Bolghar in the 10th century, and partially re-exported to Scandinavia, came to an end in the early 11th century. The city-state managed to obtain a new source of silver via German merchants in the 11th century in the form of deniers. By the 12th century, these silver coins were replaced by silver ingots. By the 14th century, foreign coins were becoming a major form of currency due to the Baltic commerce, replacing fur as the primary means of exchange. Finally, from 1420 to 1478, the Novgorod Republic was able to mint and distribute its own coin, the novgorodka.

== Trade with Western Europe ==
=== Scandinavia and the Baltic ===
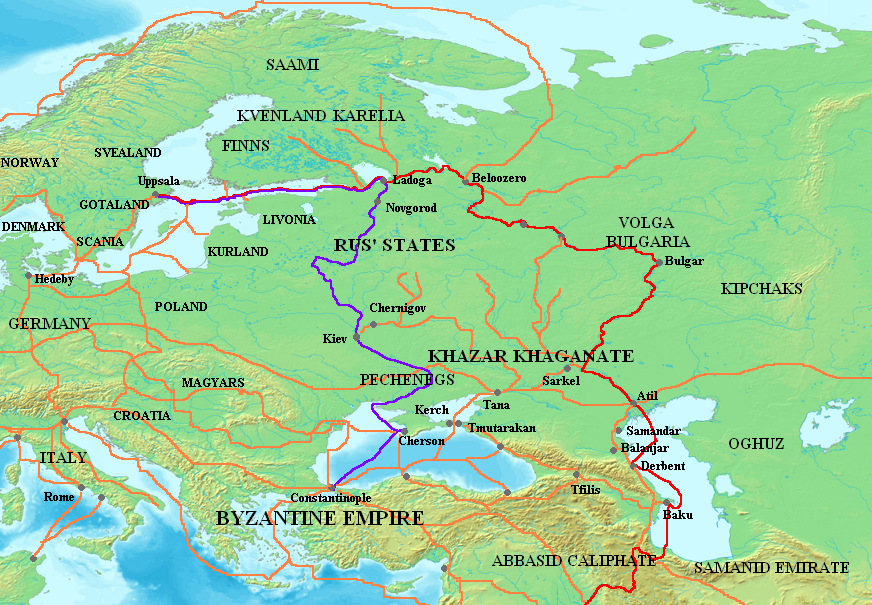
Novgorod benefitted from the major trade routes which met there: to the south by the Dnieper, to the east by the Volga and to the west across the Baltic Sea

Novgorodian trade contact with inhabitants of the Baltic seaboard took place from the earliest times and grew in importance over time. The Scandinavian sagas describe Novgorod (Holmgardr) as a "trade city" which was visited by Scandinavian merchants who bought furs and luxury cloth. The similarity of objects found in hoards in Novgorod and Southern Baltic attests to contact between the regions.

Contact with Gotland was established in the 10th century and became stronger by the 12th century when merchants from Gotland founded a trading house known as the Gothic Yard in Novgorod with the church of St Olaf. At that time Novgorodians sailed the Baltic themselves (several incidents involving Novgorodian merchants in Gotland and Denmark are reported in the Novgorodian First Chronicle) and had a trade post on Gotland of which only the ruins of an Orthodox church remain.

=== German merchants and the Hanseatic League ===
Gradually trade in the Baltic became dominated by the German cities which eventually were united into the Hanseatic League. The League monopolised the Baltic trade and had its easternmost trading post in Novgorod. Over time a pattern emerged, with two groups of merchants departing for Novgorod from Livonian cities twice a year, in summer and winter. They travelled both by sea and by land. The sea route went from Reval to Kotlin Island, where goods were reloaded to Russian river boats, then by the Neva, Lake Ladoga and the Volkhov. The importance of the land route grew during conflicts between Novgorod and Sweden in the late 13th and early 14th centuries.

In spite of the thriving trade, Novgorod had numerous conflicts with the League which were usually caused by disagreement on terms of exchange, violations of the rules of trade and attacks on merchants. A trade war from 1385–1391 was concluded by Niebur's peace treaty which set the terms of trade. The treaty gave merchants the right of free passage and established the principle of individual responsibility for infractions, in contrast to the previous practice of collective responsibility.

The treaty became the basis for the relationship between Novgorod and German cities for the next hundred years but did not prevent numerous conflicts in the 15th century. The main points of contention were the right of Novgorodian merchants to carry out sea trade independently and the terms of exchange. German merchants had the right to inspect furs and wax (by chipping off pieces which were not included in the final weight) whereas Russian merchants had to buy batches of cloth, barrels of herring and wine and sacks of salt without examining or weighing them. At the same time, trade with non-Hanseatic cities such as Narva, Vyborg and Stockholm grew in importance.

== Trade with the East ==
=== Route from the Varangians to the Greeks ===
Trade routes of Kievan Rus' in the late 10th century.

The route from the Varangians to the Greeks went south via Kiev, where Novgorodian merchants had a court in Podil. By the year 1000, silk, glassware, silver coins, jewellery, wine, and oil were imported from Byzantium and the Abbasid Caliphate via this route. Novgorod was the primary Rus' marketplace where these commodities from the east were exchanged for European goods, such as woollen cloth, pottery, and weapons. Much of the Rus' fur that was exported to Constantinople through Kiev came from the Novgorodian northern dependencies; in return, Byzantine spices such as nuts were sent back to Novgorod. This trade route along the Dnieper began to decline after about 1100, when the Cumans (Polovtsi) conquered the northern shores of the Black Sea. It took another massive hit after the 1204 Sack of Constantinople tore the Byzantine Empire apart, and came to a virtual end after the sack of Kiev by the Mongols in 1240.

=== Volga trade route ===
The Volga route was important in the 9th and 10th centuries when large quantities of silver were imported via Bolghar (trade hub of the mid-Volga), Rostov and Novgorod (trade hub of the Upper Volga) into Northern Europe. The trade continued even after the Mongol invasion; however, this direction was no longer of primary importance for Novgorod.

Grain from Vladimir-Suzdal and other Rus' territories was vital to Novgorod, as it was not reliably self-sufficient. Grain was transported via the river Volga and its tributaries, with the town of Torzhok controlling the trade. The Novgorodians built Torzhok (Russian: Торжок; originally called Novy Torg, Russian Новый торг, "new market") in the early 12th century in order to protect the Volga trade route against Suzdalian raids. The Novgorodians and Suzdalians twice waged war (in 1147–1149 and 1169–1170) over the control of the borderlands between them, and the ability to collect tribute from the various peoples in the northern regions; Novgorod was victorious on both occasions. But the Suzdalians increasingly intercepted and interrupted trade between Novgorod and Bolghar along the Volga, and that diminished Novgorodian profits, as well as opportunities for imports from the East and exports to the East. Novgorodian fur exports to the Volga Bulgars declined in the late 12th and early 13th century due to this Suzdalian interference.

=== Refinement and internal competition ===
In some cases, raw materials such as glass were refined in Kiev to products such as glass bracelets (see also Kievan Rus' ornament), before being distributed within Kievan Rus' to domestic cities such as Chernigov, Novgorod, and the towns of Rostov-Suzdal'. By the 12th century, workshops for enamelled glassware and other products were also being established in these cities, sparking commercial competition with the Kievan artisans from whom they had learnt the trade.

== Merchants, taxes and regulation ==
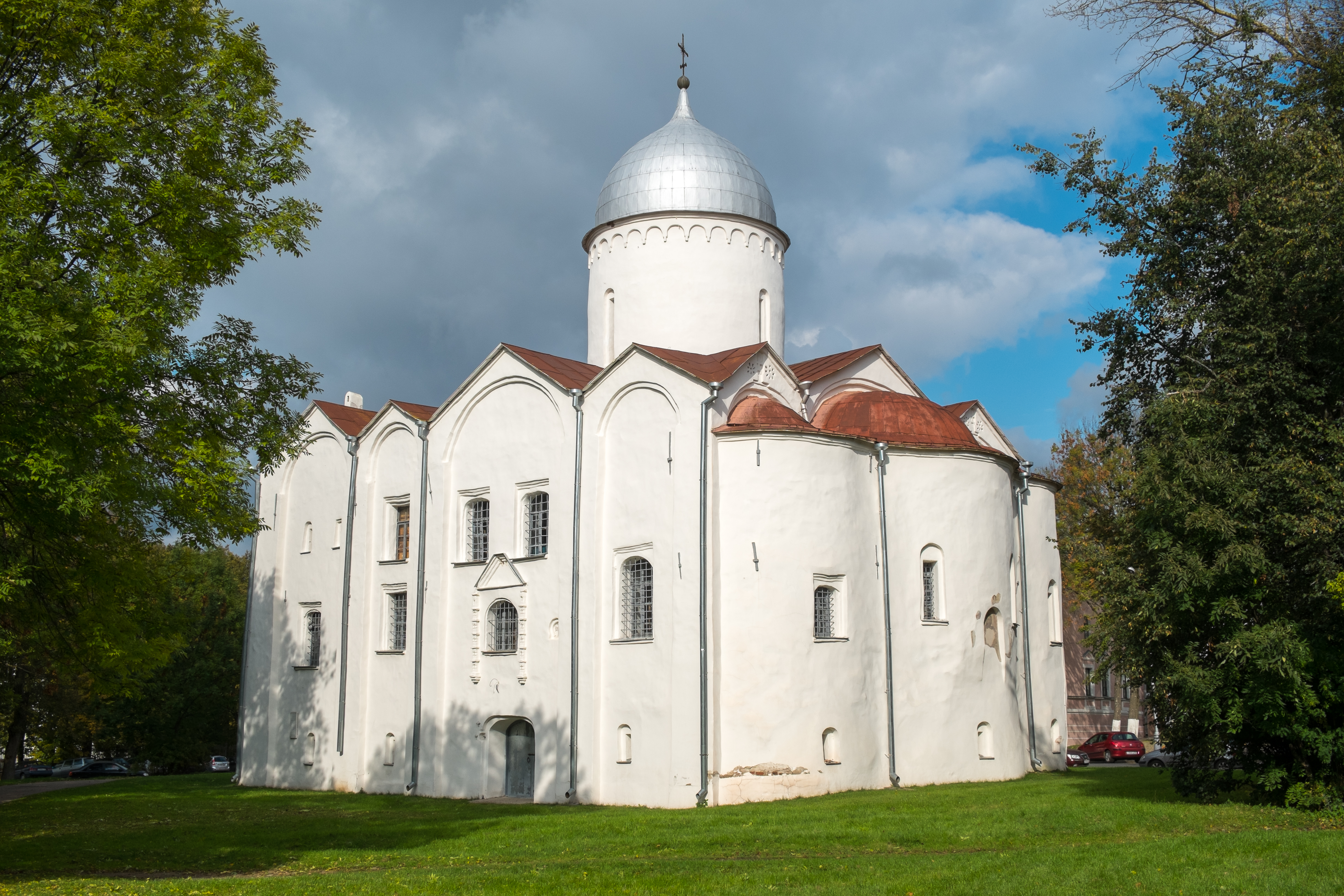
The church of St John the Forerunner on the Torg was one of the merchants' churches and held weight and length standards.

Analysis of birch bark documents has shown that the trade involved Novgorodians from almost all social strata: professional merchants, landowners, peasants and moneylenders.

The merchants carrying out the trade with Western Europe and other Russian cities were called gosti. Some of them formed associations, of which the most famous were the associations of wax merchants known as Ivan's Hundred and the associations of the overseas merchants.

Novgorod Torg, on the other side of the Volkhov from the Kremlin, was the centre of trade in the city. The quays, trade rows, merchants' churches and foreign merchants' courts were all located there. Objects belonging to German merchants, including a birch-bark document with an inscription in Latin, have been found during excavations of the Gothic Yard. Disputes between merchants were under the jurisdiction of the merchant court which included the tysyatsky and two representatives of the merchants. It sat near the church of St John the Forerunner in the Torg, where the weight and length standards were kept as well.

Trade dues were initially collected by the princes but in the 13th century the merchants' corporations got this right. The rules of trade were codified in agreements between Novgorod its princes Vsevolod and Yaroslav. The agreements set the level of dues Novgorodian merchants paid in lands belonging to the prince and prohibited establishing customs houses and interfering in international trade. These terms served as a precedent and were renewed in all subsequent agreements between Novgorod and its princes until the end of the republic.

== See also ==
- Economy of Kievan Rus'
- Economy of the Pskov Republic
- Money of Kievan Rus'

== Bibliography ==
- Казакова, Н. А. (1975). Русско-ливонские и русско-ганзейские отношения (in Russian). Ленинград: Наука.
- Кушнир, Илья Иосифович (1982). Архитектура Новгорода (in Russian). Лениздат.
- Рыбина, Е. А. (1978). Археологические очерки истории новгородской торговли (in Russian). Издательство Московского Университета.
- Рыбина, Е. А. (2007). Янин, В. Л. (ed.). Великий Новгород. Энциклопедический словарь (in Russian). Нестор-История. p. 456. ISBN 9785981872365.
- Хорошев, А. С. (2007). Янин, В. Л. (ed.). Великий Новгород. Энциклопедический словарь (in Russian). Нестор-История. p. 456. ISBN 9785981872365.
- Хорошкевич, А. Л. (1963). Торговля Великого Новгорода с Прибалтикой и Западной Европой (in Russian). Издательство АН СССР.
- Lukin, Pavel V. (2017). Wubs-Mrozewicz, Justyna; Krom, Mikhail; Blockmans, Wim (eds.). The Routledge Handbook of Maritime Trade around Europe 1300-1600. Routledge. ISBN 9781315278551.
- Martin, Janet (2004). Treasure of the Land of Darkness: The Fur Trade and Its Significance for Medieval Russia. Cambridge University Press. ISBN 9780521548113.
- Martin, Janet (2007). Medieval Russia: 980–1584. Second Edition. E-book. Cambridge: Cambridge University Press. ISBN 978-0-511-36800-4.
- Paul, Michael C. (March 2007). "Secular Power and the Archbishops of Novgorod before the Muscovite Conquest". Kritika: Explorations in Russian and Eurasian History. 8 (2): 231–270. doi:10.1353/kri.2007.0020. S2CID 153403531.
- Péderi, Tamás (2017). "The Role of Economy in the Early Wars of Novgorod". Specimina Nova Pars Prima Sectio Medaevalis. 9. University Library of Pécs: 123–134. doi:10.15170/spmnnv.2017.09.06. ISSN 1588-8002.
