= Economy of Kievan Rus' =

Medieval economy

The economy of Kyivan Rus' was one of the most powerful economies in medieval Europe, second only to the Byzantine economy. The basic components of the Kievan Rus' economy were formed by agriculture, craft production, and domestic and intercontinental trade.

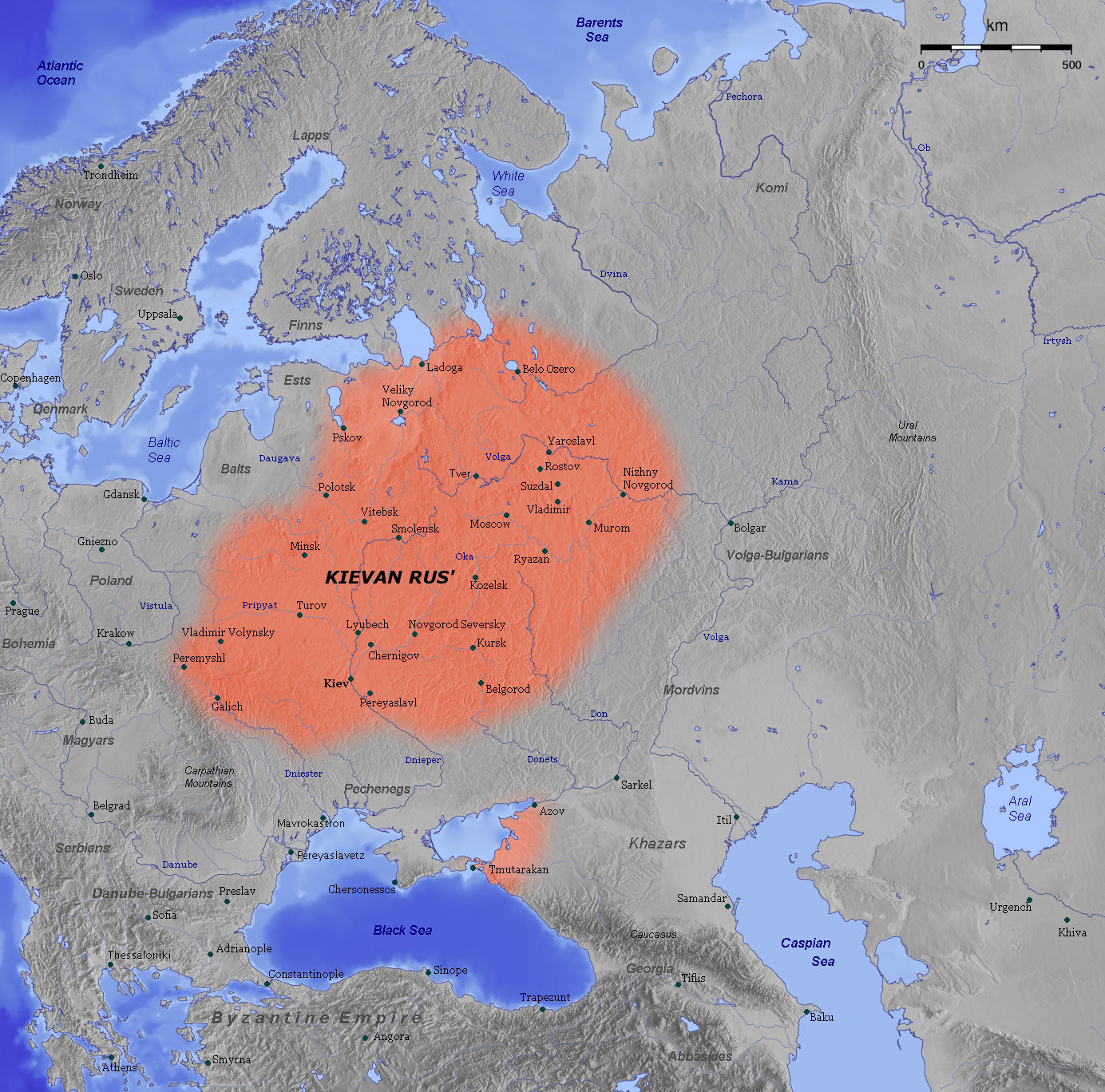
Map of Kievan Rus'

The heyday of Kievan Rus' in the 9th–11th centuries was mainly due to its favourable geographical position at the crossroads of trade routes and its connections with the countries of Western Europe, the North and the South. In the 12th century, after nomads blocked the trade route along the Dnieper River, the "route from the Varangians to the Greeks", Kievan Rus' disintegrated into independent Rus' principalities. Exhausted by internal strife and attacks by the Polovtsians, Mongols, Tatars, Poles, and Lithuanians, they became the outlying lands of other, more powerful states.

== Overview of socio-economic development ==
From the 9th to 12th centuries, the economy of the Kievan Rus' state can be characterised as a period of early feudalism. The emergence and development of feudalism is manifested primarily in the formation and growth of feudal land ownership. Feudal land ownership was the economic basis of the feudal class's domination, as evidenced by early 9th-century written sources and archaeological finds. According to the historian Alex M. Feldman, because the early laws governing legal access to land ownership were commensurate with early laws governing legal access to bullion, early feudalism in Kievan Rus' was coefficient with early versions of the Political economy of Mercantilism.

In the 9th century, a ruling class of feudal lords emerged, including the princes of Kiev, local princes, and boyars. In the 9th century, the state and personal princely authority were not yet sufficiently differentiated. The formation of the grand prince's domain and the domains of individual princes intensified in the 10th century. The princely domain was an estate that belonged not to the state, but to the prince himself as a feudal lord. Alongside the grand princely domain and the estates of local princes, boyar and druzhina landholdings also appeared. The question of when boyar landholdings first appeared in Kievan Rus' has not yet been resolved by historians due to the incompleteness of the sources. With the introduction of Christianity in Kievan Rus', the church (the Metropolis of Kiev and all Rus') became a major feudal lord. The practice of donating land to monasteries and churches gradually spread, turning them into large landowners.

The main feature of the early stage of Eastern European feudalism was the dominance of the tribute form of exploitation, the so-called "poliudia" (court session). During the poliudia, the prince or officials held court and carried out punishments based on the complaints the population had brought to them. In addition to poliudia, there was also a "povoz" ("transportation fee" or "cart tax"): the population of those lands where the prince and his governors could not or did not want to go had to bring tribute to Kiev themselves. This tribute usually took the form of agricultural products in carts, delivered to the prince's court, market, or field camp during a military campaign.

This form of tribute collection dates back to the 6th- 8th centuries. It was also preserved in the state of Kievan Rus'. The amount of tribute, the place, and the time of collection were not determined in advance but depended on the occasion. Later, in response to protests from the population, Princess Olga established "lessons" in 946, i.e., fixed rates of tribute, the time and place of collection. The unit of tribute was the "dym" (yard, family) or "plough" ("ralo"). As princes and nobles seized communal lands, feudal estates were formed, giving rise to forms of exploitation such as labour.

The vast majority of people employed in labour were feudal dependents: the smerdy, singular smerd (Old East Slavic: смердъ, romanized: smerdǔ), translatable as "peasant farmers". They had their own households, but for a certain period, they had to work for the feudal lord in exchange for land. The fragmentary and unclear nature of the sources on smerdy led to the emergence of different points of view on this category of the population of Kievan Rus' in the pre-Soviet period. The term smerdy may be variously translated as "peasants" or "serfs", depending on how their status is interpreted.

In Kievan Rus', the term zakup (закуп) was used to describe the feudal dependent peasantry. A zakup was a person who had fallen into debt bondage and was obliged to repay the kupa (купа; "heap" or "pile") received from the master by his labour in the household. A zakup was supposed to do agricultural work. He had to look after the owner's cattle. The feudal lord gave the zakup a plot of land, as well as agricultural tools and working cattle, to pay off the debt. Close in position to the zakups were the rjadovychi (рядовичі): peasants who worked for the feudal lord under a contract (ряд rjad). Rjadovychi literally means "sons of the contract". All rjadovychi and zakups were economically dependent on the landowner, and legally dependent on him as well. If a debtor evaded payment of the debt, he could become enslaved.

In the rural community, there was a group called izgoi ("outcasts"). An izgoi is a person who has been "outlived", knocked out of the ordinary, deprived of their previous state. There were two types of izgoi: free and dependent. A significant contingent of feudal dependents, izgoi, was composed of serfs who had been redeemed into freedom.

In Kievan Rus', the non-free population included slaves. One of the sources of slavery was captivity. In the 11th–12th centuries, the term "chelyad" (челядь) was used to refer to captive slaves. According to Ruska Pravda, a chelyadyn is a slave under the rule of his master, a beaten and completely disenfranchised creature. Unlike the serfs (челяді), slaves (раби)-kholops (холопи)-are members of a tribe, a product of the social processes that took place in the society of Kievan Rus'. The Ruska Pravda also mentions such sources of serfdom as self-sale, marriage to a slave "without a contract", and becoming a tiun or a keyman "without a contract. A procurer who ran away or committed a crime automatically became a serf.

Patriarchal slavery also existed on the territory of Kievan Rus', but it did not become the dominant form of economic activity. Slaves, mostly from prisoners of war, eventually received land plots and were "adopted" by the community, as the use of slave labour was inefficient. Many pious people let some of their slaves go free or bequeathed them to the church before they died.

The gradual assault on the community, the enslavement of the smerdy, and the seizure (enclosure) of common land, all led to growing resistance to landowners. The smerdy would flee from the feudal lords to the "wastelands", i.e. to free lands, raised spontaneous riots, kill representatives of the fiefdom administration, and organise massive thefts of the feudal lords' property. This forced the Kievan princes to pay attention to the development of legal norms of internal state life. Thus, in 1016, under Yaroslav the Wise, the Ruska Pravda was compiled, becoming an important collection of Kievan Rus' law.

== Agriculture, husbandry, hunting and fishing ==
Agriculture was the leading sector of the economy of Kievan Rus', and it reached a high level of development. Ancient traditions, natural conditions and large amounts of land owned by peasants contributed to the development of agriculture and animal husbandry. Kievan society was dependent on food production by the rural peasantry.

=== Agriculture ===
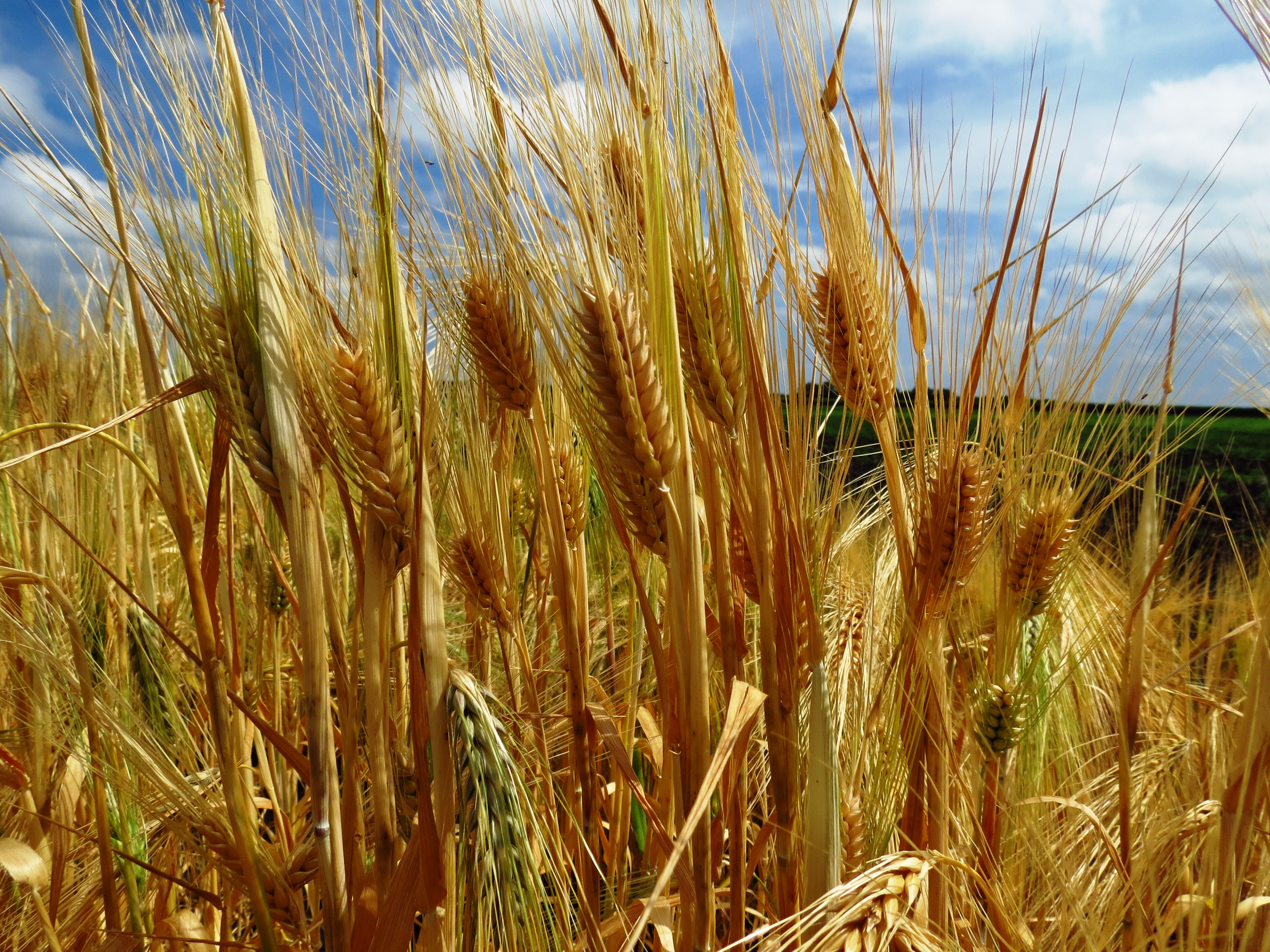
Spring barley in the field (pictured in 2015, modern Ukraine). Archaeological evidence suggests northern communities were planting both winter and spring crops as early as the 11th and 12th centuries, sowing winter rye late in the year, which sprouted once the snows melted in spring. The southerners had longer growing seasons, and fertile black soils, and typically cultivated millet instead of rye.

The main cereal grain crops in Kievan Rus' were rye in the north, millet in the south, supplemented by barley, wheat, buckwheat, and oats. Peas, lentils, flax, and hemp were also grown.

The lands of Kievan Rus' were primarily located in two climatic zones: the Eurasian Steppe (including parts of the East European forest steppe and Ponto-Caspian steppe) with the highly fertile black soils south and west of Kiev (encompassing most of present-day Ukraine), and the forest zone in the northwest (including the Novgorod Republic and present-day Belarus) and the northeast (including the region known as Zalesye, or "area beyond the forest", which became the core of Vladimir-Suzdal). Unlike the forest-steppes in the southwest, the northern forestlands (covered with cedar and birch trees, and more to the south oak trees) were generally well-watered, with adequate precipitation and extensive river systems to sustain agriculture. However, the lands north of the 50th parallel (above Kiev) had short growing seasons and lacked the highly fertile black soils of the southwest.

The northern climate always made agriculture precarious, never allowed for abundant production, and sometimes caused the farming system to break down. Several famines have been recorded in written sources, such as the 1024 famine in Suzdalia caused by a drought, prompting the inhabitants to buy grain from Volga Bulgaria. Another famine took place in the Rostov region and Yaroslavl in 1071. Throughout the year 1092, there was a drought in southern Kievan Rus', after which a late frost destroyed young crops and ruined the harvest, causing another famine.

In the forest-steppe zone, the steam farming system with two- and three-field crop rotations was used; in the forest zone, the slash-and-burn agriculture system and shifting cultivation (long fallowing) system. Woods were cut down and burnt, thus freeing up arable land and fertilising the soil at the same time. In forest-steppe and steppe regions, the most common farming system was fallowing (crop rotation), in which the fertility of the land was restored naturally.

High labour productivity made it possible to produce more grain than was necessary to meet the biological needs of the population. This, as well as the availability of excellent pastures and hayfields, allowed feudal households to keep large numbers of livestock. For tilling the soil and growing crops, the most advanced tools of the time were used: scythes (for mowing hay), sickles (for reaping), hoes, spades, ards, ploughs, sokhas, harrows, mattocks, and others for digging or ploughing, which were sophisticated enough to ensure high yields – on average, slightly less than 8 centners of grain per hectare. A flail was used to thresh the grain. Sometimes peasants formed collectives to share equipment and help each other with farm work.

=== Livestock breeding ===
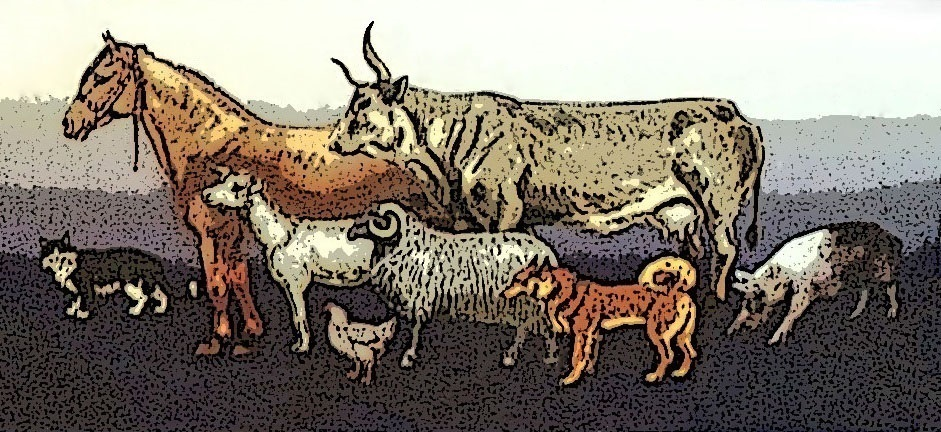
Domestic animals commonly bred and kept in Kievan Rus'. Kursk State Regional Museum of Archaeology, 2010.

The availability of pastures and hayfields supported the breeding of livestock, which provided the population with meat, dairy products, and raw materials for clothing and footwear. Princes and wealthy boyars owned flocks of sheep, and herds of cattle, goats, and horses. They grazed their livestock from spring to autumn in meadows, floodplains, forests, fallow land, and steppes. Hay and grain were stored as winter feed.

=== Hunting and fishing ===
Hunting forest and steppe animals provided meat and furs. Marten, fox, beaver, and squirrel pelts ere among the principal exports of Kievan Rus'. The production of beeswax and honey was economically important These goods were sold in the markets of the Byzantine Empire, the Middle East, and Western Europe, where merchants could obtain jewellery, fabrics, wine, fruit, and weapons in exchange for their produce.

== Urban development ==
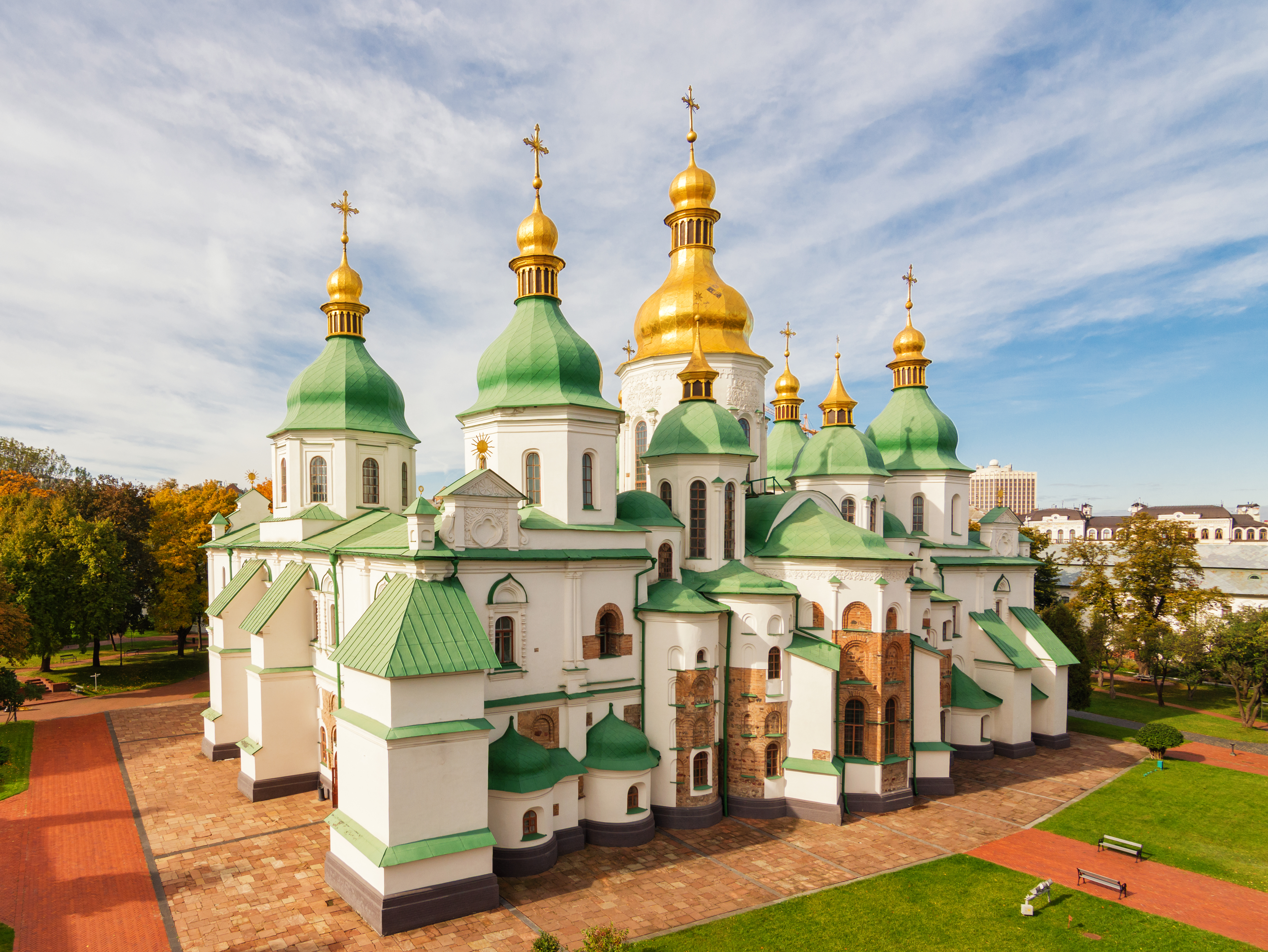
Saint Sophia Cathedral, Kyiv (pictured in 2017), first constructed in the 11th century

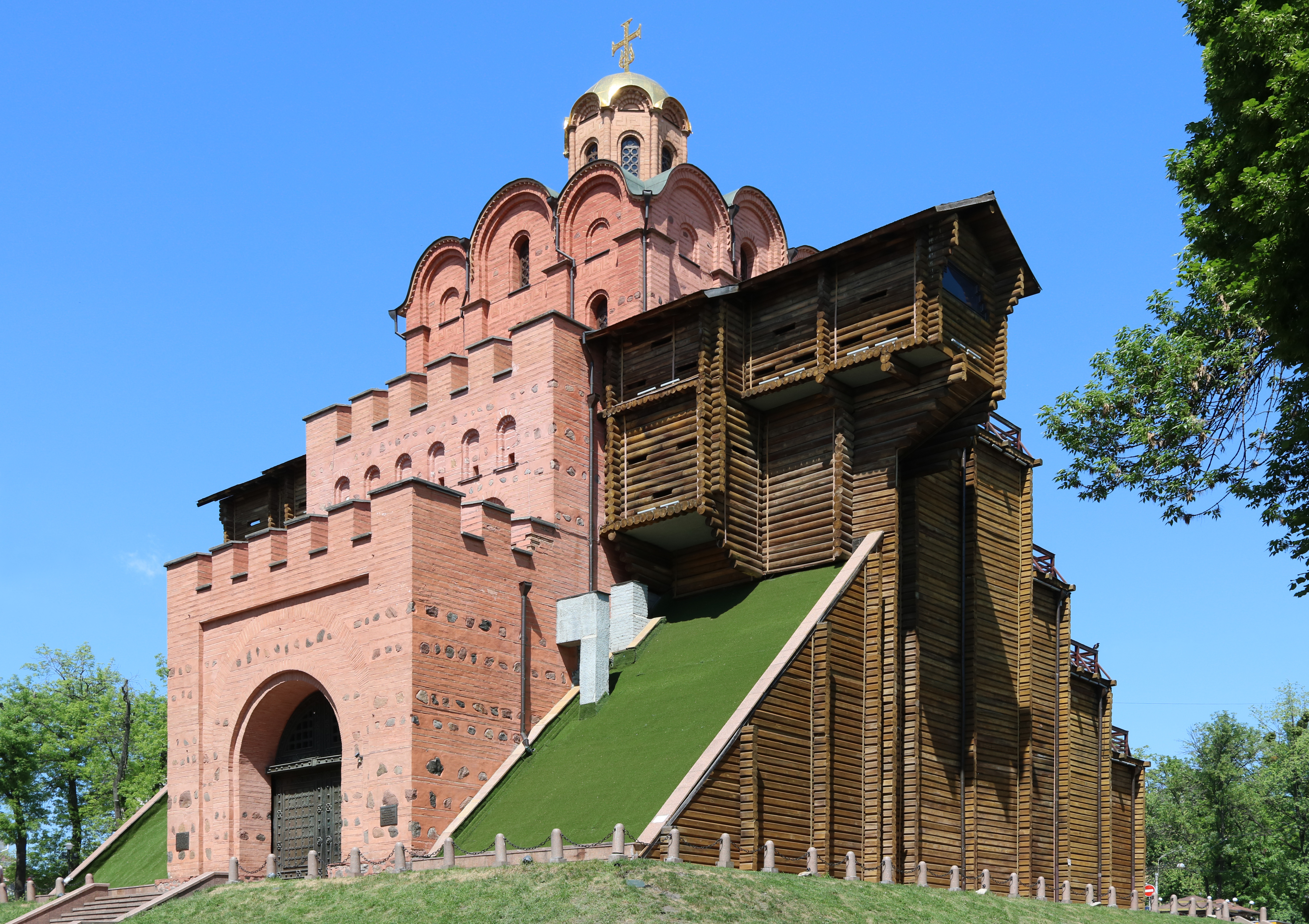
1982 reconstruction of the Golden Gate, Kyiv, pictured in 2018 after major renovations

East Slavic, Finno-Ugric, Turkic, and Baltic cities were created from small craft and trade settlements even before the formation of the state. The remains of these towns, the hillforts, remain in large numbers in the northern lands of present-day Ukraine: 400 in Kyiv Oblast, 150 in Chernihiv Oblast, 350 in Volyn Oblast, 250 in Polissia, and more than 100 in Halychyna. It is probably for this reason that Old Norse sources spoke of Kievan Rus' as Garðaríki, the "realm of (fortified) towns". Some of these towns were small, serving to protect a single house, or were the castle of a "deliberate husband" ("нарочитого мужа"), while others occupied a large territory and could have a large number of defenders. According to Soviet urban researcher Mikhail Tikhomirov (1956), there were 89 towns in Kievan Rus' in the 11th century; another 134 new towns arose in the 12th century; and on the even of the Mongol invasion of Kievan Rus' (1237–1240), the realm had about 300 urban centres in total.

Cities initially had an important defensive function, protecting border regions from incursions by steppe peoples. They also became increasingly significant in the process of state formation. The construction of fortifications required substantial resources and the coordinated labour of large groups of people. Communities involved in building and maintaining these defences developed forms of collective organisation responsible for their use and protection. Economic activity was therefore closely connected with military needs. Cities became centres for their surrounding territories and exercised considerable political and administrative influence over them. This relationship is reflected in the chronicle statement that “whatever the elders decide, the suburbs will accept.” With the spread of Christianity in Kievan Rus', towns began to develop around large monasteries.

The social composition of the towns of Kievan Rus' was diverse, as was typical of medieval society. The urban population can broadly be divided into two groups: the lower classes and the urban elite. The latter included princes, boyars, senior clergy, and merchants. The lower classes, consisting mainly of craftsmen, small traders, and ordinary clergy, formed the largest segment of the population. Most townspeople were personally free, although some craftsmen were dependent on boyars, merchants, or other patrons. Free craftsmen, including blacksmiths, potters, jewellers, and armourers, as well as small traders, paid taxes or fulfilled labour obligations by participating in the construction and repair of urban fortifications and helping to maintain them. Churches were built and parishes supported at the expense of the urban population.

The free artisan population was not homogeneous in its composition. Among the general mass of artisans, there were wealthier masters who had apprentices or students dependent on them. Crafts began to emerge in patriarchal families as home industries, with the aim of providing themselves and their relatives with the simplest everyday items: linen fabrics, leather, tableware, footwear, etc. These products did not leave the family and were not sold. In the process of further social division of labour, home crafts emerged as a separate branch of the national economy - craft production. Craftsmen gradually began to manufacture products not only for the domestic consumption of the patriarchal family, but also for exchange. They paid less attention to agriculture, gradually losing their connection with farming as they moved to urban areas.

Craftsmen settled in towns with their families in separate quarters, slobodas (settlements), and streets organized according to occupation, such as those of potters, blacksmiths, and armourers. Craft production reached its peak in the 11th and 12th centuries, when several dozen specialized trades were practiced in Kievan Rus'. Because of the high demand for iron goods, including agricultural tools and weapons, mining and metallurgy were among the most important branches of craft production. At the time, metallurgy was often closely connected with metalworking.

== Crafts ==
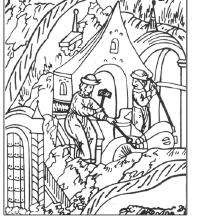
Metalworking in the times of Kievan Rus'.

Craft production achieved significant expansion and a high level of development in Kievan Rus'. Its main branch was metallurgy, which, along with agriculture, laid the foundation for the economic progress of the Kievan Rus' state. The range of iron products included about 150 items, and Kievan Rus' blacksmiths mastered all the technical and technological methods of iron processing known at the time: forging, welding, quenching, inlaying with non-ferrous metals. The iron industry of the early Slavs of southern Eastern Europe and Kievan Rus' was based on and widely developed from meadow and marsh ores of brown iron ore. The rich heritage of the Scythian world, including its craft traditions, had influence the culture of the tribes that inhabited this territory in the following era.

The development of early Slavic and Kievan Rus' iron metallurgy and metalworking had a fairly solid technical and technological foundation, laid down in ancient times. Slavic craftsmen mastered the raw iron production method, perfected various types of metallurgical furnaces (including productive furnaces with slag discharge), and mastered numerous blacksmithing techniques. This was facilitated by the widespread occurrence of meadow and bog iron ores in the Ukrainian forest-steppe (Zhytomyr Oblast, Chernihiv Oblast, Kyiv Oblast, Volyn Oblast and others).

There were powerful iron-producing centres, which were discovered by archaeologists at the Raikivets (Berdychev) and Lenkovets (Chernivtsi) settlements, in Gorodesk, Plisnesk, and elsewhere. The scale of these developments indicates the commercial nature of iron production. In addition to powerful ore mining centres, the South-Eastern Slavs were characterised by numerous small-scale developments near the vast majority of settlements, which met the needs of the inhabitants of a single village or group of villages. In most cases, local metallurgists themselves were engaged in ore extraction, enrichment, charcoal burning and processing of the metal obtained. The steady development of iron metallurgy in Kievan Rus', with periods of rapid growth in the production of small iron tools, was interrupted during the Mongol invasion and only began to revive in the 14th-15th centuries, when Zhytomyr Polissia became one of the largest centres of iron ore mining.

Blacksmiths used a wide range of tools and employed numerous metalworking techniques, producing high-quality functional objects, some of which also displayed a high level of artistic craftsmanship.

Iron was the only metal mined within the territory of Kievan Rus' and was used primarily for weapons and tools. Copper and tin were imported from the Caucasus and Asia Minor, while lead was obtained mainly from Bohemia. Church bells were cast in copper, and church roofs were sometimes covered with sheets of lead or tin. Copper was also used to make household items such as cauldrons, basins, and candlesticks, while lead was used for seals.

Silver was imported from several regions, including Bohemia, Siberia via routes across the Urals, the Caucasus, and the Byzantine Empire. Gold was acquired through trade and warfare with the Byzantines and Polovtsians. Both metals were used for coinage, seals, and vessels such as bowls, cups, and goblets. Such objects were generally accessible only to princes and other wealthy members of society. The Church was also an important consumer of gold and silver objects. In addition to chalices and other liturgical vessels, clergy commissioned gold and silver crosses, as well as decorative frames for icons and Gospel books used in worship. Some cathedral churches had gilded domes, while parts of their interior walls and partitions were occasionally faced with gold or silver plates.

Although metal reserves, except for iron, were scarce in Kievan Rus', the art of metallurgy reached a high level. In the early period, the Antes people were renowned as skilled weaponsmiths, and in the 9th and 10th centuries, their traditions were continued by the Polans. Smelters and smithies, casters and blacksmiths are mentioned on various occasions in many sources of that period. In Kiev in the 12th century, smithies occupied a special part of the city, and the city gates in this area were called Kuznetski. In Novgorod at the beginning of the 13th century, there were skilled casters, nail makers and craftsmen who made shields.

Rus' jewellers achieved a high level of craftsmanship. The jewellery in Kievan Rus' are precious items with cloisonné enamels, icons, crosses, princely bars and goblets. The production of artistic and valuable jewellery with enamel was concentrated in Kiev, from where it spread throughout Rus' and beyond. The fame of Rus' jewellers spread throughout medieval Europe.

Among the most common crafts were pottery and the working of leather, wood, and bone. Craftsmen engaged in these trades often settled together, forming distinct quarters in larger towns. Window glass also became increasingly widespread. Household production was common and included spinning, weaving, the making of everyday clothing and utensils, and food processing, especially the milling of grain.

Developments in woodworking, stoneworking, and brick production enabled the construction of a variety of dwellings, churches, and palaces in Kievan Rus'. The simplest dwellings were semi-dugouts, typically inhabited by poorer members of society, while wealthier townspeople lived in above-ground log houses. Churches, most of which were wooden, were prominent features of the built environment in both towns and villages. In larger cities, stone churches formed important architectural landmarks. More than 30 stone churches were built in Kyiv during the Kievan Rus' period, with many others constructed in Chernihiv and Pereiaslavl.

The socio-economic, political and cultural life of Kievan Rus' was concentrated in cities. The vast majority of their inhabitants were craftsmen of various specialities, who were united in corporations similar to Western European guilds. Many townspeople were engaged in trade. City markets were also the main squares where life was bustling. They were the gathering places for townspeople's assemblies (vicha), which, starting in the mid-12th century, played a significant role in the social and political life of their cities, and even the entire region, as was the case in Kiev, Halych, Chernigov, Veliky Novgorod, Vladimir on the Klyazma, and elsewhere.

The cities of Kievan Rus' were important cultural centres, with schools, scriptoria, libraries, icon painting, and other forms of applied art. Chronicles were compiled in cities such as Kyiv, Novgorod, and Vladimir on the Klyazma, where works of hagiography and other literary texts were also produced.

== Trade and money circulation ==
=== Trading partners and commodities ===
The state of agriculture and craft production determined the level of development of both domestic and foreign trade. The largest trade routes were the Route from the Varangians to the Greeks, which connected Rus' with the Baltic and Black Sea markets; the Salt Road and the Iron Road, which led to Galicia and the Caucasus. The route from Kiev to Halych to Prague to Regensburg connected Kievan Rus' with the countries of Central and Western Europe. The Silk and Volga trade routes led to the east. They connected Scandinavia, Western and Central Europe with Eastern, Near and Central Asia. To Byzantine merchants, Kiev was the main trade centre in Rus'.

The main trade routes of Kievan Rus' in the late 10th century

Traditionally, trade was called ‘gostba’, the traders themselves, or merchants, were called "gosti", and the places of trade were called ‘pogosti’. Later, after the adoption of Christianity, churches began to be built near pogosti, and cemeteries were arranged next to them. Merchants-guests were traditionally respected, and the population and the state highly valued their work. In the 9th-12th centuries, the penalty for killing a merchant was 12 hryvnias in silver, which was twice as much as for a simple serf (smerd).

Kievan Rus' supplied international markets with fur, honey, wax, leather, certain types of handicrafts, agricultural products, and slaves. To Byzantium in particular, the Rus' exported fur pelts, wax, honey, and slaves. From Constantinople, they imported jewellery (such as gold, silver, bracelets, glass beads, goblets and other vessels and tableware), precious fabrics (such as silks, satins, and brocades), "amphorae filled with wines, olive oil, and naphtha", spices, fruits, and nuts, Christian religious items (including icons, glazed tiles and marble for decorating churches), and weapons. The main trading partners of the Kievan Rus' state were Byzantium, Volga-Kama Bulgaria, Khazaria, the countries of the Arab East, Scandinavia, and Central and Western Europe.

In Kievan Rus', there were merchant associations that specialised in trade with certain countries or certain types of goods. The merchant corporations of ‘grechniki’ and ‘zalozniki’ traded with Byzantium and the countries of the Caucasus. In Kiev, Novgorod, Smolensk, Volodymyr (in Volyn') and other cities, there were trading houses of foreign merchants.

=== Coinage and other means of exchange ===
As a result of the development of trade in Kievan Rus', money appeared. As a means of exchange, money had existed among the Eastern Slavs for quite some time, long before the formation of the Old Rus' state. In ancient times, the Southern Slavs used animals instead of money for exchange, which is why metal money was later also called ‘cattle,’ and the princely treasury was called ‘cattle pen.’ In the northern regions, where the population was engaged in hunting, the fur of valuable animals, in particular the marten - ‘kuna’ - served as money. Over time, this name was also applied to metal money.

In Kievan Rus', coinage was rarely used, and Arab and Byzantine gold and silver coins were used, mainly for foreign trade. Silver and copper ingots were much more widespread within the country. Thus, from the 11th century, the unit known as the ‘hryvnia’ was used, which was a silver ingot weighing one pound, or approximately 400 g. The hryvnia was cut in half, and each half was called a “ruble” or ‘ruble hryvnia’. The ingot was stamped with the prince's mark, which indicated its weight. The ‘ruble’ was then divided into two parts - two poltinas, and then into two more halves - two quarter rubles. The names of small monetary units long retained echoes of the so-called ‘fur money’: rizana, skora (skin), bela (squirrel), ushki, mordki, etc.

The practice of credit transactions is reflected in legislation. The text of Ruska Pravda contains such concepts as ‘friendship loan’, ‘lending money at interest’, “interest”, ‘trade on credit’, ‘long-term and short-term credit’, ‘profit’, and the procedure for debt repayment was defined. It was considered unchristian to charge high interest rates on loans. When, at the beginning of the 12th century, creditors began to charge 50% per annum, the population of Kiev protested against such terms of the agreement, and Grand Prince Volodimer' Monomakh was forced to intervene. He adopted the ‘Charter on Interest,’ according to which the interest rate on debt could not exceed 20%. It was forbidden to enslave semi-dependent people who were working off their debt to the lender. The same charter prohibited parasitic usury. Volodimer' Monomakh's Charter legally completed the creation of the feudal system in Kievan Rus'.

Economic exchange took place between different lands of Kievan Rus', which helped to provide food, raw materials and handicrafts to those areas where they were not produced. Cities and large trading villages had markets. In large urban centres, they operated continuously, and in Kiev, Veliky Novgorod, Chernigov, Halych, Smolensk, Vladimir on the Klyazma, and others, they were held almost daily.

The main direction of foreign trade of Kievan Rus' was to the east. The Greek route led to Byzantium, and the Iron Route led to the countries of the Caucasus and the Arab East. There was also extensive trade with the countries of the Volga region: the Khazar Khaganate and Volga Bulgaria. Kievan Rus' had regular trade contacts with Germany, Hungary, Bohemia, and Poland. Kiev was the main centre of trade with the countries of the South and West.

The main means of payment in domestic and foreign trade in Kievan Rus' in the 9th-11th centuries were foreign coins, mainly Arab silver kufic dirhams. Byzantine miliaresia and Western European denarii were also used, albeit in smaller quantities. Several attempts were made in Kievan Rus' to introduce its own coinage. However, the minting of Old Rus' coins was very modest in volume; they were intended not so much for trade as to serve as a kind of calling card for the above-mentioned princes, promoting the Kievan Rus' Christian state and its rulers.

== See also ==
- Money of Kievan Rus'
- Foreign trade of medieval Novgorod
- Byzantine economy
- Economy of ancient Greece
- Economy of the Pskov Republic
- Economy of Galicia–Volhynia
- Economy of the Cossack Hetmanate

== Sources ==
- Н. Я. Аристов, «Промышленность древней Руси » Спб. 1866
- Hajko H.I., Biletskyj V.S., Історія гірництва: Підручник. (History of Mining: Textbook). Kyiv-Alchevsk: Publishing House ‘Kyiv-Mohyla Academy’, Publishing House ‘LADO’ Donetsk State Technical University (2013). 542 pp.
- Subtelny, Orest (2009). Ukraine: A History. Fourth Edition. Toronto: University of Toronto Press. ISBN 978-1-4426-0991-4.
- Martin, J. (2004). Treasure of the Land of Darkness: The Fur Trade and Its Significance for Medieval Russia. Cambridge University Press. ISBN 978-0-521-54811-3. (based on her 1980 PhD dissertation, originally published in 1986)
- Martin, Janet (2007). Medieval Russia: 980–1584. Second Edition. E-book. Cambridge: Cambridge University Press. ISBN 978-0-511-36800-4.
