= Economy of ancient Greece =

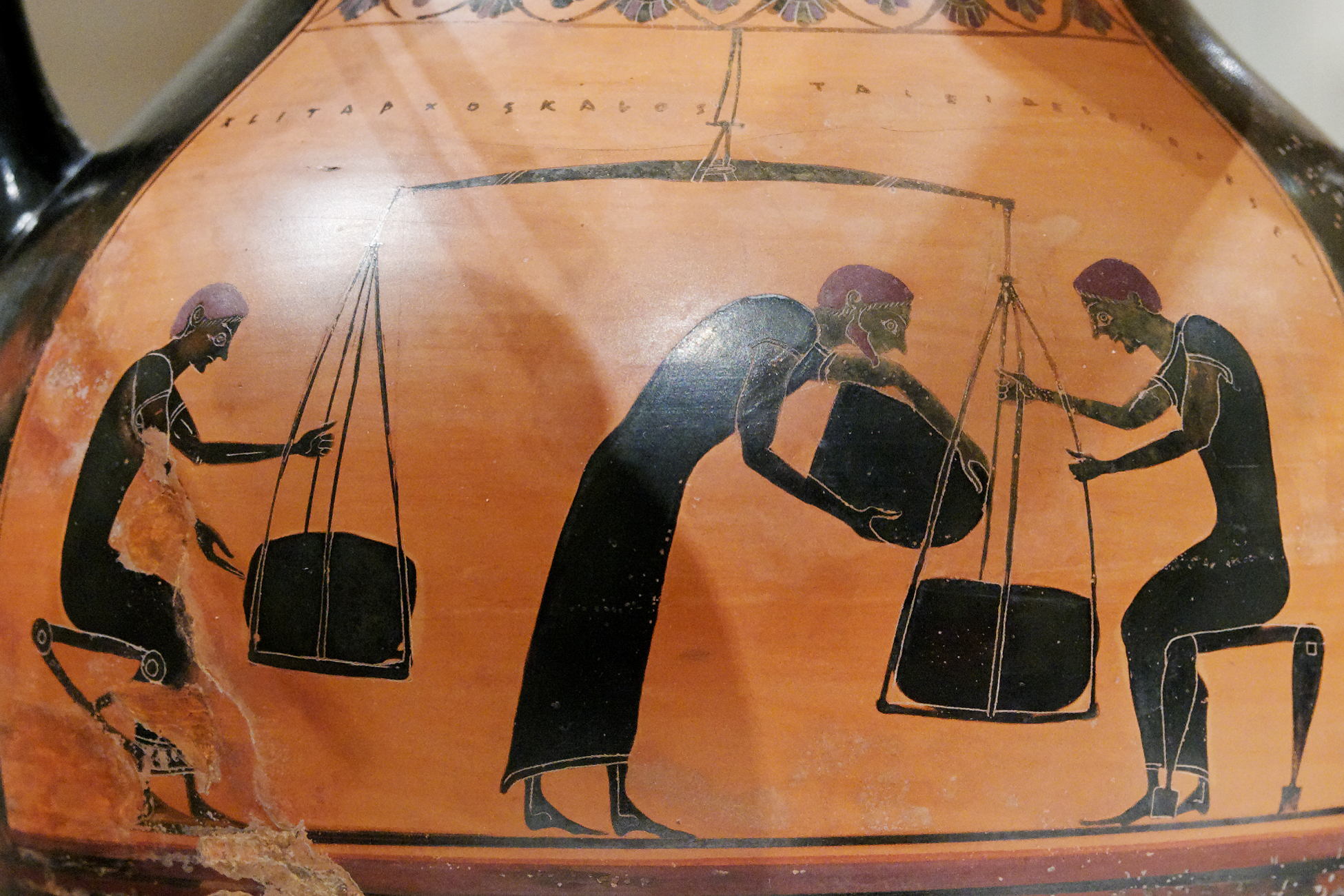
Men weighing merchandise, side B of an Attic black-figure amphora

The economy of ancient Greece was dominated by agricultural production and exchange. Most agricultural production was carried out in the countryside, while the cities or poleis were net consumers. There was enough fertile soil and winter rainfall on the ancient Greek mainland for agricultural production, despite the fact that the region is relatively mountainous and has generally small rivers.

Agricultural trade was of particular importance. The impact of limited crop production was somewhat offset by Greece's paramount location, as its position in the Mediterranean gave its provinces control over some of Egypt's most crucial seaports and trade routes. Beginning in the 6th century BCE, trade craftsmanship and commerce, principally maritime, became pivotal aspects of Greek economic output.

== Agriculture ==
Until the 8th century BCE, the Greek mainland provided enough cultivatable soil to produce food for its inhabitants. However, during the transition from the Greek Dark Ages ((c. 1180–800 BCE) to the Archaic Greek period (c. 800 BCE–480 BCE) in the 8th century BCE, overpopulation occurred in many regions, which has been regarded as the driving factor of the Greek colonisation that then ensued until the 6th century BCE. Overseas settlements could not only house and feed the growing population, but also provide supplies of food and other materials back to the metropoleis the colonists originated from.

Some of the colonies established by Ancient Athens included the cleruchies of Asia Minor, which were important for controlling the supply of wheat. The Athenian polis could not have survived without grain from Ukraine. The olive tree and grapevine, as well as orchards, were complemented by the cultivation of herbs, vegetables, and oil-producing plants. Husbandry was badly developed due to a lack of available land. Sheep and goats were the most common types of livestock, while bees were kept to produce honey, the only source of sugar known to the ancient Greeks.

Up to 80% of the Greek population was employed in the agricultural industry. Agricultural work followed the rhythm of the seasons: harvesting olives and trimming grapevines at the beginning of autumn and the end of winter; setting aside fallow land in the spring; harvesting cereals in the summer; cutting wood, sowing seeds, and harvesting grapes in autumn.

In the ancient era, most lands were held by the aristocracy. During the 7th century BC, demographic expansion and the distribution of successions created tensions between these landowners and the peasants. In Athens, this was changed by Solon's reforms, which eliminated debt bondage and protected the peasantry. Nonetheless, a Greek aristocrat's domains remained small compared with the Roman latifundia.

== Crafts ==
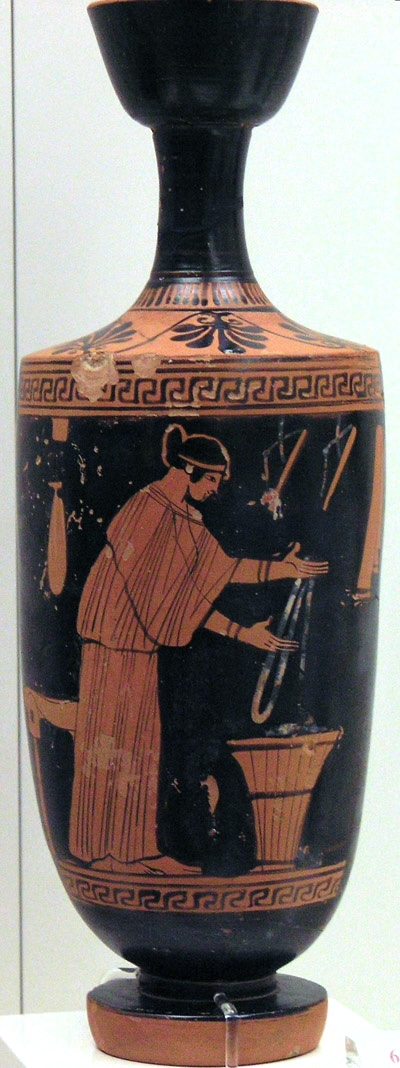
Woman working with wool, 480-470 BC, National Archaeological Museum of Athens

Much of the craftsmanship of ancient Greece was part of the domestic sphere. However, the situation gradually changed between the 8th and 4th centuries BC, with the increased commercialization of the Greek economy. Thus, weaving and baking, activities so important to the Western late medieval economy, were done only by women before the 6th century BC. After the growth of commerce, slaves started to be used widely in workshops. Only fine dyed tissues, like those made with Tyrian purple, were created in workshops. On the other hand, working with metal, leather, wood, or clay was a specialized activity that was looked down upon by most Greeks.

The basic workshop was often family-operated. Lysias's shield manufacture employed 350 slaves; Demosthenes' father, a maker of swords, used 32. After the death of Pericles in 429 BC, a new class emerged: that of the wealthy owners and managers of workshops. Examples include Cleon and Anytus, noted tannery owners, and Kleophon, whose factory produced lyres.

Non-slave workers were paid by assignment since the workshops could not guarantee regular work. In Athens, those who worked on state projects were paid one drachma per day, no matter what craft they practised. The workday generally began at sunrise and ended in the afternoon.

=== Pottery ===
The potter's work consisted of selecting the clay, fashioning the vase, drying and painting and baking it, and then applying varnish. Part of the production went to domestic usage (dishes, containers, oil lamps) or for commercial purposes, and the rest served religious or artistic functions. Techniques for working with clay have been known since the Bronze Age; the potter's wheel is a very ancient invention. The ancient Greeks did not add any innovations to these processes.

The creation of artistically decorated vases in Greece had strong foreign influences. For instance, the famed black-figure style of Corinthian potters was most likely derived from the Syrian style of metalworking. The heights to which the Greeks brought the art of ceramics is, therefore, due entirely to their artistic sensibilities and not to technical ingenuity.

Pottery in ancient Greece was most often the work of slaves. Many of the potters of Athens assembled between the agora and the Dipylon, in the Kerameikon. They most often operated as small workshops, consisting of a master, several paid artisans, and slaves.

== Trade ==
Greece's main exports were wine, pottery, and metalwork. Imports included grains and pork from Sicily, Arabia, Egypt, Ancient Carthage, and the Bosporan Kingdom.

Archaeobotanist Helmut J. Kroll (2000) stated that olives and olive oil, first introduced in Greece in the late Bronze Age from the Levant, were probably too precious to be traded on a large scale, as there is no evidence of olive pips in Thessaly, the mountains of Epirus, Macedon, and Thrace, outside the range of cultivation of olive trees near the Mediterranean coast. If anything, it was a rare, expensive, luxury product; in the inland regions where olives could not be grown, they were not imported, but replaced by flax (linseed), Camelina sativa (false flax) and poppy instead. (Note: "But the olive tree does not tolerate frost, wants to overlook the Mediterranean Sea, wants to smell the soft, moist and salty air and will not thrive far from the coast and in the north. In Thessaly, Macedonia and Thrakia, in the Epirus mountains, linseed, false flax and poppy replace the olive tree as source for vegetal fat. Outside the range of olive cultivation olive pips do not occur, neither in Kastanas nor in Assiros nor in Agios Mamas, nor in inner Thessaly. Inside this range they are common in every settlement. So there was surely no trade with olives; if olive oil was traded in amphores, it must have been very expensive, a luxury good but not an ingredient of daily bread.")

=== Maritime commerce ===
The main participants in Greek commerce were the class of traders known as emporoi (ἕμποροι). The state collected a duty on their cargo. At Piraeus (the main port of Athens), this tax was set initially at 1% or higher. By the end of the 5th century, the tax had been raised to 33 talents (Andocides, I, 133–134). In 413, Athens ended the collection of tribute from the Delian League and imposed a 5% duty on all the ports of her empire (Thucydides, VII, 28, 4) in the hope of increasing revenues. These duties were never protectionist, but were merely intended to raise money for the public treasury.

The growth of trade in Greece led to the development of financial techniques. Most merchants, lacking sufficient cash assets, resorted to borrowing to finance all or part of their expeditions. A typical loan for a large venture in 4th century BC Athens, was generally a large sum of cash (usually less than 2,000 drachmas), lent for a short time (the length of the voyage, a matter of several weeks or months), at a high rate of interest (often 12% but reaching levels as high as 100%). The terms of the contract were always laid out in writing, differing from loans between friends (eranoi). The lender bore all the risks of the journey, in exchange for which the borrower committed his cargo and his entire fleet, which were precautionarily seized upon their arrival at the port of Piraeus.

Trade in ancient Greece was free: the state controlled only the supply of grain. In Athens, following the first meeting of the new Prytaneis, trade regulations were reviewed, with a specialized committee overseeing the trade in wheat, flour, and bread.

One of the main drivers of trade in Ancient Greece was colonization. As larger city states set up colonies, there would be trade between the founding city and its colony. Furthermore, differing climates between cities and their respective colonies created comparative advantages in goods. For example, colonies in Sicily would often have better weather and be able to export grain to more populous cities. Larger city states often exported more value added goods, such as olive oil, back out to colonies.

The number of shipwrecks found in the Mediterranean Sea provides valuable evidence of the development of trade in the ancient world. Only two shipwrecks were found that dated from the 8th century BC. However, archaeologists have found forty-six shipwrecks dated from the 4th century BC, which would appear to indicate that there occurred a very large increase in the volume of trade between these centuries. Considering that the average ship tonnage also increased in the same period, the total volume of trade increased probably by a factor of 30.

=== Retail ===
While peasants and artisans often sold their wares, there were also retail merchants known as kápêloi (κάπηλοι). Grouped into guilds, they sold fish, olive oil, and vegetables. Women sold perfume or ribbons. Merchants were required to pay a fee for their space in the marketplace. They were viewed poorly by the general population, and Aristotle labelled their activities as: "a kind of exchange which is justly censured, for it is unnatural, and a mode by which men gain from one another."

Parallel to the "professional" merchants were those who sold the surplus of their household products such as vegetables, olive oil, or bread. This was the case for many of the small-scale farmers of Attica. Among townsfolk, this task often fell to the women. For instance, Euripides' mother sold chervil from her garden (cf. Aristophanes, The Acharnians, v. 477–478).

== Taxation ==
Direct taxation was not well-developed in ancient Greece. The eisphorá (εἰσφορά) was a tax on the wealth of the very rich, but it was levied only when needed — usually in times of war. Large fortunes were also subject to liturgies which was the support of public works. Liturgies could consist of, for instance, the maintenance of a trireme, a chorus during a theatre festival, or a gymnasium. In some cases, the prestige of the undertaking attracted volunteers (analogous in modern terminology to endowment, sponsorship, or donation). Such was the case for the choragus, who organized and financed choruses for a drama festival. In other instances, like the burden of outfitting and commanding a trireme, the liturgy functioned more like a mandatory donation (what we would today call a one-time tax), with the prestige of such a position and other elites' social pressure reducing noncompliance. In some cities, like Miletus and Teos, heavy taxation was imposed on citizens.

The eisphora was a progressive tax, as it was applied to only the wealthiest. The citizens had the ability to reject the taxation, if they believed there was someone else who was wealthier not being taxed. The wealthier would have to pay the liturgy.

On the other hand, indirect taxes were quite important. Taxes were levied on houses, slaves, herds and flocks, wines, and hay, among other things. The right to collect many of these taxes was often transferred to publicans, or telônai (τελῶναι). However, this was not true of all cities. Thasos' gold mines and Athens' taxes on business allowed them to eliminate these indirect taxes. Subjugated groups such as the Penestae of Thessaly and the Helots of Sparta were taxed by the city-states in which they resided.

== Currency ==
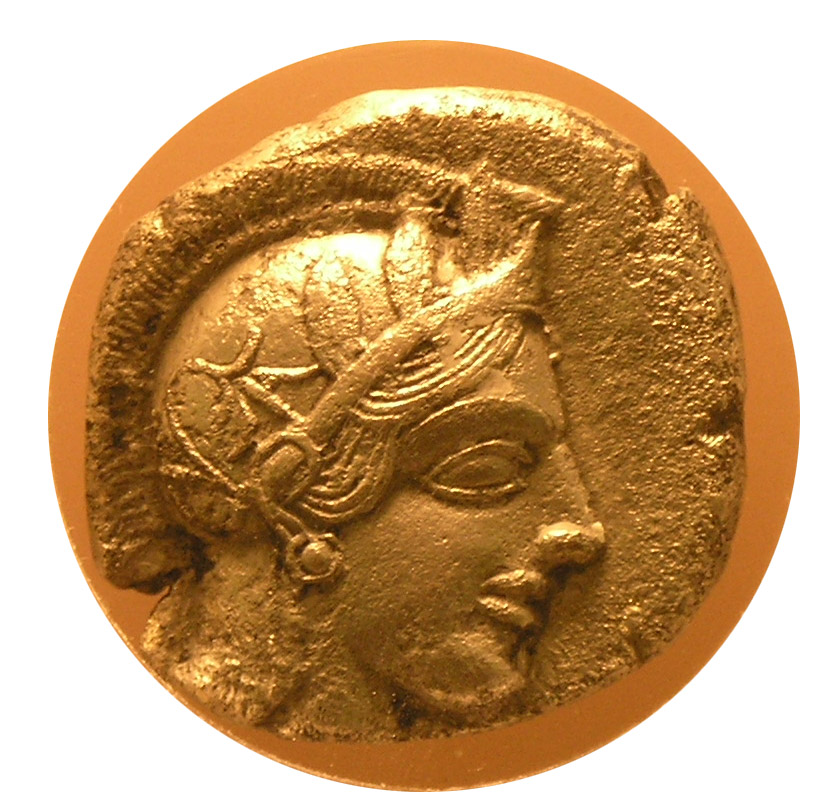
Athenian coin, Athenian Agora Museum

Coinage probably began in Lydia around the cities of Asia Minor under its control. Early electrum coins have been found at the Temple of Diana at Ephesus. The technique of minting coins arrived in mainland Greece around 550 BC, beginning with coastal trading cities like Aegina and Athens. Their use spread and the city-states quickly secured a monopoly on their creation. The very first coins were made from electrum (an alloy of gold and silver), followed by pure silver, the most commonly found valuable metal in the region. The mines of the Pangaeon hills allowed the cities of Thrace and Macedon to mint a large number of coins. Laurium's silver mines provided the raw materials for the "Athenian owls", the most famous coins of the ancient Greek world. Less-valuable bronze coins appeared at the end of the 5th century.

Coins played several roles in the Greek world. They provided a medium of exchange, mostly used by city-states to hire mercenaries and compensate citizens. They were also a source of revenue as foreigners had to change their money into the local currency at an exchange rate favourable to the State. They served as a mobile form of metal resources, which explains discoveries of Athenian coins with high levels of silver at great distances from their home city. Finally, the minting of coins lent an air of undeniable prestige to any Greek city or city-state.

== Shopping ==
The shopping centres in Ancient Greece were called agoras. The literal meaning of the word is "gathering place" or "assembly". The agora was the centre of the athletic, artistic, spiritual and political life of the city. The Ancient Agora of Athens was the best-known example. Early in Greek history (18th century–8th century BC), free-born citizens would gather in the agora for military duty or to hear statements of the ruling king or council. Every city had its agora where merchants could sell their products. There was linen from Egypt, Ivory from Africa, Spices from Syria, and more. Prices were rarely fixed, so bargaining was a common practice.

== See also ==
- Slavery in Ancient Greece
- Roman economy
- Economy of Greece
- Economy of Kievan Rus'
- Byzantine economy

== Sources ==
- Bresson, Alain. The Making of the Ancient Greek Economy: Institutions, Markets, and Growth In the City-States. Expanded and updated English edition. Translated by Steven Rendall. Princeton: Princeton University Press, 2015.
- Donlan, Walter. "The Homeric economy." In A new companion to Homer, edited by Ian Morris and Barry B. Powell, 649–67. New York: E.J. Brill, 1997.
- Finley, Moses I. The ancient economy. 2d ed. Sather Classical Lectures 48. Berkeley: Univ. of California Press, 1985.
- Foraboschi, Daniele. "The Hellenistic economy: indirect intervention by the state." In Production and Public Powers In Classical Antiquity, edited by Elio Lo Cascio and Dominic Rathbone, 37–43. Cambridge: Cambridge Philological Society, 2000.
- Adam Izdebski, Tymon Sloczyński, Anton Bonnier, Grzegorz Koloch, and Katerina Kouli. 2020. "Landscape Change and Trade in Ancient Greece: Evidence from Pollen Data." The Economic Journal.
- Kroll, Helmut Johannes (2000). "Agriculture and Arboriculture in Mainland Greece at the Beginning of the First Millenium B.C." Pallas (52). Presses Universitaires du Midi: 61–68. ISSN 0031-0387. JSTOR 43606826.
- Meikle, Scott. Aristotle's economic thought. Oxford: Clarendon, 1995.
- Migeotte, Léopold. The economy of the Greek cities: From the Archaic period to the early Roman Empire. Berkeley: Univ. of California Press, 2009.
- Morris, Ian. "The Athenian economy twenty years after The ancient economy." Classical Philology 89, no. 4 (1994): 351–66.
- Pomeroy, Sarah B. Xenophon's Oeconomicus: A social and historical commentary. Oxford: Clarendon, 1994.
- Scheidel, Walter, Ian Morris, and Richard Saller, eds. The Cambridge economic history of the Greco-Roman world. Cambridge, UK: Cambridge Univ. Press, 2007.
- Scheidel, Walter, and Sitta von Reden. The Ancient Economy. Hoboken: Taylor and Francis, 2012.

== Bibliography ==
- Scheidel, Walter, Ian Morris, and Richard P. Saller, eds. The Cambridge Economic History of the Greco-Roman World (2008) 958pp
- Sideris, Athanasios (2015). "Sideris, Athanasios, Principles and Practice in Classical World's Economy". Masaryk University. (45 pp., a concise overview for students)
