= Peterhof (Novgorod) =

Hanseatic kontor in Novgorod

The Peterhof or Petershof (Middle Low German and modern German for "Peter's courtyard"; Russian: немецкий двор; Latin: curia sancti Petri) was a Hanseatic kontor, one of the four major trading posts of the Hanseatic League, on the right bank of the Volkhov at Novgorod, Russia, then forming the Novgorod Republic. It was named after St. Peter's Church, a Catholic church that was used by the Hanseatic merchants. It eventually consisted of two parts, the palisaded enclave, called the Peterhof proper, further uphill from the river Volkhov, and a beachyard, the Gotenhof, on the river that was eventually included in the Peterhof. Baltic trade, including Novgorod's trade, was dominated by the Hanseatic League from the 13th to 15th centuries. It was first shut down in 1494 by Ivan III of Russia, but later reopened in 1514, although a terminal decline could not be halted.

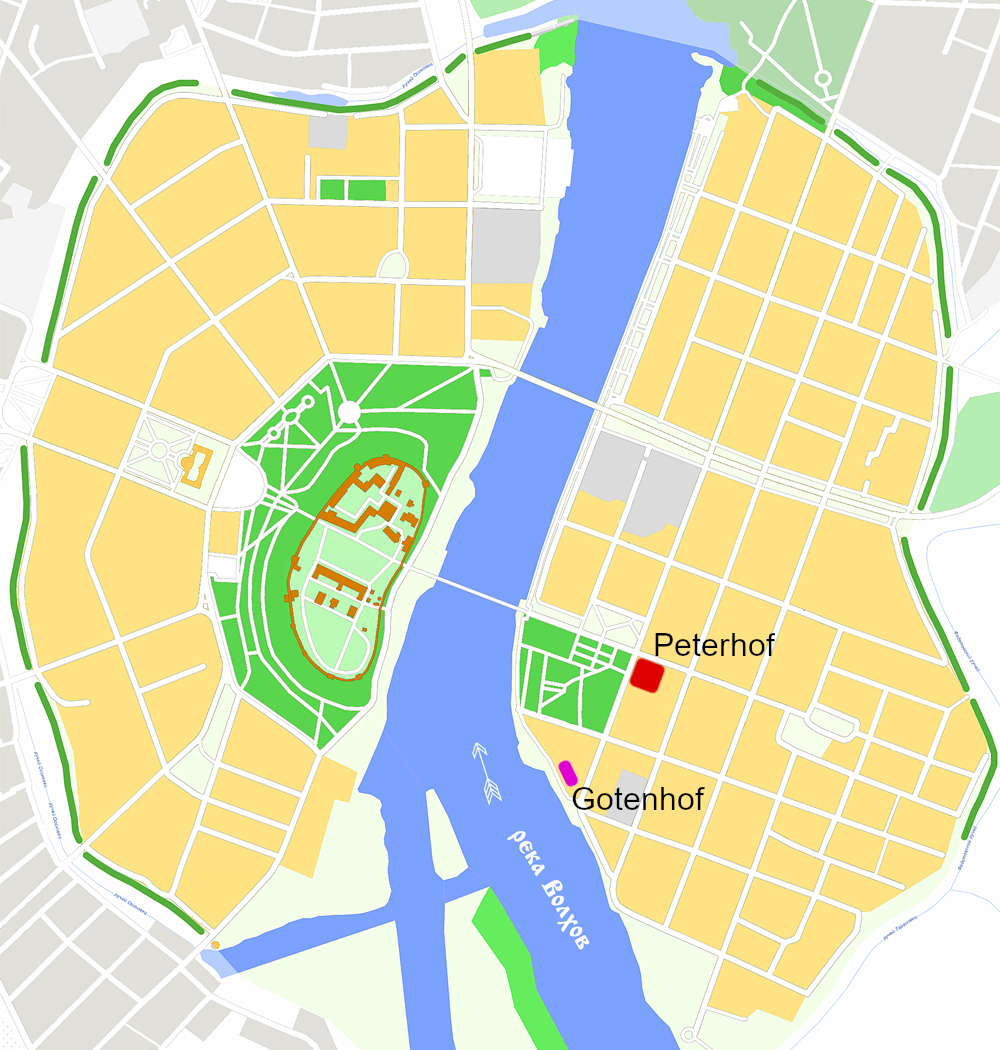
Map of modern Veliky Novgorod, showing the site of the Peterhof in red and the site of the Gotenhof in pink.

A kontor was a corporation (universitas) with a level of legal autonomy, the code of the Peterhof was called the schra. It was established around 1200 by traders from the Holy Roman Empire who earlier had used the Gotenhof. The Peterhof maintained special ties with Visby, although Lübeck tried to take over control only with partial success. Visby and Lübeck were in the 15th century sidelined by the Livonian towns. Ships from the Baltic accessed Novgorod over the Neva, Lake Ladoga and the Volkhov. Transport over land was in winter by sleighs, moving to Dorpat via Pskov.

The most important export good was fur, but beeswax, timber, honey and resin were also exported. Imports to Novgorod included herring, Flemish broadcloth, metals such as silver, salt and wine. Novgorod had an elaborate system to supply squirrel furs.

Although the Hanseatic residents did not live in complete isolation from the natives of Novgorod, the Peterhof was the most spatially segregated kontor. It and the Gotenhof were surrounded by a wooden palissade with one gate, the enclave bordered the market of Novgorod. There were strict regulations on contact with outsiders: Russian men were not allowed into the courtyard at night; however, Russian women were allowed into the kontor's bathhouse and German apprentices learnt Russian as servants for boyars. German boys also lived with farmers to learn the Russian language.

== History ==
=== Slavic and Scandinavian trade ===
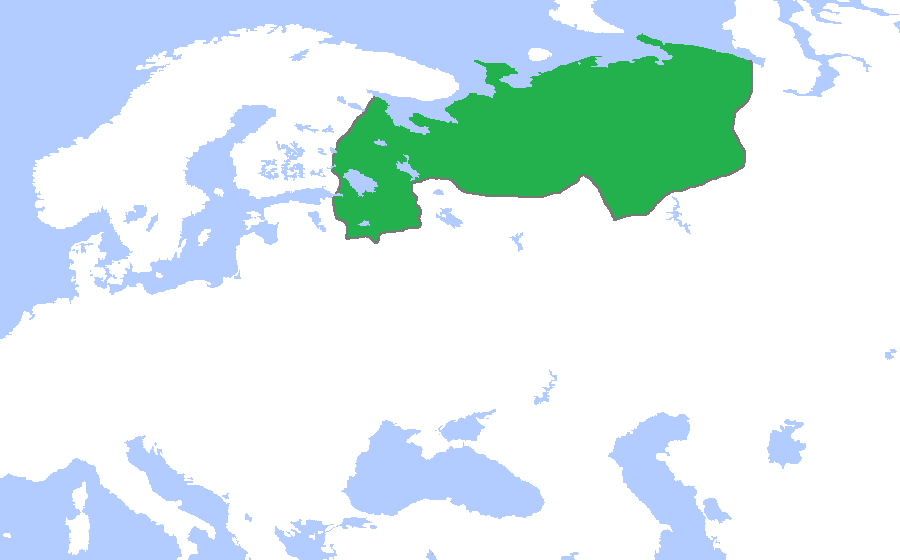
The Novgorod Republic c. 1400. Novgorod was a republic with control over vast territories and extracted furs, especially of squirrels, in a number of ways. It controlled much of the fur trade with Europe.

Novgorod had grown into an important merchant city over the 11th century. Scandinavian merchants dominated the Baltic trade for most of the 12th century and the Gutnic or Gotlanders had a big role. Their most important city was Visby on Gotland. The Scandinavian-Gotlandic traders had a trading post in Novgorod called the Gutagard or Gotenhof, also called St. Olav's Hof. From the middle of the 12th century traders of the northern Holy Roman Empire began to trade in Visby and formed the Gotlandic Association or the association of merchants from the Holy Roman Empire visiting Gotland. The Gotlandic Association could use this through an agreement with Visby.

=== Hanseatic trade in Novgorod and the Peterhof ===
The German merchants of the Gotlandic Association managed to overtake competitors (other Scandinavians) before 1200. German traders were organised in merchant guilds (universitates mercatorum) called hansas. Around that time they also got their own trading post, the Peterhof, on a lease. The St. Peter's Church was located there, it was also used as a storage place for the post's archive, coffers and valuable trading goods. This was something that also happened at other kontors. The church could be so crammed with storage that it became eventually necessary to forbid stacking goods on the altar. The Peterhof had a considerable degree of legal autonomy, although its court of appeal was located in Visby, and created its own code of regulations, the schra. It was stricter than other kontors' regulations on contact with outsiders and its head, the alderman, had greater and more absolute authority than the aldermen of other kontors. This may owe to the Peterhof's remoteness and isolation.

The German hansas gradually coalesced into the Hanseatic League over the 13th century.

Procopius of Ustyug was a Hanseatic trader before he converted to the Russian Orthodox church and became a holy fool or fool for Christ.

==== Consolidation attempt of Lübeck ====
Westphalian merchants were important in Novgorod, and this was seen as a threat by Lübeck, a city that was a central hub for trade from the Baltic with the Holy Roman Empire and the North Sea lands and that tried to consolidate a critical role in the Hanseatic League. It tried to establish full control over the Baltic trade during the 1290s. In 1293 it made a failed effort to move the Peterhof's court of appeal to Lübeck, instead a compromise was made to have the court take place in annual turns in Visby or Lübeck. Then in 1299 it banned the Gotlandic Association from using its own seal. This effectively ended the Gotlandic Association. Visby and Lübeck continued to vie over control of the Peterhof for the next century and a half.

The Gotenhof was acquired by the Hansards at a lease in the 14th century and it was made part of the Peterhof.

Around the middle of the 14th century, all trader settlements including the Peterhof were formally subordinated to the Diet's decisions, and their envoys also received the right to attend and speak at Diets but they lacked voting power.

==== Conflict and blockades ====
The Hanseatic League got into conflict with the Russian principalities in the 1380s over the unequal trading privileges. The Russian princes secured trading privileges in 1392 in Livonia and on Gotland in exchange for renewing the German privileges.

All German traders in the kontor were imprisoned in 1424. 36 of them died. Arrests and seizures in Novgorod were particularly violent, although this was a rare happening. In response the Hansa could call for an embargo or blockade. Because of a war between Novgorod and the Livonian Order, the Hanseatic League blockaded Novgorod and abandoned the Peterhof for six years, from 1443 to 1448.

==== Decline of the fur trade and closure ====
In the 15th century, the Livonian towns led by Dorpat and Reval contested the compromise between Lübeck and Visby and prevailed from 1442 onwards.

The fur trade of Novgorod declined in the second half of the 15th century. Political conflict between Hansards and Novgorod was one factor. The Hanseatic League was also reluctant to export silver to Novgorod because of a decline in central European silver production. But the earlier success of Novgorod's squirrel trade had also lowered prices and in the early 15th century this allowed the lower classes to purchase squirrel fur, and wealthier tastes moved to other more luxury types of fur like sable. Novgorod was poorly placed to get sable fur because of territorial losses to Muscovy. The kontor and Hanseatic trade in Novgorod as a result declined strongly over the course of the 15th century.

Tsar Ivan III of Moscow during and after his annexation of Novgorod confiscated massive areas of Novgorodian land and tried to move trade over to Moscow. The consequence of this was the dismantling of Novgorod's squirrel fur supply network.

Ivan III closed the Hanseatic kontor at Novgorod in 1494 and deported its merchants to Moscow. It was an attempt to reduce Hanseatic influence on Russian trade. Ivan sought to open as many outlets for foreign trade as possible, which included his fortress of Ivangorod in the Baltic. At the time, only 49 traders were at the Peterhof. They were not freed until three years later and all died at sea on the journey home. The fur trade was redirected to Leipzig, taking out the Hansards; while the Hanseatic trade with Russia moved to Riga, Reval and Pskov. The closure of the office led to a trade blockade on Moscow. The cities of Livonia continued their trade through Pskov, with the merchants explaining to Lübeck that Pskov was not formally part of the Grand Principality of Moscow. When the Peterhof reopened in 1514, decline had set in and Novgorod was not a trade hub any longer. Its importance for Hanseatic trade gradually petered out. The kontor was in ruins by the mid-16th century.

== Organisation and social structure ==
The Peterhof in Novgorod was, like the other kontors, a legal person established as a merchant's corporation (universitas mercatorum). It had its own treasury, seal, code of rules, legal power to enforce rules on residents and administration. The Peterhof's seal showed the key of St. Peter.

=== Administration ===
The Peterhof originally had one alderman of the court (oldermann van de hof) at the head, who was the internal legal authority and a representative to the rest of the Hanseatic League and to local authorities. At first the Peterhof alderman was elected by the local merchants' general assembly. From 1346 at the latest the Peterhof's alderman alternatively came from and was appointed by Visby or Lübeck. The Drittel system of Bruges was never adopted. The alderman could appoint four assessors or deputies, called "wise men" (wisesten). He was also supported by the achteinen or Achtzehnmänner, who fulfilled special functions and could represent the kontor when needed.

Later the alderman of the court was abolished and replaced by two aldermen of the church, who left the kontor's administration to lower officials. When the Livonian towns gained authority over the Peterhof, the aldermen were replaced by the hofknecht as head, an appointee of the Livonian towns who was a permanent resident and could speak Russian.

In Novgorod the priest also performed secretarial duties. He was appointed in turn by Visby and Lübeck from 1346 at the latest, and from 1442 by Reval and Dorpat.

All visiting Hanseatic traders in Novgorod fell under the authority of the Peterhof's administration.

=== Law ===
The schra, the ordinance of the Peterhof, was the oldest attested code of regulations of any kontor. It was written in Middle Low German and recited to the trader community once a year. There were seven revisions of the code, the first appearing in the mid 13th century and the last in the beginning of the 17th. It regulated matters like the authority of the kontor leadership, trade, taxes, duties, rights and contact with natives and outsiders.

Trade was strictly regulated by the kontor's administration because of the limited supply of export goods. Only 200 merchants were allowed at most and a merchant could only stay during the winter or the summer in each year. Allowed imports were capped at 1000 Lübeck mark per merchant to prevent oversupply.

=== Life and policy ===
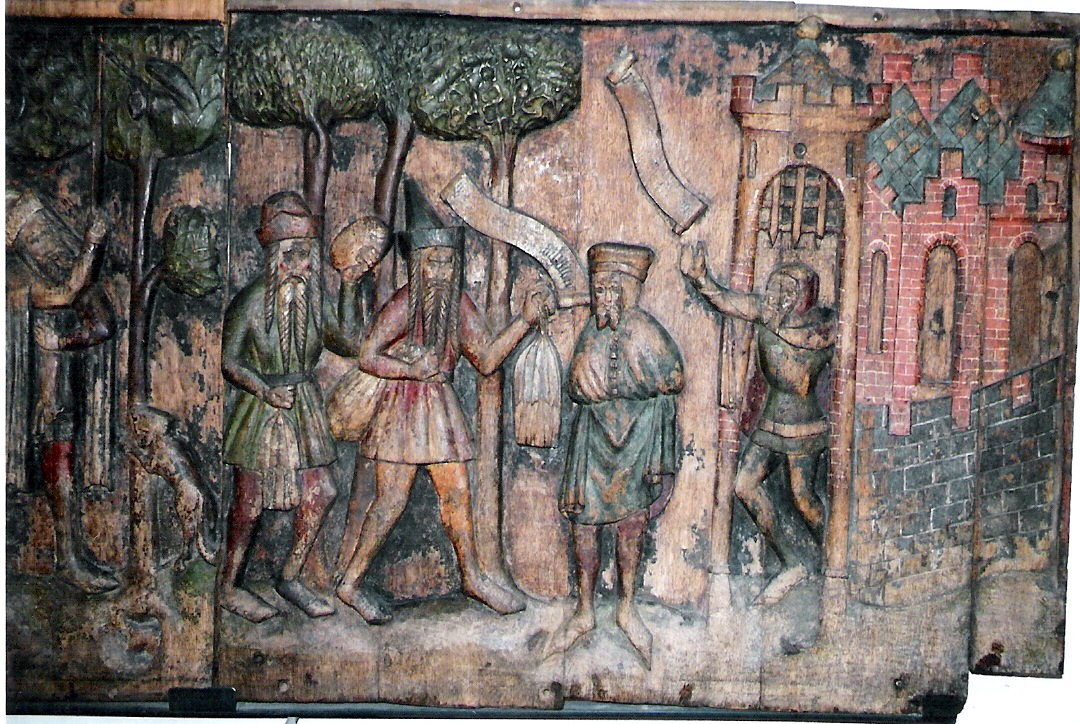
Hunters offer furs and honey to a merchant on the Rigafahrergestühl (de) in Stralsund.

Hanseatic men visiting the Peterhof were divided in a threefold hierarchy: masters, assistants or associates, and apprentices. Merchants rarely stayed longer than six months in the Peterhof. There were about 150 to 200 merchants total present each season, including masters, assistants and apprentices; each master had at least two assistants or apprentices. Only men were allowed as residents, although extramarital relationships with native women were tolerated.

The Peterhof was the most spatially segregated kontor. Not only were the Peterhof and the Gotenhof palisaded, contact with outsiders was strictly regulated: Russian men were only allowed into the courtyard during the day. This strict regulations was in part for the merchants' protection, because in Novgorod there was more severe violence and there were larger differences in language and religion with the local population than at other kontors. However the Hansard's life was not in complete isolation from the native population.

The stay in Peterhof was too short for merchants to learn Old Russian, so Hansards relied on interpreters and young Low German apprentices were placed as servants in the households of boyars for half a year to learn Russian. The Hanseatic League also tried to prevent non-Hanseatic foreign merchants from learning Russian.

== Structure and location ==
The Peterhof was situated on the right bank of the river Volkhov: the Peterhof proper was a quite large palisaded enclave in a corner of Novgorod's market. There was one entry gate. The St. Peter's Church was the main building. It was made of stone and served also as a storage area and a last line of defence. It was surrounded by all kinds of hutments where living quarters, offices, the meeting hall, a prison and a presbytery were located.

The nearby Gotenhof, St. Olav's Hof, was a small beachyard right by the river Volkhov. It was acquired by the Hanseatic traders in the 14th century and became legally part of the Peterhof.

=== Archeology ===
The location of the Peterhof was long not known. A survey identified the site in 2020 and it was excavated in 2022. The kontor existed between modernday Bolshaya Moskovskaya, Ilyina, Mikhailova and Nikolskaya streets. Thousands of objects have been retrieved.

== Trade ==
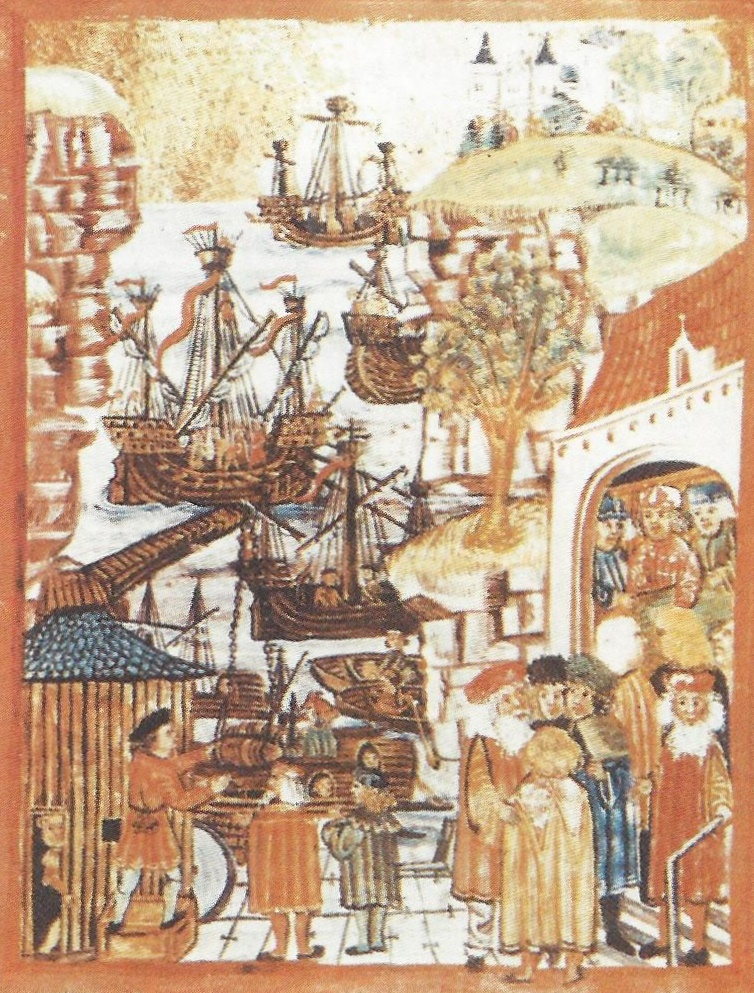
German district in Novgorod, 14th century

The most important trading good in Novgorod was fur, especially the white and grey fur of the red squirrel's winter pelt. Novgorod had developed a complex supply system where Novgorod's government, boyars and merchants extracted squirrel fur through rents, taxes and trade; it had evolved from earlier tributes from Finnic tribes. Hanseatic merchants bought the furs from Novgorodian traders. The Hansards preferred to transport furs over land. The Hanseatic role in the fur trade fell fast after the closure of the Peterhof by Ivan III.

Beeswax was another important product that Novgorod exported. It was used to make candles and was in very high demand by churches as result of intensified church building. Beeswax was harvested from wild bees in a vast area from Lviv to Kazan, so Novgorod always faced considerable competition on this market. It was usually shipped over sea.

The Hanseatic traders imported herring, metals, especially silver but also copper, tin and lead, salt, hop, Flemish broadcloth and wine to Novgorod.

Because Russian demand for western goods was limited, the Hansards couldn't avoid a trade imbalance, so large quantities of western silver flowed to Russia and further to Persia. This contributed to economic crises in the European economy.

== Sources ==
- Crummey, Robert O. (6 June 2014). The Formation of Muscovy 1300 - 1613. Routledge. ISBN 978-1-317-87200-9.
- Vovin, Alexei; Krom, Mikhail (17 February 2017). "The city of Pskov in the fourteenth and fifteenth centuries: Baltic trade and institutional growth". In Blockmans, Wim; Krom, Mikhail; Wubs-Mrozewicz, Justyna (eds.). The Routledge Handbook of Maritime Trade around Europe 1300-1600: Commercial Networks and Urban Autonomy. Taylor & Francis. pp. 313–330. ISBN 978-1-315-27856-8.
