= Money of Kievan Rus' =

The history of money in Kievan Rus' is divided into two main phases:

- the period of use of foreign silver coins (from the 9th century to the beginning of the 12th century); and
- the coinless period (from 12th century).

== 9th – early 12th century ==
The fur of small fur animals has long been one of the main types of monetary substitutes. It was highly valued in other countries, which allowed for a profitable trade. Also known as a substitute for money were small cowries shells (Cypraea). But nevertheless finds of skins and shells come across not so often. The basis of all the treasures dating back to this period were foreign silver coins.

Together with the emergence of the first ancient settlements in the late 8th - early 9th century, foreign coins appeared on Slavic lands of Eastern Europe. The formation of money circulation started when active trade in Northern and Eastern Europe with the countries of the Caliphate began. Eastern European countries, deprived of large ore reserves of monetary metal, actively imported silver. In the first third of the 9th century, coins (dirhams) which were minted in the African centers of the Caliphate and which reached Rus' via the Caucasus and Central Asian trade routes became widespread in Kievan Rus'. Dirhams were used as a means of payment, worn as jewelry and melted down. Old East Slavic mentions of a щьляг (shchĭlyag) or скълѧѕь (skŭlędzĭ), probably derived from West Germanic schilling, shilling or shekel (a pound in Hebrew), likely refer to dirhams. In the northern regions, Western European denarius of German, English and Scandinavian coinage came to replace dirhams. They were in circulation until the beginning of the 12th century, when the circulation of foreign coins ceased, most likely due to a decrease in the silver sample, and replaced by silver bars (grivna), held out until the middle of the 14th century.

The main means of circulation in Rus' (Kiev, Chernigov, Smolensk, etc.) were cuttings from dirhams weighing 1.38 grams (Rezanas), which were 1/200 of Byzantine litras. Similar cuttings were used on the lands of Rus', but their weight was 1.04 grams or 1/200 silver grivna.

At the turn of the 10th - 11th centuries at the time of Vladimir the Great and Svyatopolk was made an attempt to stamp Rus' coins.

=== Grivna – Kuna monetary system ===
The early grivna could be divided into 20 nogatÿ, 25 kunÿ, or 50 rezanÿ. It has been thought that these names derived from various types of fur that these coins could be exchanged for, as the word kuna (Church Slavonic: кѹна́, modern Russian and Ukrainian: ку́на) originally meant a marten-skin. For example, in the Primary Chronicle, Oleg the Wise, prince of Kiev, is reported sub anno 6391 (883) as having subjugated the Derevlians, and imposing upon them 'the tribute of a black marten-skin apiece'. (Note: Church Slavonic: поча на нихъ имати по чьрнѣ кунѣ, romanized: pocha na nikhŭ imati po chĭrně kuně.) Similarly sub anno 6488 (980) is recorded: 'And Volodimir' said to them: 'Wait, until for you the kunȳ (translated as "marten-skins" or "money") will be collected in a month'. (Note: Church Slavonic: И рече имъ Володимиръ: "Пожьдѣте, даже вы куны съберуть, за мѣсяць"., romanized: I reche imŭ Volodimirŭ: "Pozhĭděte, dazhe vȳ kunȳ sŭberutĭ, za měsiatsĭ.) The diminutive words куница (kunitsa) in modern Russian and a куниця (kunytsya) in modern Ukrainian still mean "marten".

==== Kuna ====
Kuna is a weight and monetary unit, as well as the name of the coins used in Kievan Rus' and the Russian lands from the 10th to 15th centuries. The circulation of money in Rus' arose at the beginning of the 9th century due to the massive penetration into the Rus' lands of the eastern dirham weighing 2.73 g which gets the name "Kuna". Later, with the advent of Western European silver coins in money circulation, the European denarius became also known as kuna. As a result, money began to be called kuna in general.

As the currency of Kievan Rus', kuna was 1/25 grivna in the 10th–11th centuries, 1/50 grivna before the beginning of the 13th century. A “Kuna system” has taken shape: 1 kuna = 2 g of silver = 1/25 grivna = 2 rezanas = 6 vekshas.

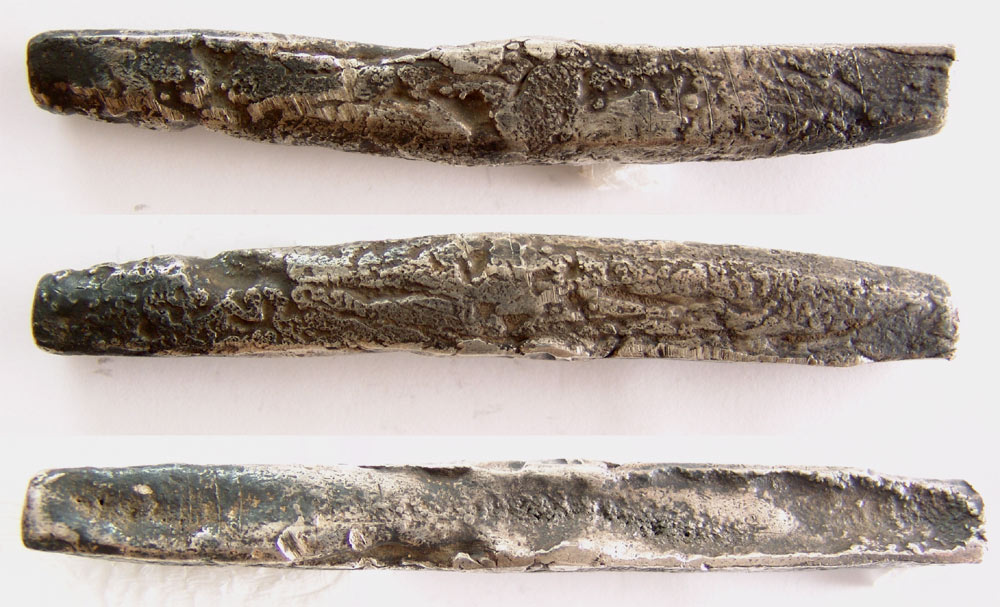
Grivna

==== Grivna ====
The grivna was the monetary and weight unit in Kievan Rus'. It was used, in particular, to measure the weight of silver and gold (from which its monetary equivalent appeared). The golden grivna was 12.5 times more expensive than the silver one. It is the first weight unit referred to in Rus' chronicles.

==== Veksha ====
Veksha (squirrel, veveritsa) is the smallest monetary unit in Rus' from the 9th to 12th centuries. It was first mentioned in The Tale of Bygone Years; also it was mentioned in the Russkaya Pravda. It was equal to 1/6 kuna. Silver veksha weighed about 1/3 grams.

In real money circulation, 2 vekshas were equal to Western European denarius. The translators of Byzantine authors identified veksha with the Byzantine copper coin “Nummi”. Proponents of the so-called fur theory of monetary circulation in Kievan Rus' consider the Veksha to be tanned squirrel skin, which was used simultaneously with its coin counterpart (part of the silver Arab dirham).

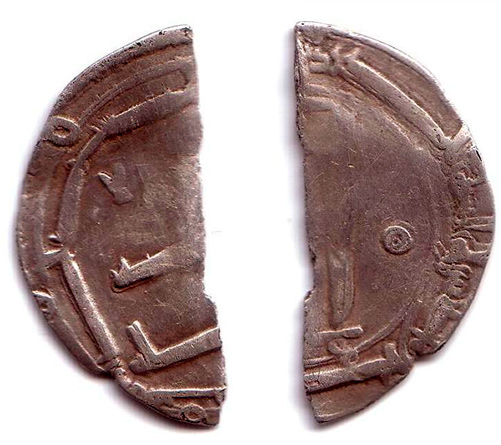
Rezana (Split Arabic silver dirham)

==== Rezana ====
Rezana was the monetary unit in Rus' and neighboring lands. Cuted half of the Arab dirham was called Rezana, that is, 1 cut was equal to about 1.38 grams of 900th sample silver.

The name Rezana (рѣзана) is derived from the verb REZAT'(рѣзати) and originated from Old East Slavic. When dirham received the name “Kuna”, the equivalent of a part of kuna was called “rezana”. Fragments of dirhams (1/2, 1/4, etc.) are often found in treasures. The fragmentation of dirhams indicates that the whole coin was too large for small trade transactions.

In the 9th century. Rezana was equal to 1/50 of the grivna, in the 12th century equated to kuna due to the fact that kuna became twice as light and was not 1/25, but 1/50 grivna. Kuna and rezana existed in parallel, but gradually the counting on the kuna became more common. Rezanas existed until the 12th century, when the flow of silver dirhams from Muslim countries finally dried up.

=== Rus' coins ===
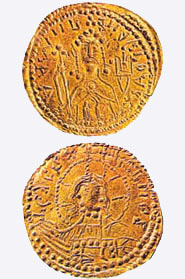
Zlatnik

==== Zolotnik ====
The zolotnik (also zlatnik, in both cases sounding like a Sultan - whose face might have been engraved) was the first gold coin, minted in Kiev in the late 10th and early 11th centuries, shortly after the Christianization of Kievan Rus' by Vladimir the Great.

The real name of these coins is unknown; the terms "zolotnik" and "zlatnik" are traditionally used in numismatics. It is mentioned in the text of the Rus'–Byzantine Treaty of the year 911 of the Prophetic Oleg. 1 zlatnik was 1/35 of kievan gold grivna. The mass of Zlatnik (about 4.2 g) was later used as the basis for the Russian weight unit, the zolotnik.

The appearance of coinage in Rus' was the result of the revival of trade and cultural ties with Byzantium. The obvious model for Vladimir's Zlatniks was the Byzantine Solidus of the emperors Basil II and Constantine VIII, which are similar to the Zlatniks by weight (about 4.2 grams) and the arrangement of images.

===== General information =====
It has been repeatedly suggested that the start of minting in Rus' of its own coin (gold and silver) did not so much meet the requirements of the economy (money circulation in Rus' was provided by imported Byzantine, Arab and Western European coins; there were no sources of monetary metal in Rus') but the significance of the Kievan Rus' state. Silver coinage continued at the beginning of the 11th century under the reign of Svyatopolk and Yaroslav, however, the coinage of Zlatniks after the death of Vladimir no longer resumed. Judging by the small number of copies that have come down to us, the release of Zlatniks was extremely short in time (perhaps one or two years) and small in volume. However, all currently known copies of Zlatniks found in treasures, along with other coins of that time, bear traces of being in circulation - therefore, these coins were not ritual, award or gift. In the 11th century, judging by the findings of these coins in the treasures in Pinsk and Kienburg, Zlatniks also participated in international money circulation.

===== Description of the coin type =====
Reverse: a chest portrait of Prince Vladimir in a hat with pendants topped with a cross. Bent legs are schematically shown below. With his right hand, the prince holds a cross, his left hand on his chest. Above the left shoulder is shown a characteristic trident, a generic sign of Rurikovich. Around in a circle Cyrillic inscription: ВЛАДИМИРѢ НА СТОЛѢ (Vladimir on the throne). On two coins from known 11, the inscription is different: ВЛАДИМИРѢ А СЕ ЕГО ЗЛАТО (Vladimir and his gold).

Obverse: the face of Christ with the Gospel in the left hand and with the blessing right hand. In a circle inscription: ІСУСѢ ХРИСТОСѢ.(Jesus Christ).

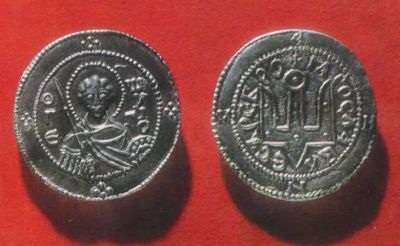
Srebrenik

==== Srebrenik ====
Srebrenik (also - Serebryanik) - the first silver coin minted in Kievan Rus' at the end of the 10th century, then - at the beginning of the 11th century with arbitrary weight from 1.73 to 4.68 g.

===== General information =====
The issue of the coin was not caused by real economic needs (the trade network of Kievan Rus' was served by Byzantine and Arab gold and silver coins) but by political goals: the coin served as an additional sign of the sovereignty of the Christian sovereign. Srebreniks were issued in small quantities and not for long, that's why they did not have a big impact on monetary circulation in Kievan Rus'.

Arabian silver coins were used for minting. Srebreniks were minted in Kiev by Vladimir Svyatoslavovich (978-1015), Svyatopolk (c. 1015) and Yaroslav the Wise in Novgorod (until 1015). A separate group is formed by coins of the Tmutarakan prince Oleg Svyatoslavich, minted in 1083–1094.

===== Description of the coin type =====
Compositions of pieces of silver are divided into several types. Srebreniks of the first issues basically repeated the type of Byzantine coins (the front side is the image of the prince, the back side is the image of Christ). In the 11th century, the image of Christ was replaced by a large patrimonial sign of Rurikovich. A legend was placed around the portrait of the prince: “Vladimir on the throne, and here is his silver”.

Srebrenik of Yaroslav the Wise differed from the described appearance. On one side, instead of Christ, there was an image of St. Georgy (Christian patron of Yaroslav), on the other - the patrimonial sign of Rurikovich and the inscription: “Yaroslavs silver” without the words “on the throne”, which gives reason to attribute their release to the period of Yaroslav's reign in Novgorod during the life of Vladimir Svyatoslavovich. Yaroslav's Srebrenik is a unique phenomenon in the coin production of Europe of the 11th century in relation to the masterful execution of a coin stamp, sometimes even causing suspicions that these are later fakes. A completely different type is represented by the Tmutarakan coins, on one side of which was an image of the Archangel Michael, and on the other side the inscription: “Lord, help Michael”. The technique of making Srebrenik has its own characteristics. Circles were not cut from the plate (as in the Byzantine and Arabic coins), but were molded.

== Coinless period from the 12th century (commodity-money) ==
=== Description of the period ===
The coinless period is a period in the history of the currency of Kievan Rus', characterized by an almost complete absence of both foreign and domestic coins. After the extinction of the inflow of eastern coins to Rus' due to the weakening of the Caliphate, they were replaced by commodity-money. This period began in the 12th century and ended in the 14th century. Commodity money were used as a medium of circulation. Large calculations were made with the help of cattle and silver ingots - grivnas; for small calculations was used fur, sometimes glass bracelets, beads, spindling, and other standard products of Kievan Rus' crafts. In some cases, even the cowry shells, which in Siberia retained their value as a small change coin until the beginning of the 19th century.

Starting with the establishment of the Tatar-Mongol yoke, the economy of the Rus' principalities is increasingly acquiring natural features. The main function of money became the function in the means of accumulation: coins were hoarding and deposit in treasures. This period was called coinless, covering the 12th, 13th and 14th centuries.

Own silver deposits were discovered in Russia only in the 18th century, therefore the country's monetary economy depended entirely on the influx of this metal, primarily in the form of a coin, from abroad. In the 12th century, this influx began to shorten from the western direction (presumably due to the strengthening of the German knight orders in the Baltic States and the beginning of regular hostilities between them and the western principalities; see the article “Ostsiedlung”), and in the 13th century from the eastern (presumably, this was caused by the Tatar-Mongol invasion).

The end of the coinless period is associated with the gradual restoration of trade relations (both internal and external), with the beginning of the spread of Juchi coins (silver dirhams and copper pools of the Golden Horde)

=== Ovruch slate spindle whorl ===
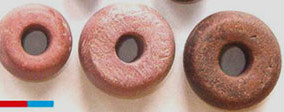
Ovruch slate spindle whorl

A particularly valuable commodity, produced in the Volhynian city of Ovruch in the 10th–13th centuries, was the reddish-coloured slate spindle whorl, carved out of pink and red slate stone (pyrophyllite slate), which was mined near the town of Ovruch in the territory of present-day Ukraine. Ovruch masters diligently repeated the most successful form of a clay spindle whorl - biconical (the weight as if consisted of two truncated cones connected by broad bases) The spindle whorl weighed on average about 16 g, the height was from 4 to 12 mm, the outer diameter was from 10 to 25 mm, the diameter of the hole for the spindle was 6–10 mm. If the spindle whorl turned out to be too narrow, it was wrapped with a thread so that it would not slip during rotation. Slate - soft stone; on the samples found by archaeologists, there are still scuffs from the threads. The production of slate spindles in Ovruch was designed for wide sales. The merchants who bought the consignment of the spindle whorls made a considerable way with them, sold them in different lands. Ovruch spindle whorls are found by archaeologists not only in the territories of Kievan Rus', but in other regions. Production of spindle whorls was designed for a wide sale. Ovruch's production and widespread sale of spindle whorls contributed significantly to the Galician–Volhynian economy. According to A. V. Artsikhovsky, "they are exactly the same in Kiev and Vladimir, in Novgorod and Ryazan, even in Cherson, in the Crimea and in the Bulgaria on the Volga." The Ovruch spindle whorls were so valued that the owners carved their personal tags on them, and after the spread of writing - carved their names. In the mid-13th century, the stone spindle whorls become clay again: the workshops of Ovruch were destroyed during the Mongol invasion of Kievan Rus'.

=== Role of spindle whorls in the coinless period ===
During the coinless period, various silver grivnas existed in Kievan Rus', but the main types were Kiev ingots of the 11th to 13th centuries in the shape of an elongated hexagon weighing 135–169 g and Novgorod - longitudinal bars with a stable average weight of 197 g, preserved in circulation until the 15th century. For this period coins disappeared in Rus'. For large payments grivnas were used.

The original theory of commodity-money was proposed by V. L. Yanin. The scientist stated that the role of money for small payments could be fulfilled by some uniform and widespread products in Kievan Rus' - such as crystal and cornelian beads, often marked in hoards with coins, multi-colored glass bracelets, and ovruch slate spindle whorls. These spindle whorls were repeatedly met in hoards along with ingots, and during excavations in Pskov, for example, they were found in a wallet with Western European coins. When V. L. Yanin combined the distribution maps of glass bracelets and slate spindles whorls, and also plotted the boundaries of the monetary circulation area before the Mongol invasion, their detailed coincidence was discovered. Slate spindle whorl could well play the role of a coin. It was impossible to fake it, because the pink slate deposit in Ovruch was the only one in Eastern Europe. In China, according to one of the versions, the spindle became the prototype of the first coins with a square hole.

=== Cowry coin ===
And one more find attracted the attention of scientists: Cypraea's shell - the cowry coin. These beautiful porcelain shells were mined only around the Maldives and Laccadives in the Indian Ocean. From ancient times they were exported to India, from where they spread throughout the world. Shells have been used for thousands of years in Africa and Asia as small money. In Russia, cowry has been known under the name of "snake heads". In Russian trade in Siberia, they retained their product value until the 19th century.

== Legacy ==
In the mid-14th century – about 100 years after the end of Kievan Rus' in 1240 – in the Novgorod Republic and the Principality of Moscow, the Kievan grivna was gradually replaced by the ruble as the highest token of exchange.

== Bibliography ==
- Cross, Samuel Hazzard; Sherbowitz-Wetzor, Olgerd P. (1953) [1930]. The Russian Primary Chronicle, Laurentian Text. Translated and edited by Samuel Hazzard Cross and Olgerd P. Sherbowitz-Wetzor (PDF). Cambridge, Massachusetts: The Mediaeval Academy of America. p. 325. (particularly page 234, footnotes 25 and 26).
- Ostrowski, Donald; Birnbaum, David J. (7 December 2014). "Rus' primary chronicle critical edition – Interlinear line-level collation". pvl.obdurodon.org (in Church Slavic). Archived from the original on 28 April 2025. – A 2014 digitised and improved online version of Ostrowski et al. 2003.
- Martin, Janet (2007). Medieval Russia: 980–1584. Second Edition. E-book. Cambridge: Cambridge University Press. ISBN 978-0-511-36800-4.
- Omeljan Pritsak, The Origins of the Old Rus' Weights & Monetary Systems: Two Studies in Western Eurasian Metrology & Numismatics in Seventh to Eleventh (1998). 184 pages. ISBN 9780916458485.
- Thuis, Hans (2015). Nestorkroniek. De oudste geschiedenis van het Kievse Rijk [Nestor Chronicle: the oldest history of the Kievan Realm] (in Dutch). Nijmegen: Uitgeverij Vantilt. p. 304. ISBN 9789460042287.
