= Kremlin (disambiguation) =

Kremlin may refer to:

- Kremlin (fortification), a major fortified central complex found in historic Russian cities

== Russia ==
- The Kremlin or the Moscow Kremlin, originally a fortress, now seat of the Russian (formerly Soviet) government
  - Metonym for the Government of Russia
  - Metonym for the Government of the Soviet Union
- Kazan Kremlin, a fortress and UNESCO world heritage site in Kazan
- Novgorod Kremlin, a fortress and UNESCO world heritage site in Novgorod
- Smolensk Kremlin, a fortress in Smolensk
- Tula Kremlin, a fortress in Tula

== Places ==
- Le Kremlin-Bicêtre, a suburb and metro stop in Paris, France
- Kremlin, Montana, a town in Montana, United States
- Kremlin, Oklahoma, a town in Oklahoma, United States
- Kremlin, Virginia, a town in Westmoreland County, Virginia, United States
- Kremlin, Wisconsin, an unincorporated community in Marinette County, Wisconsin, United States
- Kremlin, a nightclub in Belfast, Northern Ireland, UK
- Quarry House, a building in Quarry Hill, Leeds, England, UK; nicknamed "The Kremlin"

== Other uses ==
- Kremlin (board game), a 1988 board game by Avalon Hill
- Kremlin Cup, a professional tennis tournament in Moscow, Russia
- Kremlin, a character in No. 1 Ladies Detective Agency
- "Kremlin", a song by We Stood Like Kings from the album USSR 1926 (2015), a new soundtrack for the Soviet silent movie A Sixth Part of the World.
- The Moscow Kremlin (Fabergé egg), imperial jewellery

== See also ==
- The Cardinal of the Kremlin, 1988 novel by Tom Clancy
- Kremlings, crocodilian characters in the Donkey Kong video game series.
- Kremlinology
