= Kolomna Kremlin =

Historic fort in Kolomna, Moscow Oblast, Russia

Coordinates: 55°06′14″N 38°45′10″E

Kolomna Kremlin (Russian: Коломенский Кремль) is a fortress in Kolomna, Russia. The stone Kolomna Kremlin was built from 1525–1531 under the Russian Tsar Vasily III. Before its reconstruction in 1531, the Kolomna Kremlin was made of wood. On its territory there are many Russian churches and monasteries: The Uspensky cathedral, the Voskresenky church, the Spassky monastery (14th century), and a number of others.

== Architectural features ==
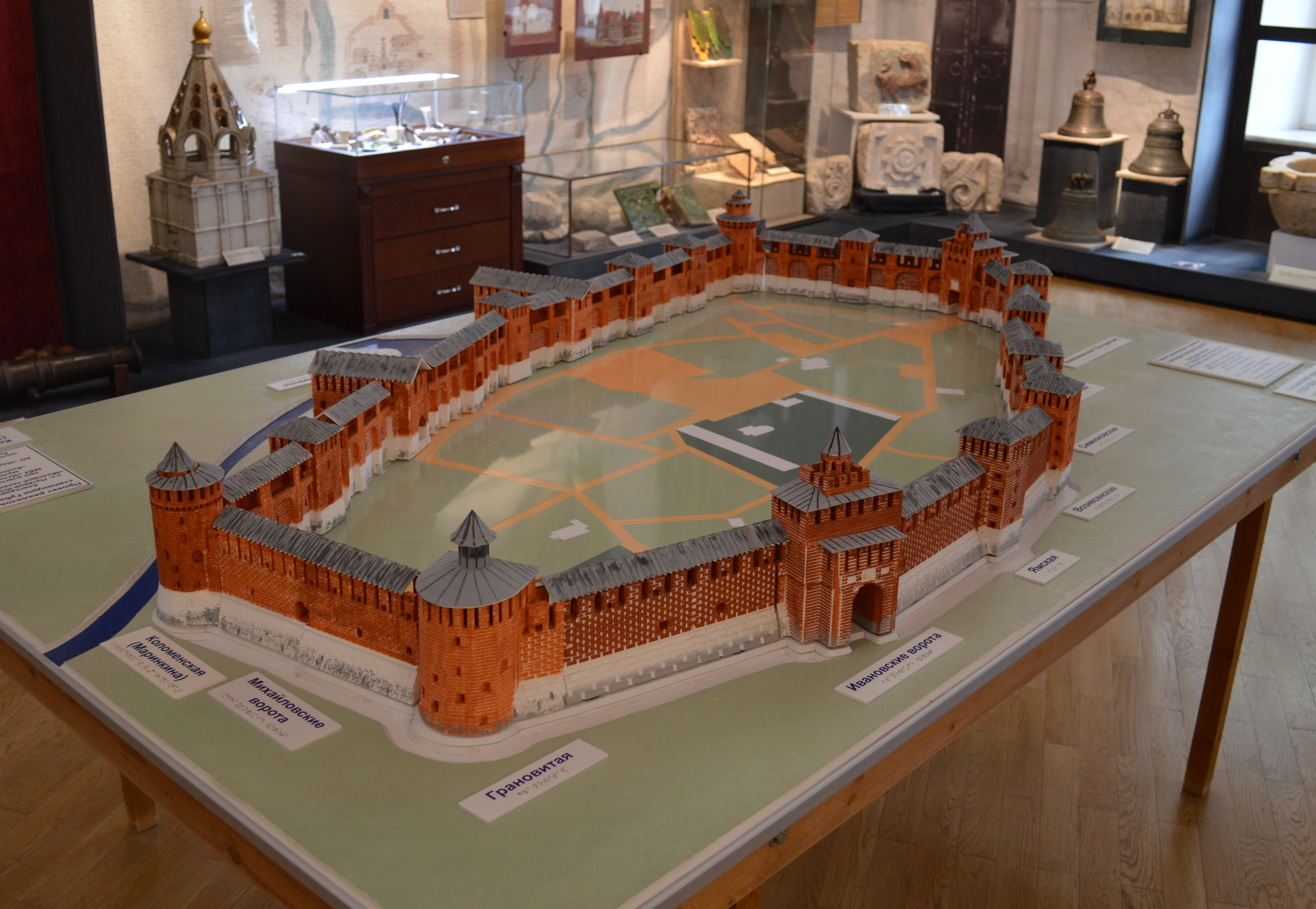
Kolomna Kremlin model

There is a version that construction of the Kolomna Kremlin was headed by Italian architect Aleviz Friazin, who participated in the construction of walls and towers of the Moscow Kremlin and took it as an example for the construction of the Kolomna Kremlin. This is indicated, for example, by the construction period of the Kolomna Kremlin. The Kremlin was built in six years, which indicates that builders of the fortress had a great experience because comparable in scale construction in the capital lasted more than ten years.

The Kolomna Kremlin, as well as fortresses of other Russian towns of that period (Veliky Novgorod, Ivangorod, Nizhny Novgorod, Zaraisk and Tula), contain features of Italian origin. Fortification forms of northern Italian fortresses, such as those in Turin, Milan, and Verona, were repeated. Besides general construction methods and Italian architectural details, such as machicolations - loopholes in towers, combat parapet with dovetail-shaped merlons, faceted towers of the main fence, and diversionary towers. There are further similarities between the Moscow and Kolomna Kremlins.

The walls of Kolomna Kremlin, despite a certain archaism of fortress architecture of that time, were created not only to resist assaults by manpower but to defend with cannon. The towers and walls of the fortress were full of embrasures. The embrasures themselves are designed for the placement of firearms, have a characteristic shape of embrasures - a socket, and at times, they are overlapped by vaults. The embrasures of the towers give a good view of the adjoining parts of the walls and the castle moat.

== Buildings of the Kolomna Kremlin ==
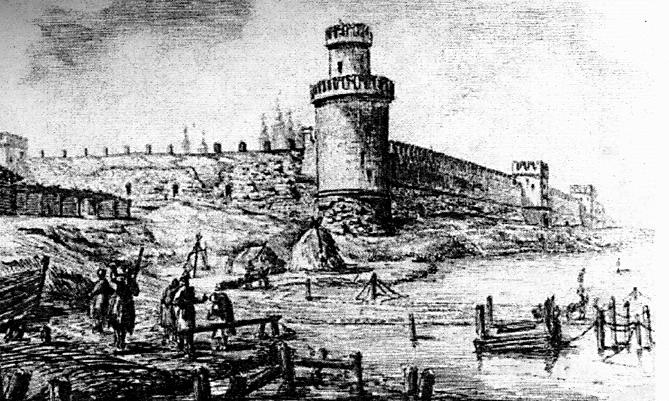
Sviblova Tower and a view of the Kolomna Kremnlin. Picture by M. Kazakov (1778).

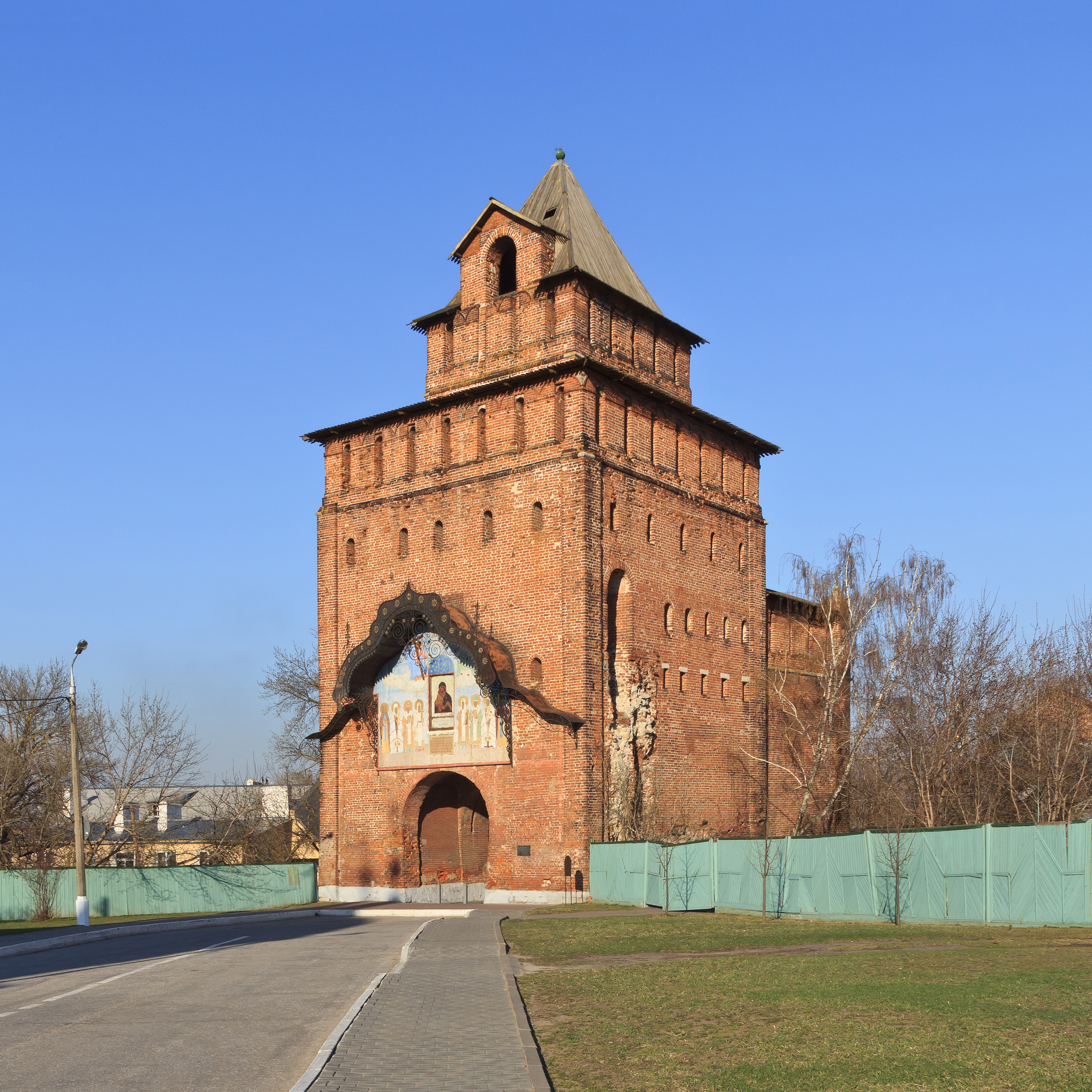
Pyatnitskie Gates

Kolomna Kremlin on a definitive stamp of Russia.

The Kolomna kremlin once had 17 towers, four of which had gates, with the main gates being located at the northern and southern end of the complex. Only 7 towers and two parts of the wall have survived.

Here is a list of the towers (towers marked as gates means that a gate was running underneath it):

- Pyatnitskie Gates
- Kolomenskaya Tower
- Granovitaya Tower
- Yamskaya Tower
- Simionovskaya Tower
- Spasskaya Tower
- Pogorelaya Tower
- Voznesenskaya Tower
- Ivanovskie Gates
- Borisobglebskaya Tower
- Kosie Gates
- Voskresenskaya Tower
- Sandirevskaya Tower
- Bobretsevskaya Tower
- Vodynie Gates
- Sviblova Tower
- Zastenochnaya Tower

Besides towers, there were two gates in walls: The Mihaelovskie Gates and the Melynychnie Gates

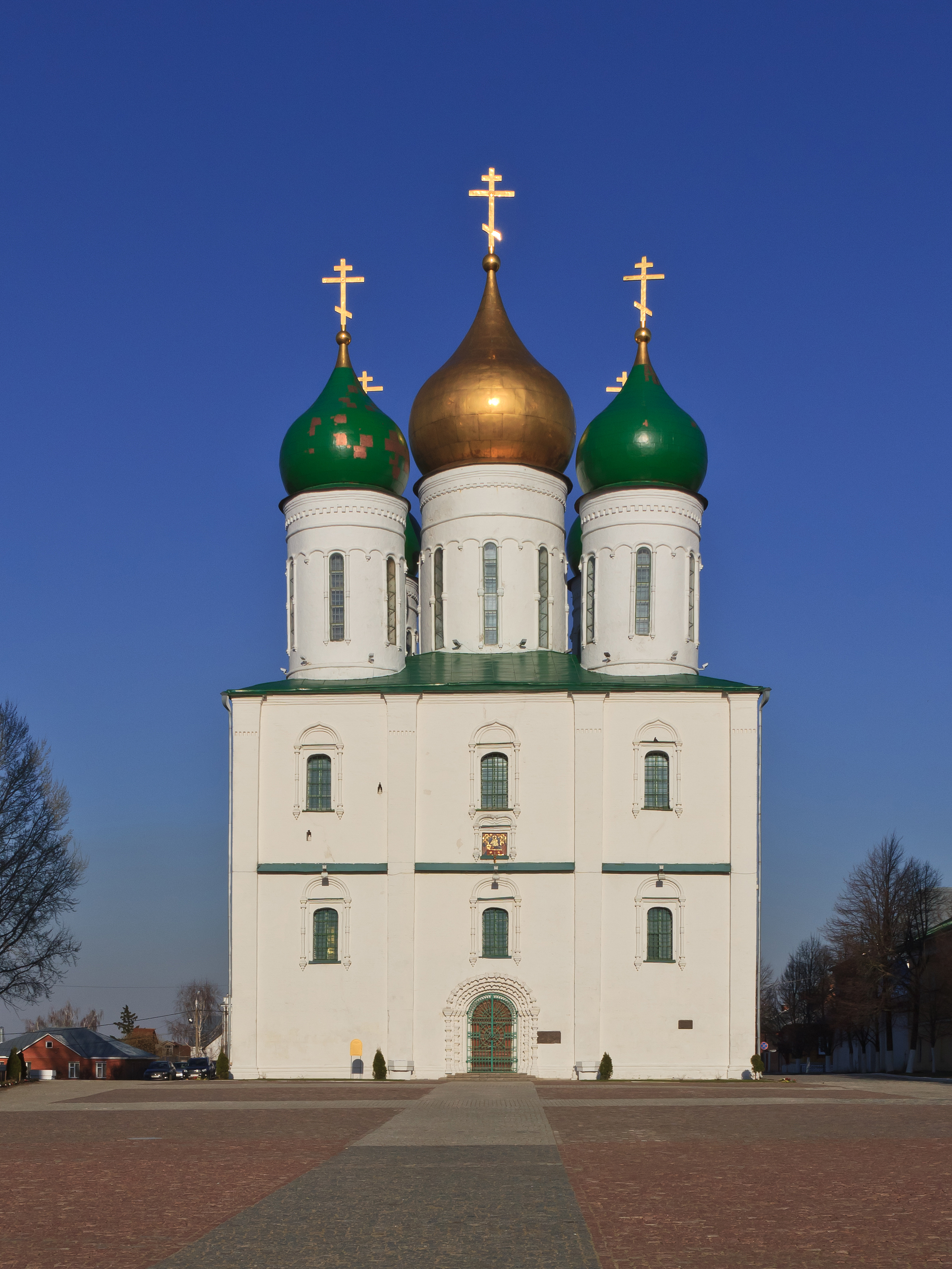
The Cathedral of the Ascension in the Kolomna Kremlin

== Statistics ==
Number of towers:	17
Number of towers in the keep:	7
Number of gates:	3
Years of construction:	1525–1531
Area:	24 hectares
Length of wall:	1940 meters
Height of towers:	30–35 meters
Height of wall:	18–21 meters
Thickness of wall:	3-4.5 meters
