= Bishop Street, Novgorod Detinets =

Street in Veliky Novgorod, Russia

Bishop Street
- Piskuplya
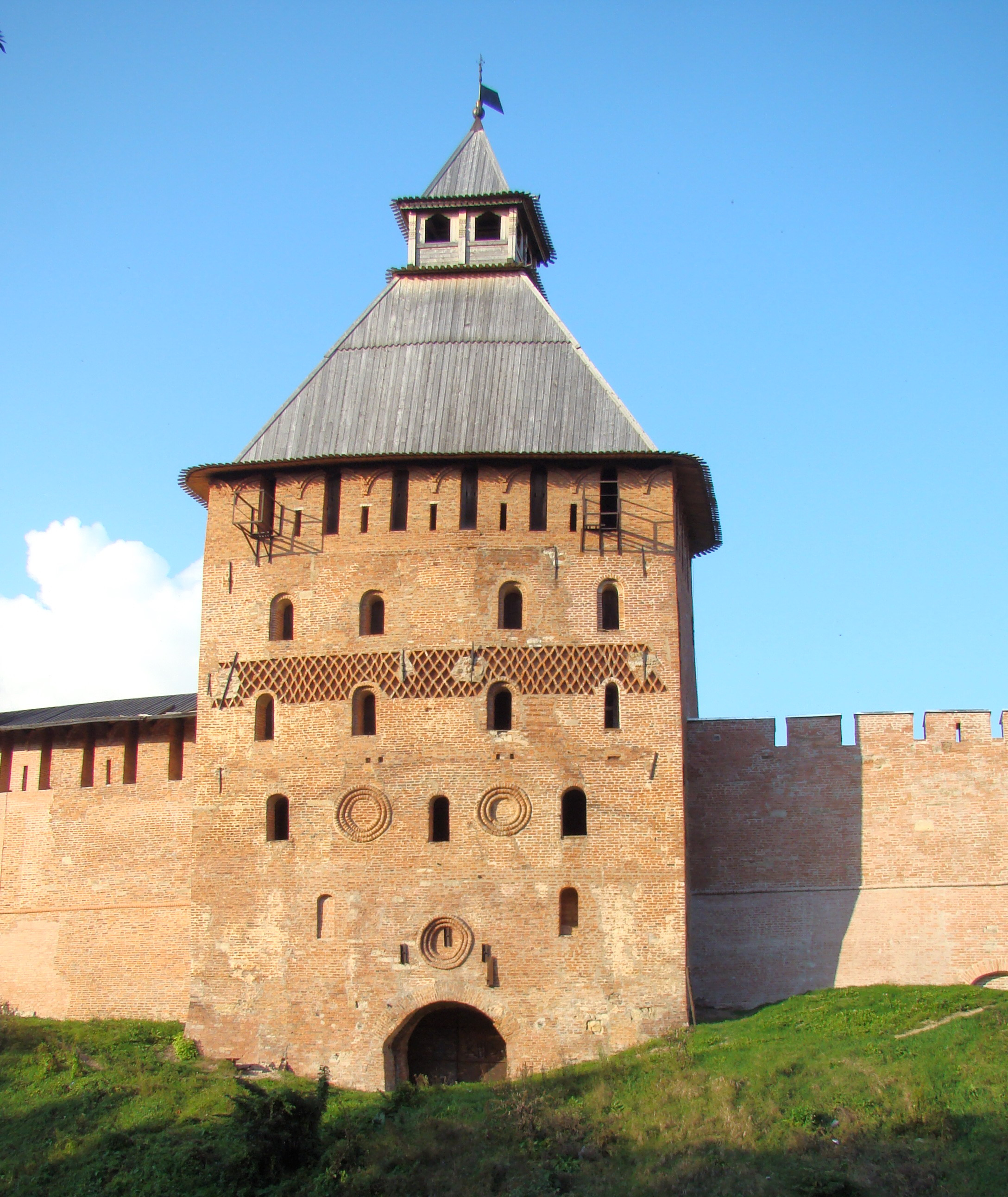
- Saviour's gatehouse
- Interactive map of Bishop Street
- Native name: Епископская улица (Russian); Пискупля (Russian)
- Location: Novgorod Detinets

Construction
- Inauguration: before 1049
- Demolished: before 18th century

Bishop Street (Russian: Епископская улица, also known as Piskuplya, Russian: Пискупля – ancient form of "bishop's") was the main street of the Novgorod Detinets in the Middle Ages. The street was buried by the 18th century, its precise location is a subject of considerable historical and archeological research.

The earliest attempts to locate the street date to early 19th century, when Eugene Bolkhovitinov placed the early wooden Cathedral of St. Sophia (ca. 989) on Piskuplya, high up on the bank of Volkhov river, behind the old government offices built in the 18th century. I. Krasov in 1851 (S. Troyanovski dates the publication 1853) suggested that the street rаn past the church of Andrew Stratelates, but the locations of the ends of it were unclear.

In 1938 A. A. Strokov and V. A. Bogusevich directed archaeological excavations near the Savior's gatehouse (Russian: Спасская башня, built in end of the 15th century), when a section of a wood-paved street was unearthed at a depth of 1.9 m. Since these archeologists expected one end of Piskuplya to be located next to Saviour gate, they had identified the pavement with this street and dated its lowest level as 10th century construction, out of total 15 levels. Troyanovsky argues that the interpretation by Strokov and Bogusevich is dubious, as the 15th century level is located just 1.75 m above the purported 10th century one, thus the buildup of the occupation layer was supposed to be an improbably low 0.35 m per century. An attempt to find continuation of Piskuplya near the Church of Andrew Stratelates in 1940 failed.

Тhe chronicles date the street back to at least 1049, as they mention that the wooden Cathedral of St. Sophia was located on this street. The wooden building burned down and was replaced by the current stone one by 1049. The chronicle record, however, is contradictory, as it mentions that the wooden construction was replaced by the Boris and Gleb Church; archeological and historical data clearly place the latter away from the Bishop Street. Valentin Yanin in 1977 identified this placement as an error made by a 15th-century scribe.

Yanin in 1982 suggested that Piskuplya ran between Fedorovskaya and South towers of the Detinets, and the wooden Sophia cathedral was located at its southern end.

== Sources ==
- Алешковский, М. Х. (1962). "Новгородский детинец 1044–1430-х гг. (по результатам новых исследований)". Архитектурное наследство (in Russian). 14. Moscow: 3–26.
- Karger, Mikhail Konstantinovich (1973). Novgorod the Great: Architectural Guidebook. Progress Publishers. p. 63. OCLC 1008351692.
- Dejevsky, Nikolai J. (2007). Novgorod in the Early Middle Ages: The Rise and Growth of an Urban Community. Archaeopress. pp. 48–49. ISBN 978-1-4073-0065-8. OCLC 1085752832.
- Янин, Валентин Лаврентьевич; Алешковский, М. Х. (1971). "Происхождение Новгорода (к постановке проблемы)". История СССР (in Russian). 2: 32–61.
- Носов, Е. Н. (1995). "Новгородский детинец и Городище (к вопросу о ранних укреплениях и становлении города)" (PDF). Новгородский исторический сборник (in Russian). 5 (15). СПб: 5–17.
- Т. Гладенко; Л. Красноречьев; Г. Штендер; Л. Шуляк (1964). "Архитектура Новгорода в свете последних исследований". In Тихомиров, Михаил (ed.). Новгород. К 1100-летию города (in Russian). Moscow: Наука. pp. 183–263.
- Трояновский, С. В. (1995). "История изучения Новгородского кремля" (PDF). Новгородский исторический сборник (in Russian). 5 (15). СПб.
- Колчин, Б. А.; Янин, В. Л., eds. (1982). "Археологии Новгорода 50 лет". Новгородский сборник: 50 лет раскопок Новгорода (in Russian). pp. 3–137.
