= Kremlin (fortification) =

Major fortified central complex found in historic Russian cities

A kremlin (/ˈkrɛmlɪn/ KREM-lin; Russian: кремль, romanized: kreml’, IPA: [ˈkrʲemlʲ]) is a major fortified central complex found in historic Russian cities. The word is often used to refer to the Moscow Kremlin, and metonymically to the government based there. Other such fortresses are called detinets, such as the Novgorod Detinets.

== Etymology ==
The Russian word is of uncertain origin. Different versions include the word originating from the Turkic languages, the Greek language or from Baltic languages. The word may share the same root as kremen' (Russian: кремень, romanized: kremenj, IPA: [krʲɪˈmʲenʲ]), meaning 'flint'.

== History ==
The term kremlin (also kremnik) is first encountered in chronicles of 1317 in accounts of the construction of the Tver Kremlin, where a wooden city-fortress was erected, which was clayed and whitewashed. The term detinets (such as in the Novgorod Detinets) is considered to be older and was kept in the Novgorod region, while the term krom (such as in the Pskov Krom) was more often used in the Pskov region. In other Russian regions, such as in the Moscow and Tver regions, fortresses in the center of cities began to use the term kremlin instead, which superseded the term detinets in the 14th and 15th centuries.

Wooden fortresses were erected everywhere in the Russian state—from the far eastern lands to the Swedish border. They were numerous in the south, where they served as a link of fortified fortification zones cutting off the way to the central regions from Crimean Tatars. Wooden fortresses were built quickly: in 1638 in Mtsensk fortress walls of Bolshoi Ostrog and Pletny Gorod with a total length of about 3 kilometres with 13 towers and almost one hundred meters long bridge over the River Zusha were erected in 20 days. The town of Sviyazhsk was built similarly during the Kazan campaign in the spring of 1551: fortress walls about 2.5 kilometres long, many churches and houses were erected in a month.

Many Kremlins were later rebuilt and strengthened, such as the Moscow Kremlin under Ivan III which was reconstructed using brick.

In the 16th and 17th centuries, about 30 stone fortresses were built in the Russian state. New kremlins have regular geometric forms in plan (Zaraisky and Tula Kremlins). The Tula Kremlin is unique because it was built in a valley (which was possible because of undeveloped siege artillery of nomad Tatars).

Construction of the Kremlin lasted until the turn of the 17th and 18th centuries. The last kremlin structure – the Tobolsk Kremlin – was built using stone between 1699 and 1717 in the town of Tobolsk (the easternmost kremlin in Russia).

== List of kremlins ==
=== World Heritage Sites ===
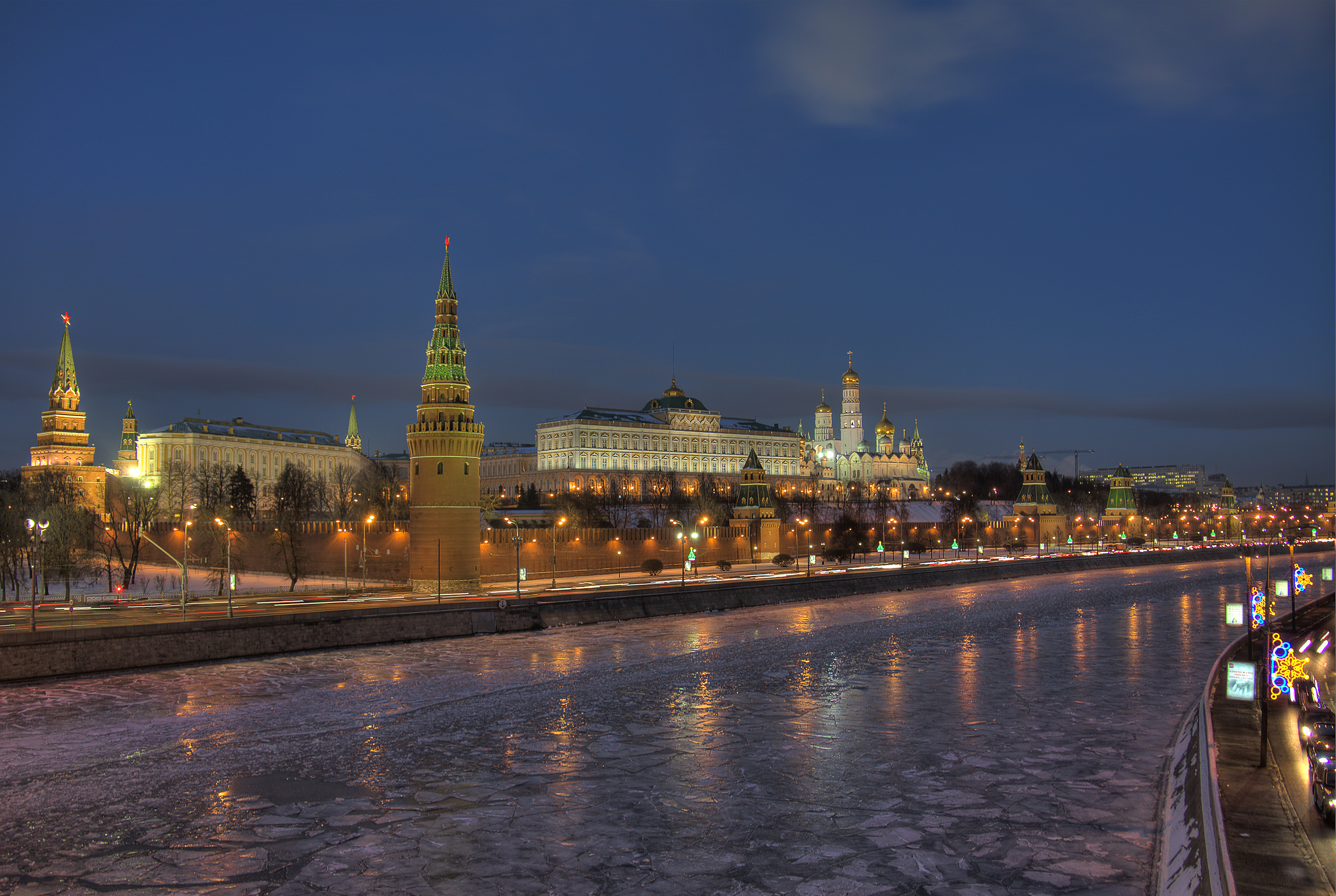
The Moscow Kremlin, better known simply as the Kremlin, the most famous of the kremlins

- Moscow Kremlin (better known simply as the Kremlin)
- Novgorod Detinets
- Solovetsky Monastery
- Suzdal Kremlin
- Kazan Kremlin

=== Intact ===
- Astrakhan Kremlin
- Kolomna Kremlin
- Nizhny Novgorod Kremlin
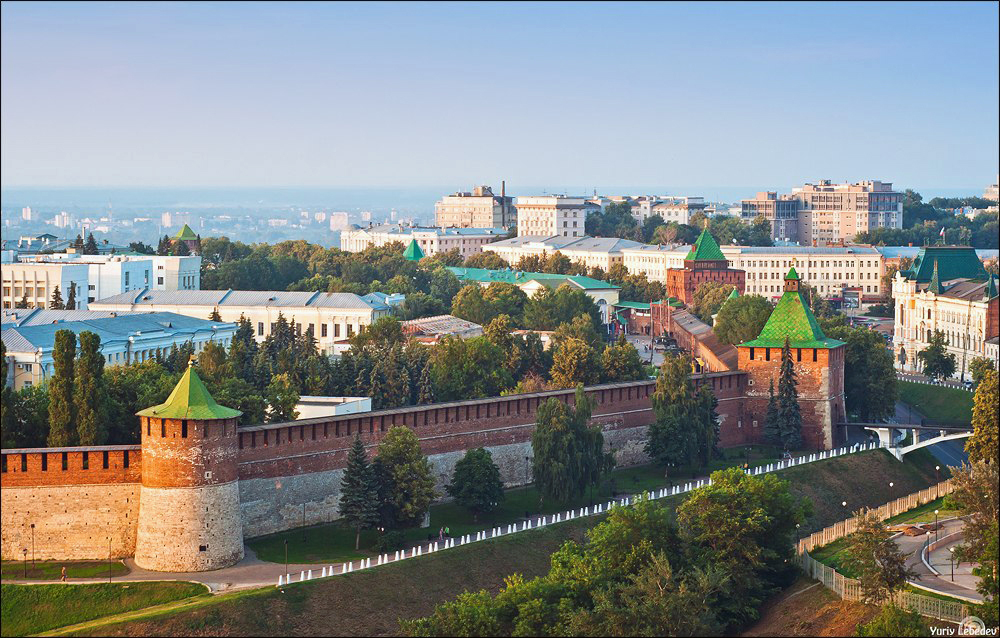
  Nizhny Novgorod Kremlin
- Pskov Kremlin
- Rostov Kremlin (a bishop's residence, not formally considered a kremlin)

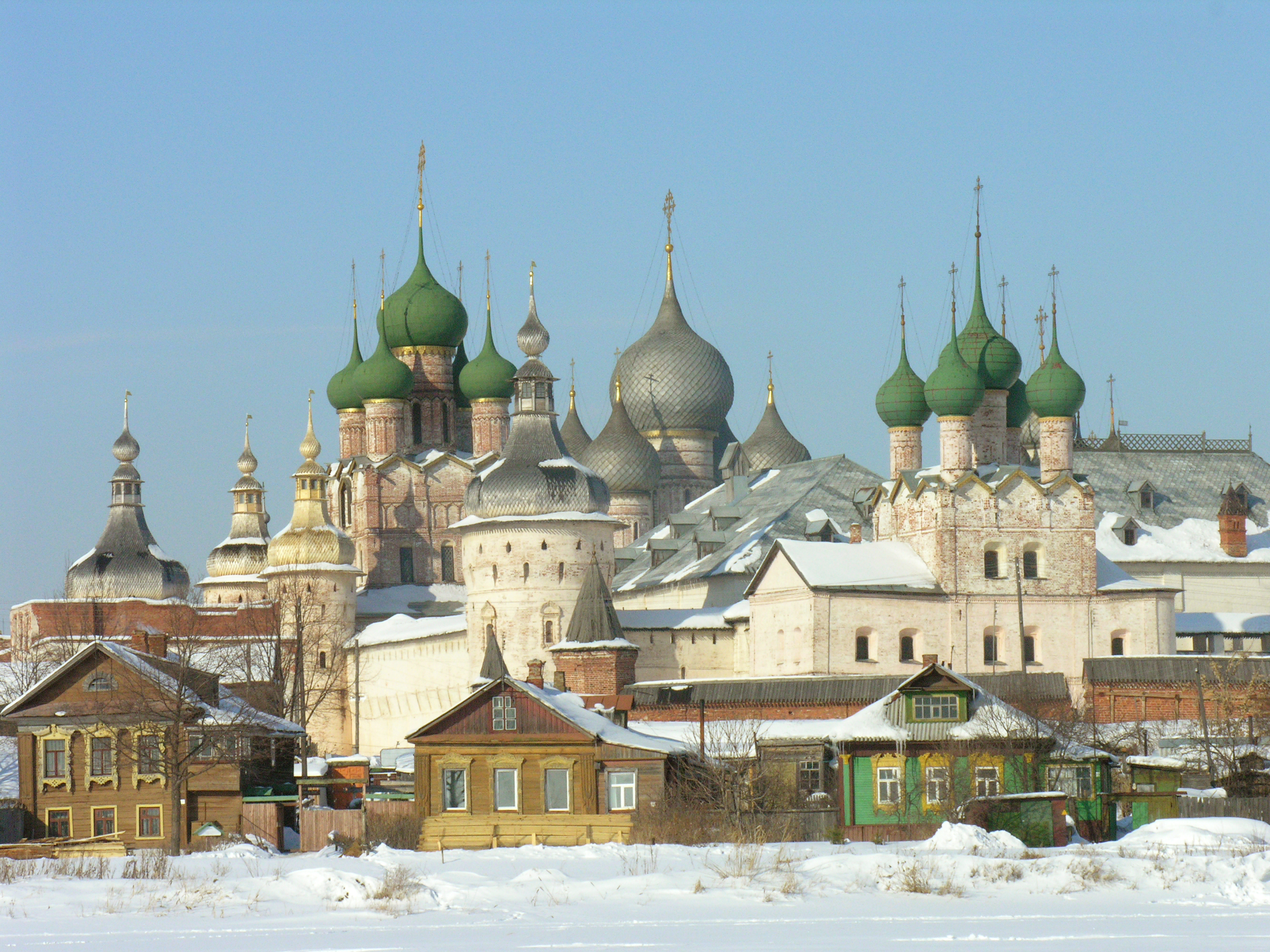
The bishop's residence in Rostov, sometimes called a kremlin

- Smolensk Kremlin
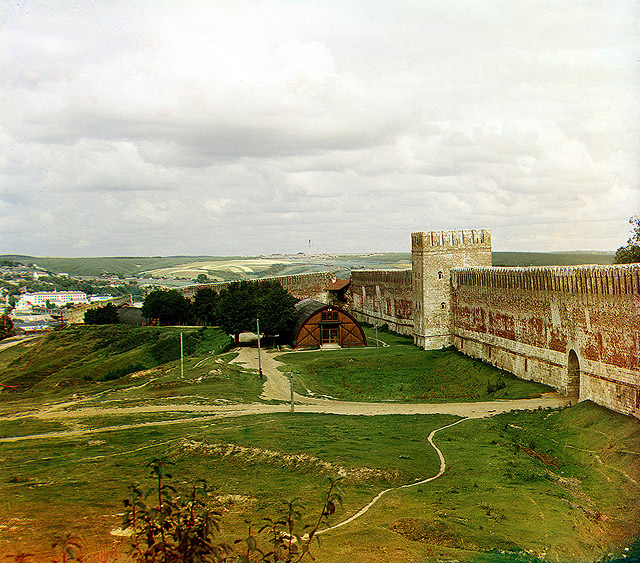
  A wall of Smolensk Kremlin in 1912
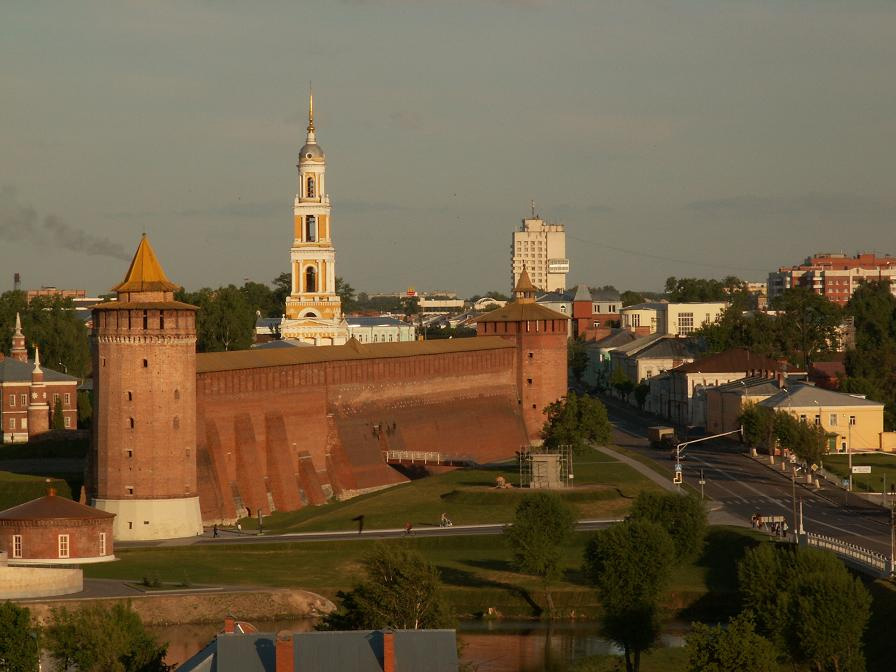
  Remains of the Kolomna Kremlin
- Tobolsk Kremlin (the sole stone kremlin in Siberia)
- Tula Kremlin
- Zaraysk Kremlin
- Ivangorod Fortress (not formally considered a kremlin)
- Oreshek Fortress (not formally considered a kremlin)
- Staraya Ladoga
- Alexandrov Kremlin (a czar residence, not formally considered a kremlin)
- Korela Fortress (not formally considered a kremlin)
- Izborsk Kremlin

=== In ruins ===
- Gdov Kremlin
- Porkhov Kremlin
- Serpukhov Kremlin
- Velikie Luki Kremlin
- Torzhok Kremlin
- Mozhaysk Kremlin
- Fortress of Koporye (not formally considered a kremlin)
- Vyazma Kremlin (one tower)
- Syzran Kremlin (one tower, 1683)
- Ufa

=== Existing and unwalled ===
- Vladimir Kremlin (Tower Golden Gate and bank)
- Dmitrov
- Ryazan
- Vologda (a bishop residence, not formally considered a kremlin)
- Yaroslavl (two towers)
- Pereslavl-Zalessky
- Khlynov (Vyatka)
- Volokolamsk

=== Traces remain ===
- Borovsk
- Opochka
- Zvenigorod
- Starodub
- Tver – a wooden fortress was burned down in a fire in 1763
- Sknyatino – underwater since flooding during the 1930s.
- Yam fortress (not formally considered a kremlin)
- Fortress of Radonezh
- Ryazan
- Old Ryazan (60 km from modern Ryazan)
- Ostrov (14th-15th centuries)
- Belgorod (bank of fortress)
- Vereya
- Kaluga
- Kleshchin
- Kostroma
- Pustozyorsk
- Uglich
- Staritsa
- Sviyazhsk
- Cheboksary
- Yuryev-Polsky
- Aleksin
- Opochka
- Oryol
- Rurikovo Gorodische
- Mtsensk
- Raskiel

=== Modern imitations ===
- Izmaylovo Kremlin
- Yoshkar Ola

== See also ==
- Citadel

== Sources ==
- Galeotti, Mark (2 March 2022). The Moscow Kremlin: Russia’s Fortified Heart. Bloomsbury Publishing. ISBN 978-1-4728-4547-4.
- Nossov, Konstantin S. (2012a). Medieval Russian Fortresses AD 862–1480. Bloomsbury Publishing. ISBN 978-1-84908-060-6.
- Nossov, Konstantin S. (2012b). Russian Fortresses 1480–1682. Bloomsbury Publishing. ISBN 978-1-84908-038-5.
