= Detinets =

Historic Russian citadel

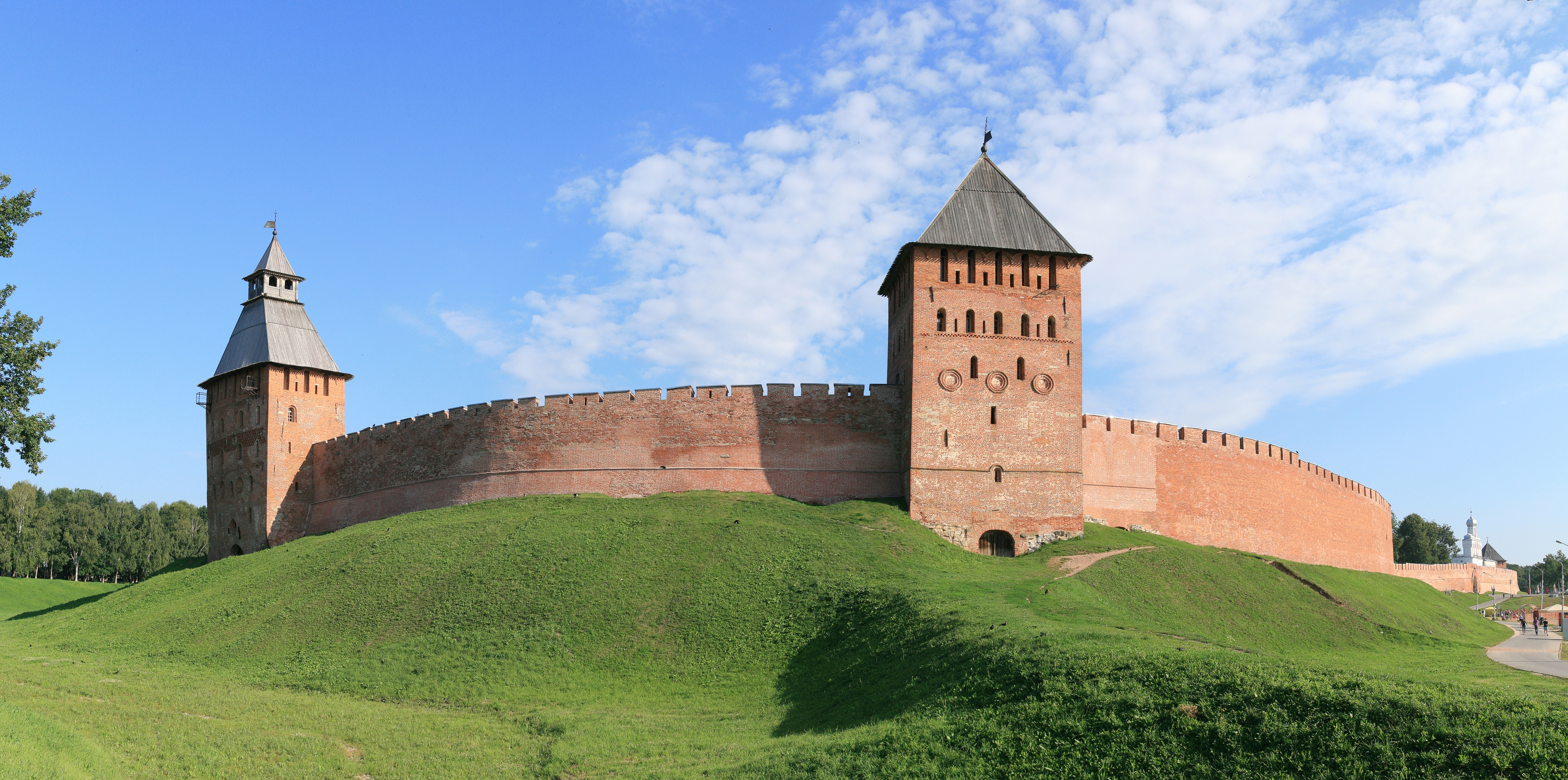
Novgorod Detinets in Veliky Novgorod, Russia

A detinets (Russian: детинец [dʲɪˈtʲinʲɪts]) or detinetz (/ˈdɛtɪnɛts/ DET-in-ets) is a type of citadel found in historic Russian cities, similar to a kremlin.

== Etymology ==
The origin of the term is uncertain. Some believe it is derived from the Russian word deti, meaning "children", suggesting it was used to hide children and other less able people during a siege.

== History ==
The term detinets (like the Novgorod Detinets) is considered to be older and was kept in the Novgorod region, while the term krom (like the Pskov Krom) was more often used in the Pskov region. In other Russian regions, such as in the Moscow and Tver regions, fortresses in the center of cities began to use the term kremlin, which superseded the term detinets in the 14th and 15th centuries.

== Sources ==
- Brumfield, William Craft (2 December 2013). Landmarks of Russian Architecture. Routledge. ISBN 978-1-317-97325-6.
- Cracraft, James (26 October 1988). The Petrine Revolution in Russian Architecture. University of Chicago Press. p. 65. ISBN 978-0-226-11664-8.
- Galeotti, Mark (2 March 2022). The Moscow Kremlin: Russia’s Fortified Heart. Bloomsbury Publishing. ISBN 978-1-4728-4547-4.
- Nossov, Konstantin S. (2012a). Medieval Russian Fortresses AD 862–1480. Bloomsbury Publishing. ISBN 978-1-84908-060-6.
- Nossov, Konstantin S. (2012b). Russian Fortresses 1480–1682. Bloomsbury Publishing. ISBN 978-1-84908-038-5.
