= Tobolsk Kremlin =

Historic fortress in Tobolsk, Russia

Coordinates: 58°11′57″N 68°15′11″E

The Tobolsk Kremlin (Russian: Тобольский кремль) is the sole stone kremlin in Siberia. It is located in Tobolsk, Tyumen Oblast, Russia.

== History ==
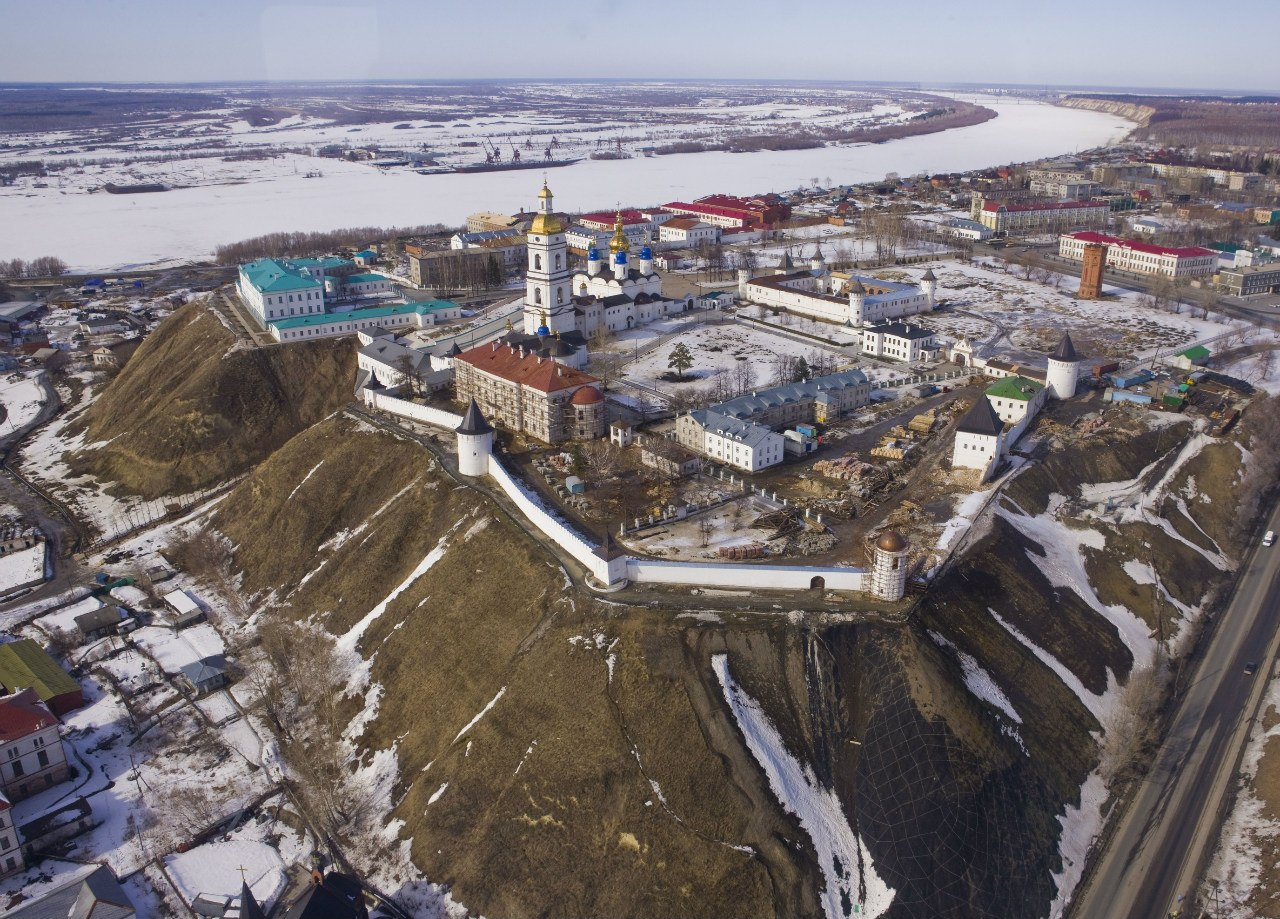
Aerial view of the Tobolsk Kremlin, taken by Russian President Dmitry Medvedev.

Tobolsk was founded in 1587. Moscow encouraged the construction of stone buildings there. In 1683-1686, masons sent from Moscow and Veliky Ustyug built the stone St. Sophia-Assumption Cathedral. Around the beginning of the 18th century the stone walls and the towers of the Kremlin were built, as well as a number of buildings that have not survived to our days, standing on a westward line from St. Sophia-Assumption Cathedral: the Holy Trinity Cathedral, the Bishop's House, the Holy Gate with the Church of St. Sergius of Radonezh and the bell tower. The Siberian Metropolitan Paul (who, before the appointment to Tobolsk, was the Archimandrite of the Chudov Monastery in the Moscow Kremlin) supervised the construction. The cathedrals built under his supervision were cross-domed structures topped by five domes.

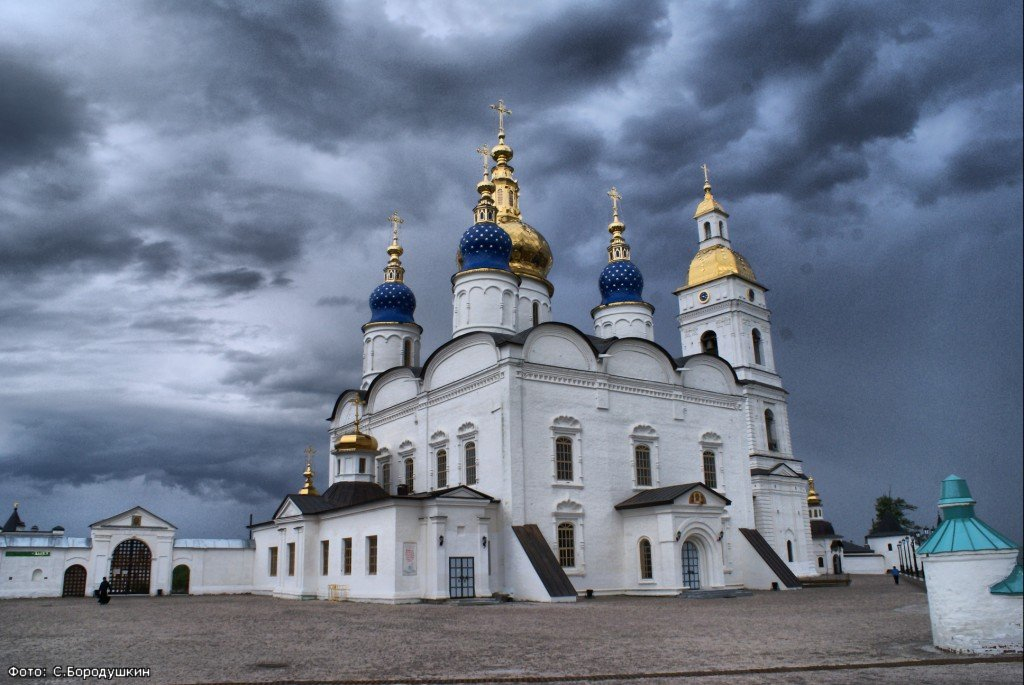
St. Sophia-Assumption Cathedral

At the end of the 17th century construction work in the Kremlin was continued by Semyon Remezov, a cartographer who was also the first historian of Siberia. He had the Departmental Palace (1699–1704) built above the southern cliff of the hill and the Trading Arcades (1702–1706) in the northwestern corner of the Kremlin.

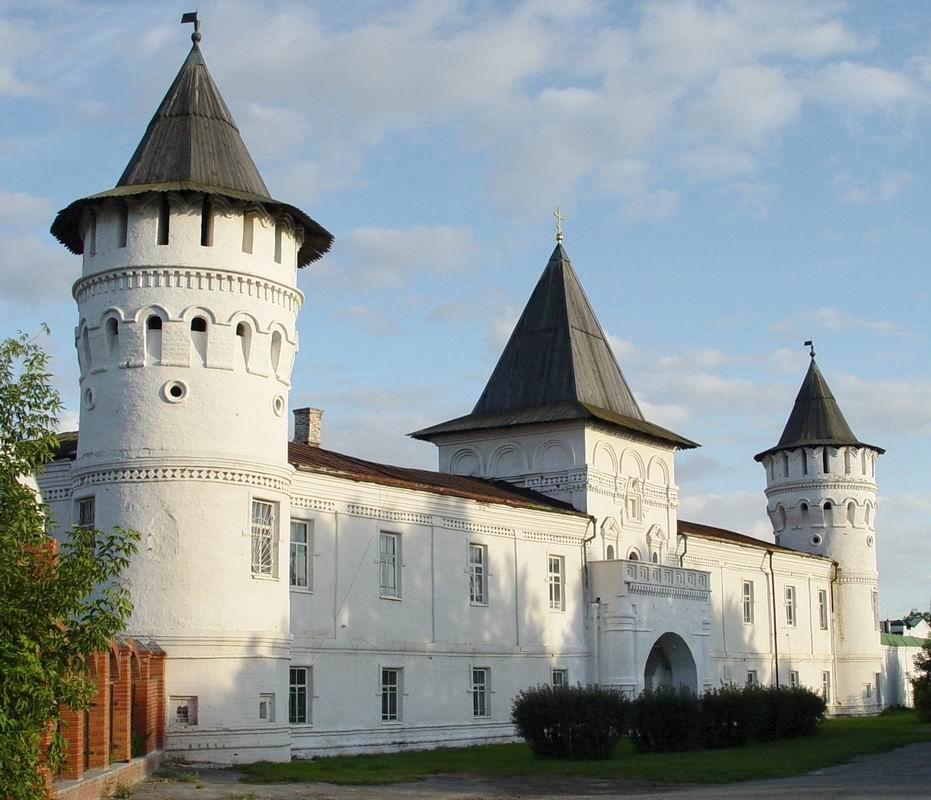
Gostiny Dvor

Knyaz M. Gagarin, appointed in 1708 first governor of the Siberian province, planned to create in the Kremlin impressive buildings for military administrative and commercial use, which should have constituted, together with the Sofia court a monumental center. In construction works were employed Swedish prisoners of war who were in exile in Tobolsk. To prevent the erosion of the mountain, the Tobol River was moved to the south for two versts. In 1712, by the project of Remezov was built the stone tower Demetrius gate and next to it, on the edge of the mountain, the Ascension church (destroyed in 1717).

Despite the 1714 ban of stone construction, work continued until 1718. After the execution of governor Gagarin, the Demetrius gate remained unfinished. In 1743-1746 was built the Church of the Intercession, accessory building of St Sophia-Assumption Cathedral. Walls and towers were gradually destroyed. In 1799 were built the stone retaining walls of St. Sophia gully and a new multi-tier bell tower - the tallest building of the city.

== Protection and reconstruction ==
In 1939 the Tobolsk Kremlin has been recognized architectural historical monument, subject to state protection. In 1952, a progressive deterioration of masonry was revealed and thus a plan for restoration work was drafted. In 1961, the Tobolsk museum received the status of Historical and Architectural Museum-Reserve.

In early 1970s the restoration works began. The walls and the towers were reconstructed.

The photograph taken 2009 by Prime Minister Dmitry Medvedev was auctioned for charity at the St Petersburg Christmas yarmarka (fair) in 2010 for the equivalent of U$1.75 million, earning it a place on the list of most expensive photographs.
