= Kremlin, Virginia =

Unincorporated community in Virginia, US

Coordinates: 38°01′46″N 76°41′29″W

Kremlin is an unincorporated community in Westmoreland County, Virginia, United States.
