= Tula Kremlin =

- Тульский кремль (Russian)
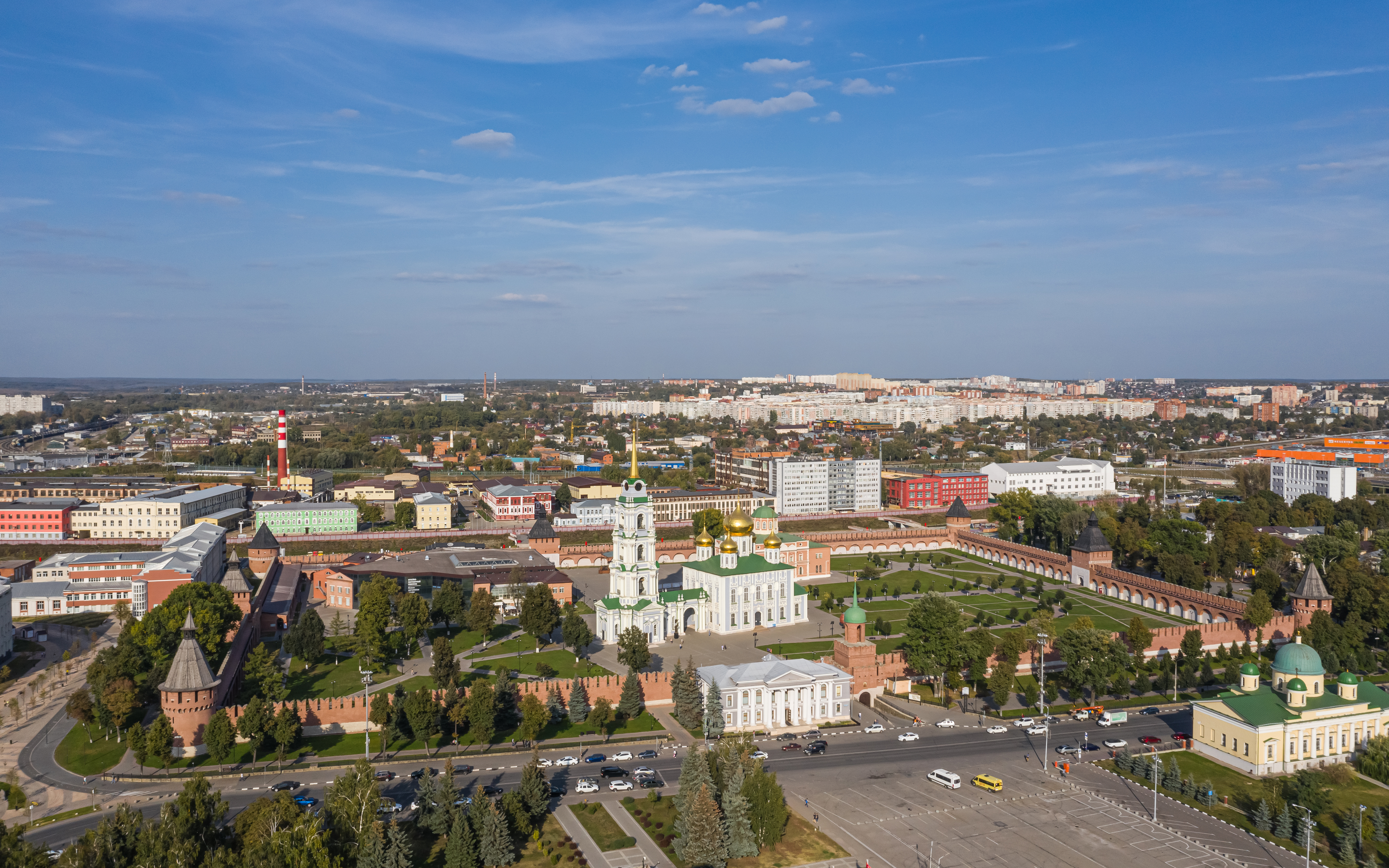
- Interactive map of Tula Kremlin
- 54°11′43″N 37°37′12″E
- Location: Tula, Russia

History
- Built: 1514-1520

Site notes
- Area: 6 hectares (0.060 km^{2})

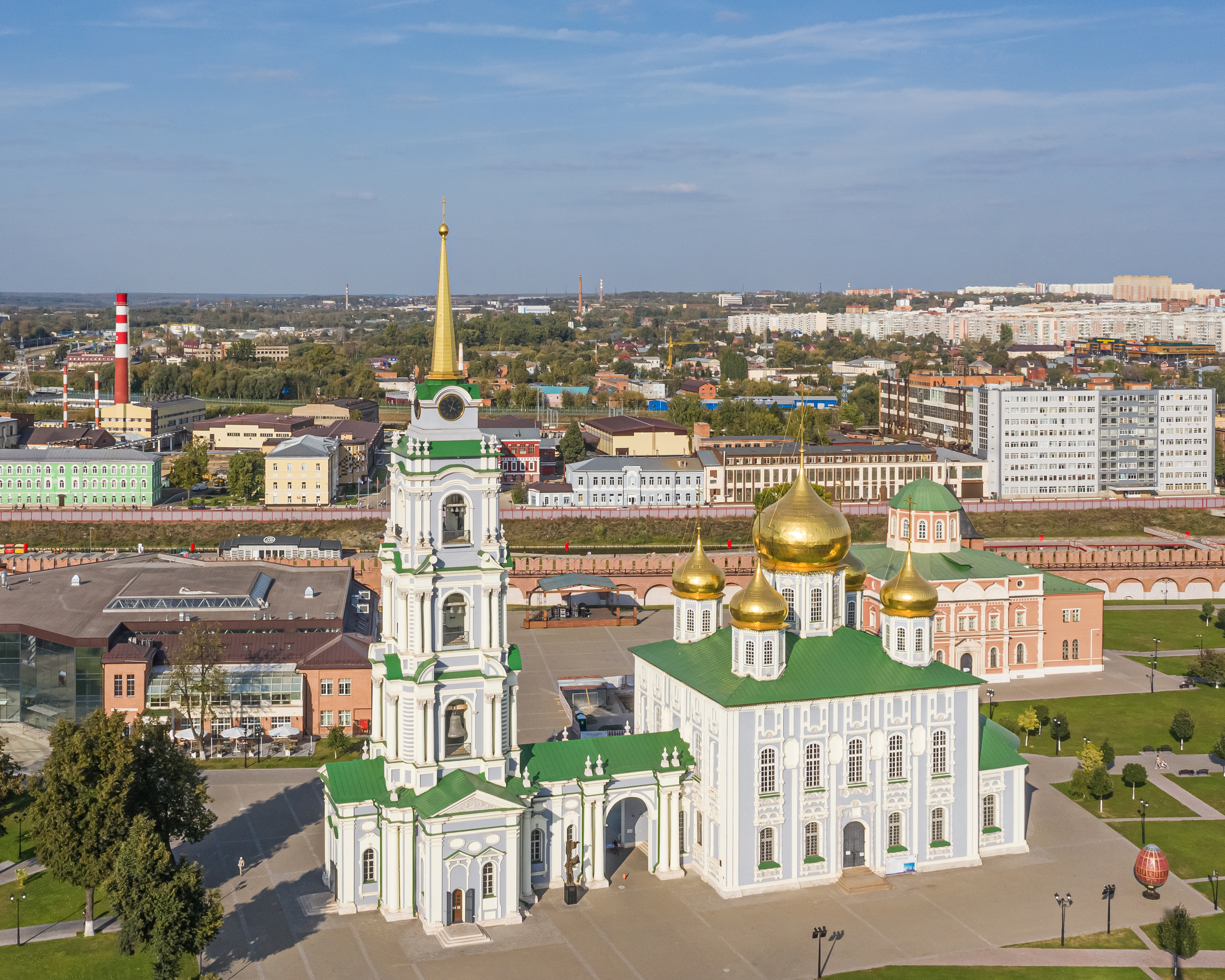
Assumption Cathedral

The Tula Kremlin (Russian: Тульский кремль) is a fortress in Tula, Russia, which was constructed in the early 16th century.

There are two cathedrals within the Kremlin:

- Assumption Cathedral (1762-1766)
- Epiphany Cathedral (1855-1863)

== History ==
In 1507 Vasily III gave the order to construct an oak fortress in Tula on the left bank of the Upa River. In 1514 in an oak fortress, like in the Moscow Kremlin, Vasily III issued an order to construct the "stone city", built in 1520 (1521).

In 1552, was besieged by the Crimean khan Devlet I Giray. At that time, Tsar Ivan IV was with campaign against Kazan. Urban population fought before the arrival of reinforcements from the tsar's army from Kolomna. In memory of these events in the Tula Kremlin has been established the foundation stone near the Tower of Ivanovskie Gate.

In the second half of the 16th century, around the stone Kremlin was created Posad - a wooden fortress that more than ten times more the size of the stone Kremlin. This area at the time was the boundary of Tula.

In 1605 bell informed the residents about the arrival of the False Dmitry I and Tula for two weeks turned into pseudo capital of Moscow State. It was here in the Kremlin, came to swear allegiance to the pretender boyars and nobles.

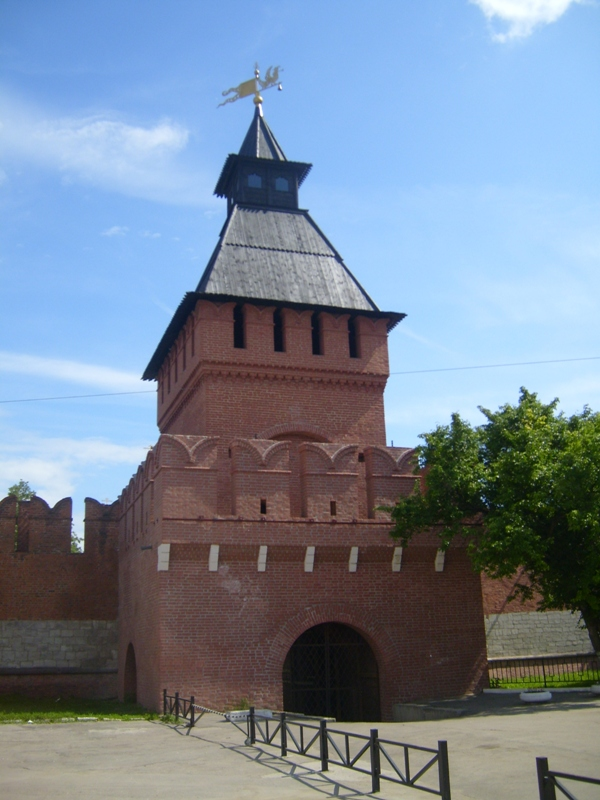
Tower of Pyatnitsky Gate

In 1607, during the Peasants' War, the Tula Kremlin became the refuge for Ivan Bolotnikov. Together with people loyal to him, he kept the Kremlin by his control for four months. In 1608 in the Tula Kremlin by Tsar Vasily Shuisky were besieged the leaders of the peasant movement - Ivan Bolotnikov and Ileyko Muromets. Kremlin stand very long siege but was taken due creation a dam of the bags to the ground on Upa River. Water from the river flooded the Kremlin, and the rebels surrendered. In memory of these events in 1953 in the Tula Kremlin was erected an obelisk.

In the middle of 17th century Kremlin completely left its significance.

After the reunification of left-bank Ukraine and Russia in the middle of the 17th century, Kremlin completely lost its importance in the time of Peter the fortresses in the registers are no longer covered.

Repair work in the Kremlin carried out at the end of the 18th and 19th centuries, in 1930 the walls of the Kremlin removed all the dilapidated buildings in the 1950s had a partial renovation, and in mid-1960 was conducted complex complete scientific restoration in order to restore the original appearance of the Kremlin.

In 2012 a charitable foundation was created named "Tula Kremlin" which has 1648 benefactors, to transfer money for the restoration of the Kremlin. In the same year at the expense of the charity fund held drainage from tower to tower Odoevskogo water gate. In 2013, work was done to restore and improve the shopping malls, installed a new marquee Naugolnykh tower restored battlements on the wall between Nikita and Ivanovo towers. At the same time the fund restored the Assumption Cathedral, whose facade has got a gray color, and the domes covered with gold leaf. From 2012 to 2014 the Kremlin was under large-scale reconstruction of the walls, and from the territory has been bred plant, located there since the beginning of the 20th century. From 2012 to 2014 in the Kremlin saw the reconstruction of the bell tower of the Assumption Cathedral, which was destroyed in the 1930s.

Since 2014 it conducted the reconstruction of the former substation, which included in the museum complex (the atrium), which consists of four exhibition halls: Museum of Military History Tula Oblast, Folk Art Museum, Tula region, Tula samovars and Museum and Museum of the History stick Tula Kremlin. The complex includes a room which hosts temporary exhibitions, and conduct forums, meetings and conferences.

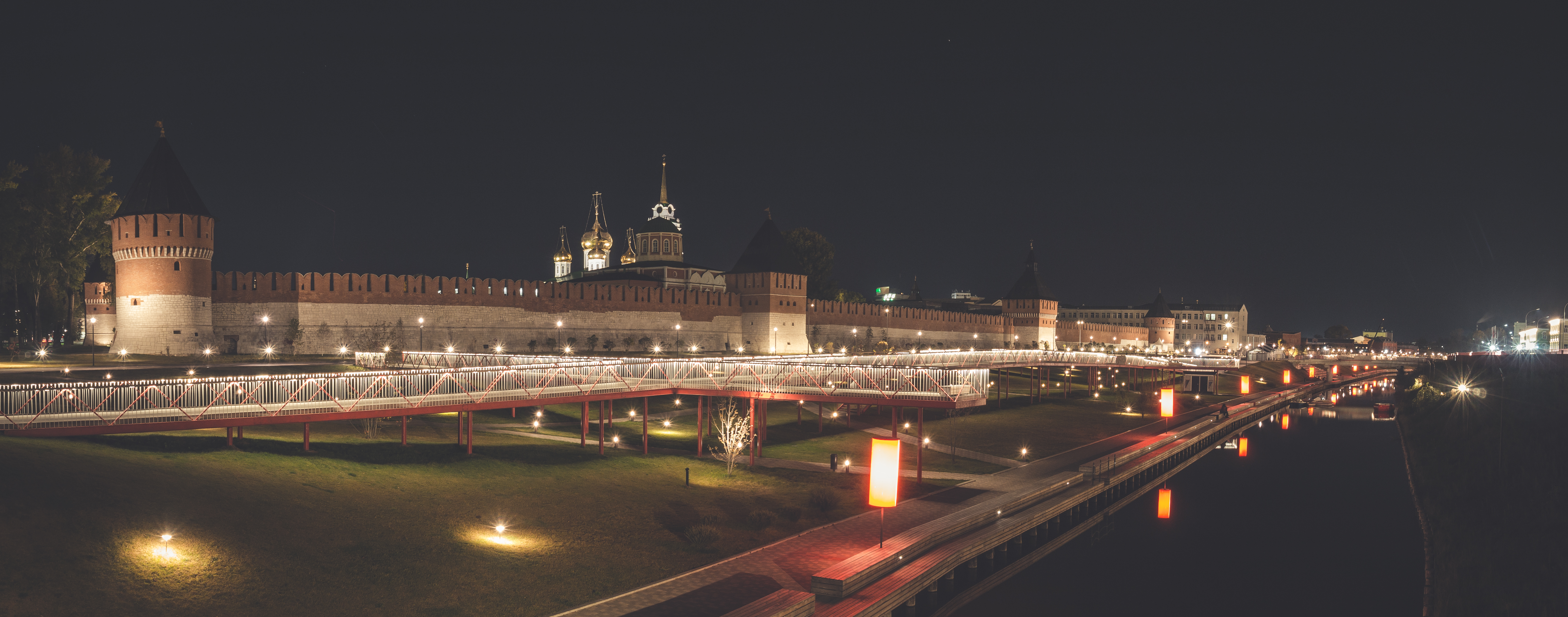
Evening view of the Tula Kremlin from the Kazanskaya embankment

== Towers ==
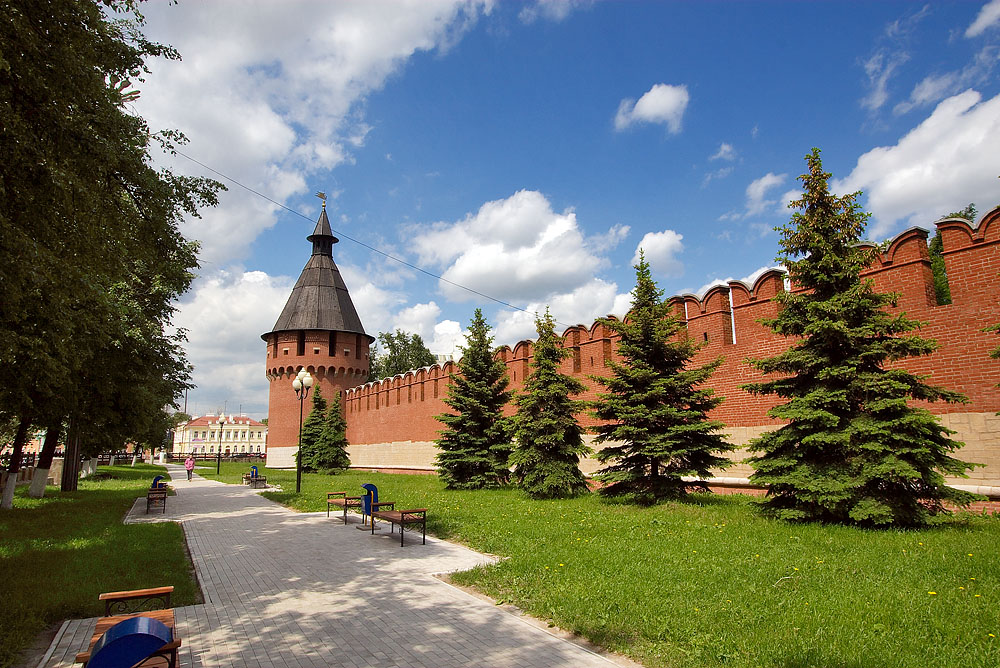
Spasskaya Tower

- Spasskaya Tower
- Tower of Odoevsky Gate
- Nikitinskaya Tower
- Tower of Ivanosky Gate
- Ivanovskaya Tower
- Tower Na Pogrebu
- Tower of Water Gate
- Naugolnaya Tower
- Tower of Pyatnitsky Gate
