= Novgorod Detinets =

Historic fortress in Veliky Novgorod, Novgorod Oblast, Russia

Coordinates: 58°31′15.50″N 31°16′32.00″E

- Новгородский детинец (Russian)
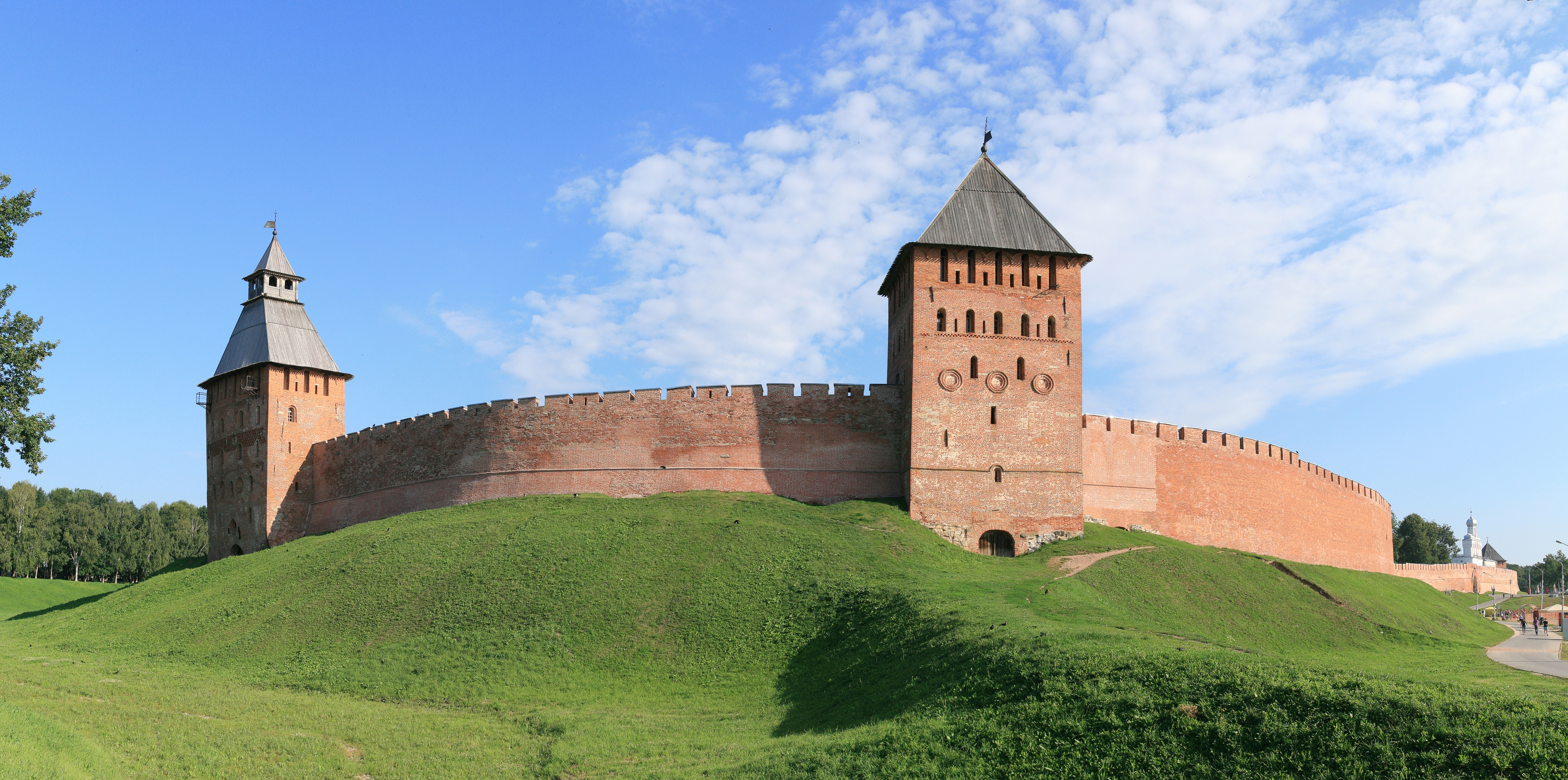
- Interactive map of Novgorod Detinets
- Location: Veliky Novgorod, Novgorod Oblast, Russia

History
- Rebuilt: 15th century

UNESCO World Heritage Site
- Official name: Historic Monuments of Novgorod and Surroundings
- Type: Cultural
- Criteria: ii, iv, vi
- Designated: 1992 (16th session)
- Reference no.: 604
- Region: Eastern Europe

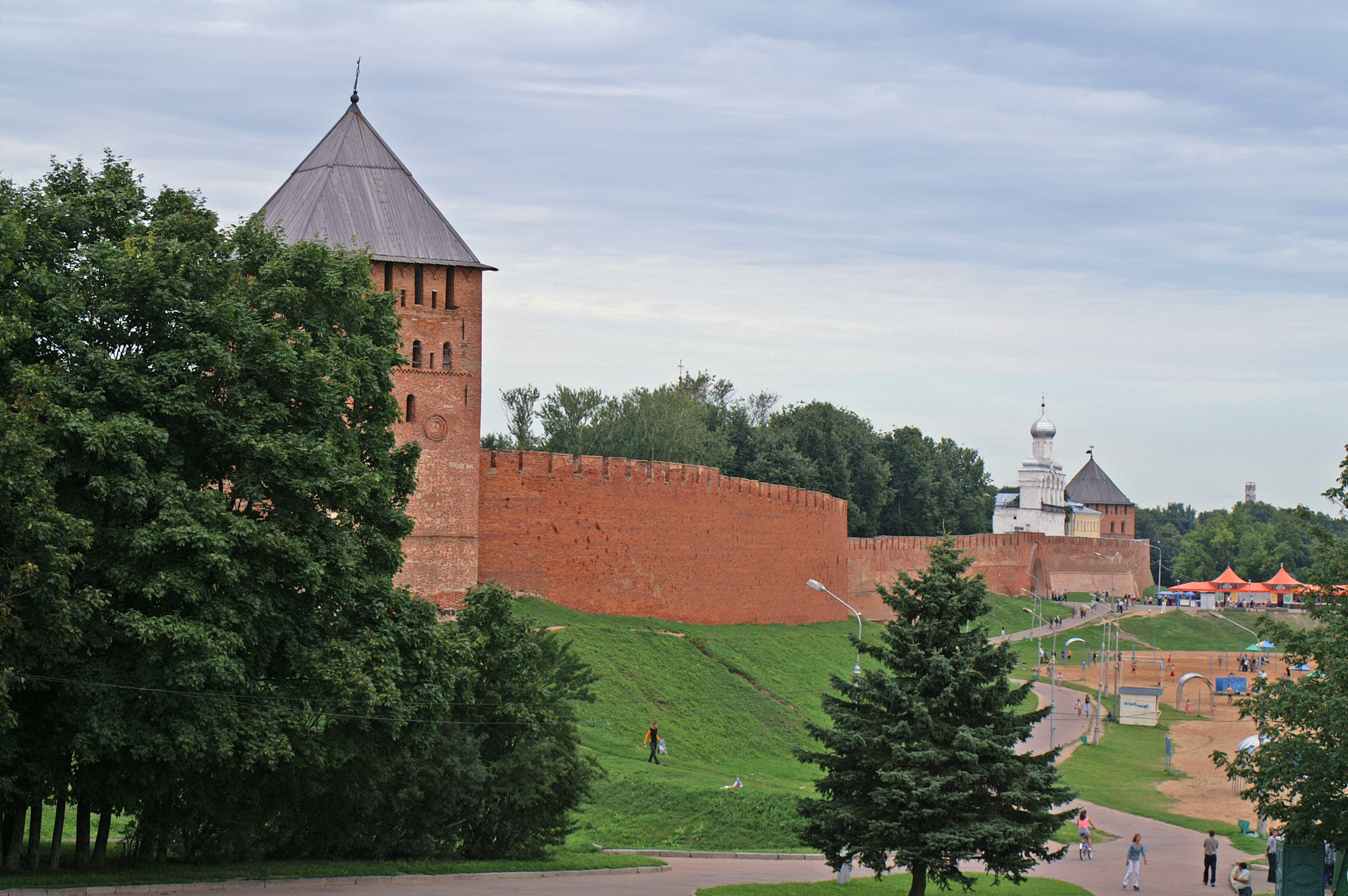
The eastern wall of the Novgorod Detinets

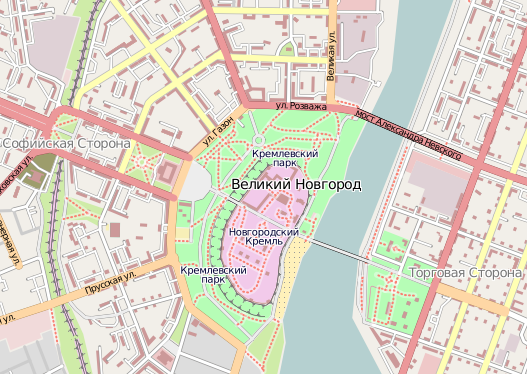
Map of Novgorod Kremlin

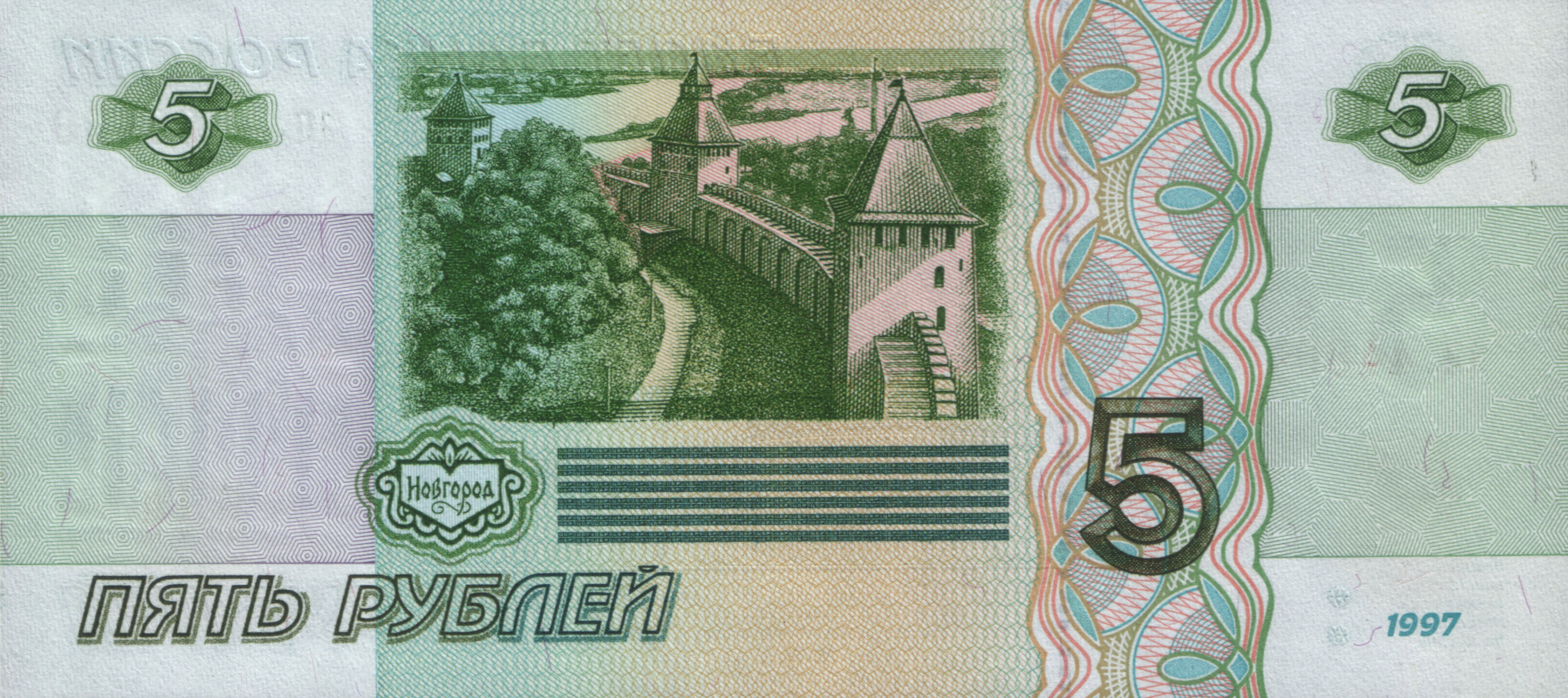
Novgorod Kremlin Wall on a 5-ruble banknote

The Novgorod Detinets (Russian: Новгородский детинец, romanized: Novgorodskiy detinets), also known as the Novgorod Kremlin (Russian: Новгородский кремль, romanized: Novgorodskiy kreml'), is a fortified complex (detinets) in Veliky Novgorod, Russia. It stands on the left bank of the Volkhov River about two miles north of where it empties out of Lake Ilmen.

== History ==
The compound was originally the site of a pagan burial ground upon which the first bishop of Novgorod, Ioakim Korsunianin, built the Cathedral of Holy Wisdom upon his arrival in the area in 989 or so. Thus the compound was and remained largely an ecclesiastical site, although many Novgorodian boyars built their houses in the southern part of the Detinets.

The first reference of the fortification on the site dates to 1044, with additional construction taking place in 1116. These were probably earthen embankments topped by a wooden palisade, although stone towers and walls were built in 1302. Archbishop Vasily Kalika (1330-1352) rebuilt the stone wall along the eastern side of the Detinets in 1331-1335. The rest was completed in stone only in 1400. Under the rule of Archbishop Evfimy II (1429-1458), a council hall for the nobility council and a clocktower were built in the episcopal compound in 1433 and 1436 respectively. The council hall, now called the Episcopal Chamber or the Chamber of Facets due to its elaborate Gothic vaults, is one of the easternmost examples of Brick Gothic. In 1437, part of Vasily's walls collapsed into the Volkhov River and were rebuilt by Evfimy II, too.

=== Modern construction ===
The fortress was rebuilt between 1484 and 1490 by Muscovite builders in the wake of Grand Prince Ivan III's conquest of the city in 1478; a third of it was paid for by the Novgorodian archbishop Gennady, a Muscovite appointee (1484-1504). It is a large oval 545 metres long and 240 metres wide with nine surviving towers (three additional towers have not survived). The tallest tower, the Kokui tower, is capped by a silver dome. It was built in the 18th century, and its name is of Swedish origin. Today it is possible to enter this tower and climb to the top. The walls are 1,487 metres in circumference.

== Layout ==
The main buildings in the Detinets are the Cathedral of Holy Wisdom and the archiepiscopal/metropolitan compound in the northwestern corner. To the south of this, across the plaza in which stands the Monument to the Thousand Years of Russia, is the Novgorod Museum and the Novgorod Regional Library, housed in what had in the imperial period been the administrative building of Novgorod. The museum houses a fine icon collection and other artifacts from the city's history. Several smaller churches (the Church of the Intercession of the Mother of God along the southwestern wall near the Pokrovskii (Intercession) and Kokui towers, and the Church of St. Andrew Stratelates near the southeastern wall, and other buildings are found south of the museum, an area of the Detinets that has been left as a park. There are numerous references in the chronicles to no longer extant buildings, including chapels over the gates (there were six in the republican period) and the Church of Sts. Boris and Gleb, built by Sitko Sitinits, who is thought to be the historic source for the legendary Sadko. An eternal flame to the soldiers of the German-Soviet War can be seen just inside the west gate of the fortress.

A public beach has been formed between the southeastern part of the Kremlin and the Volkhov river.

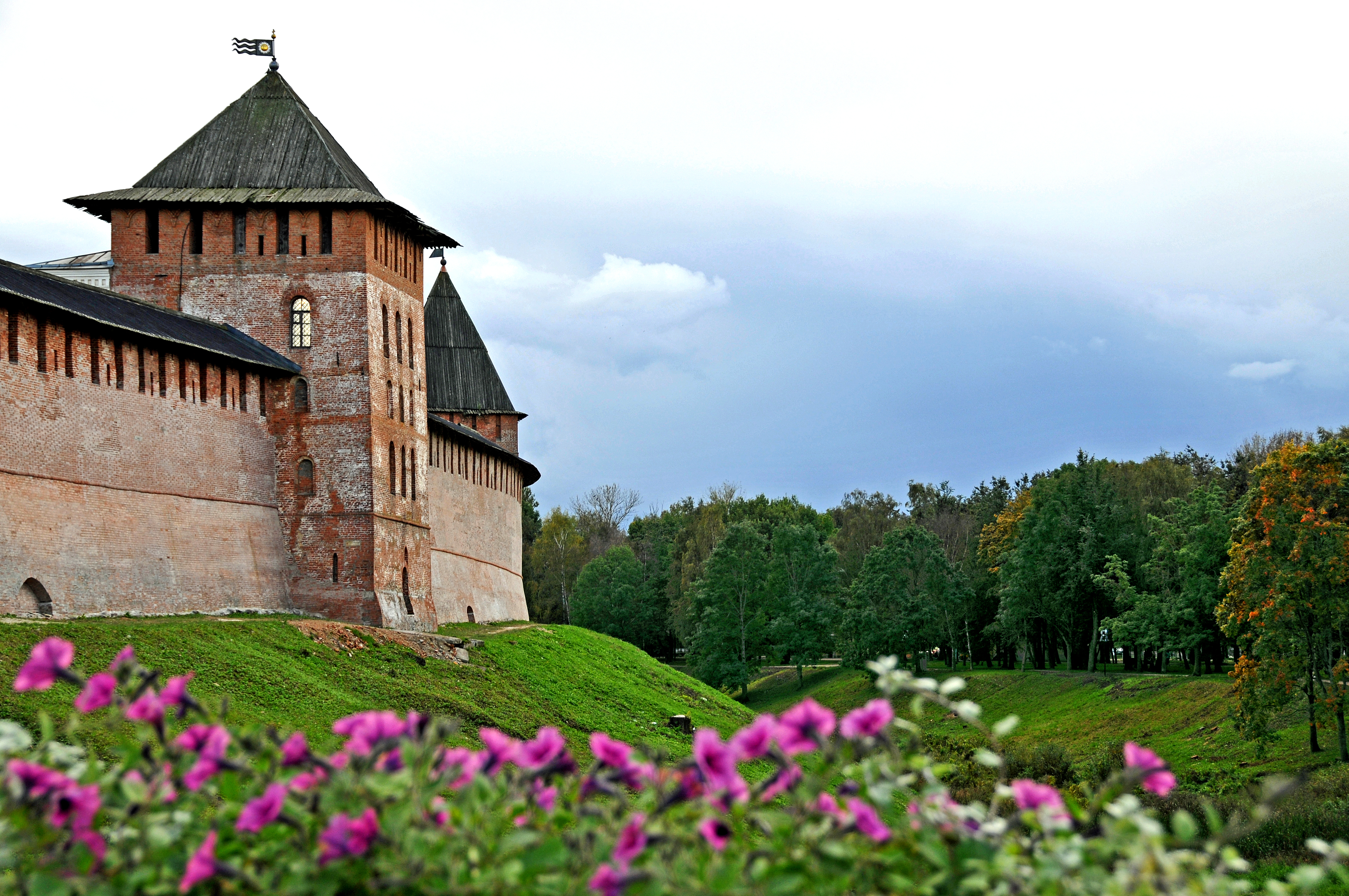
Kremlin (or Detinets) towers and wall, Spring 2009

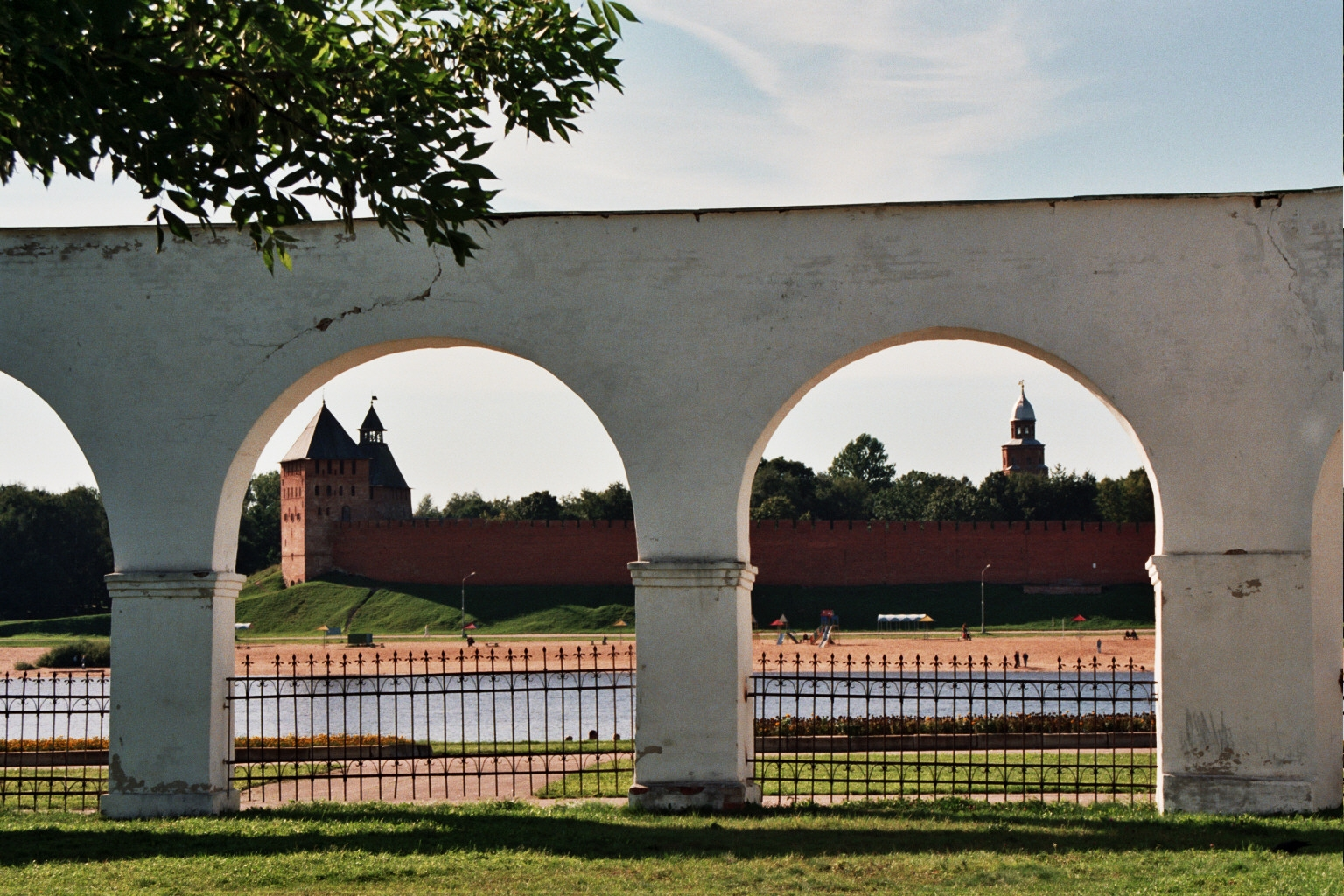
View from across the Volkhov River

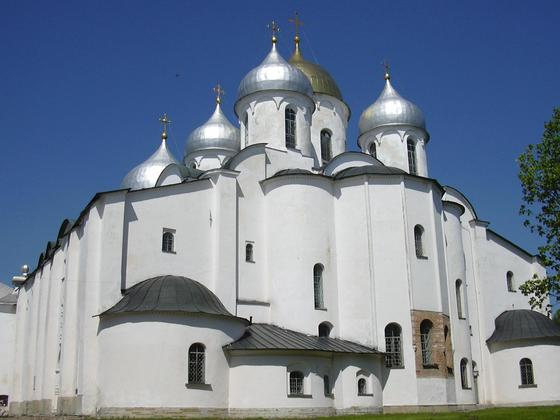
Cathedral of Holy Wisdom

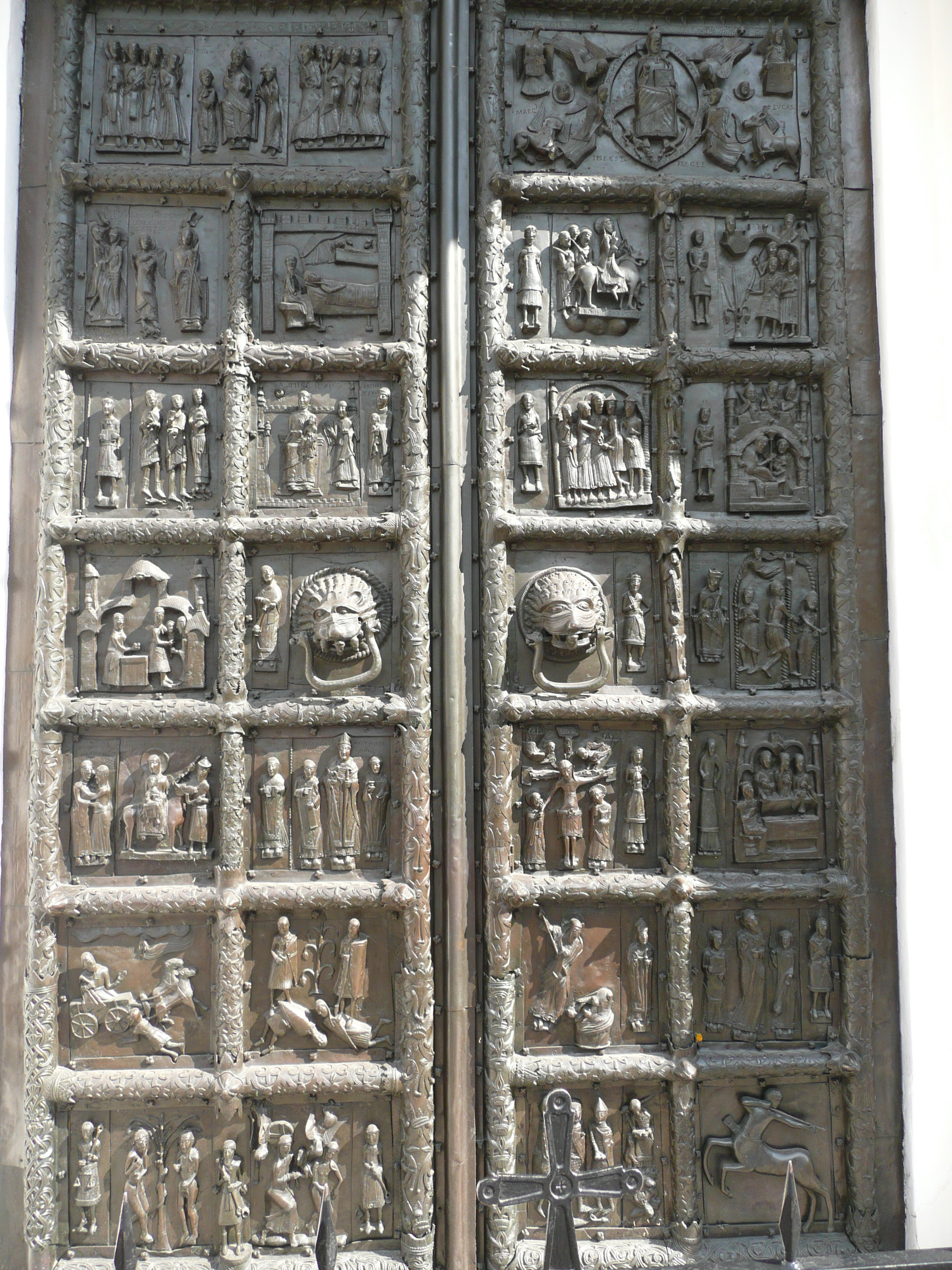
Cathedral doors
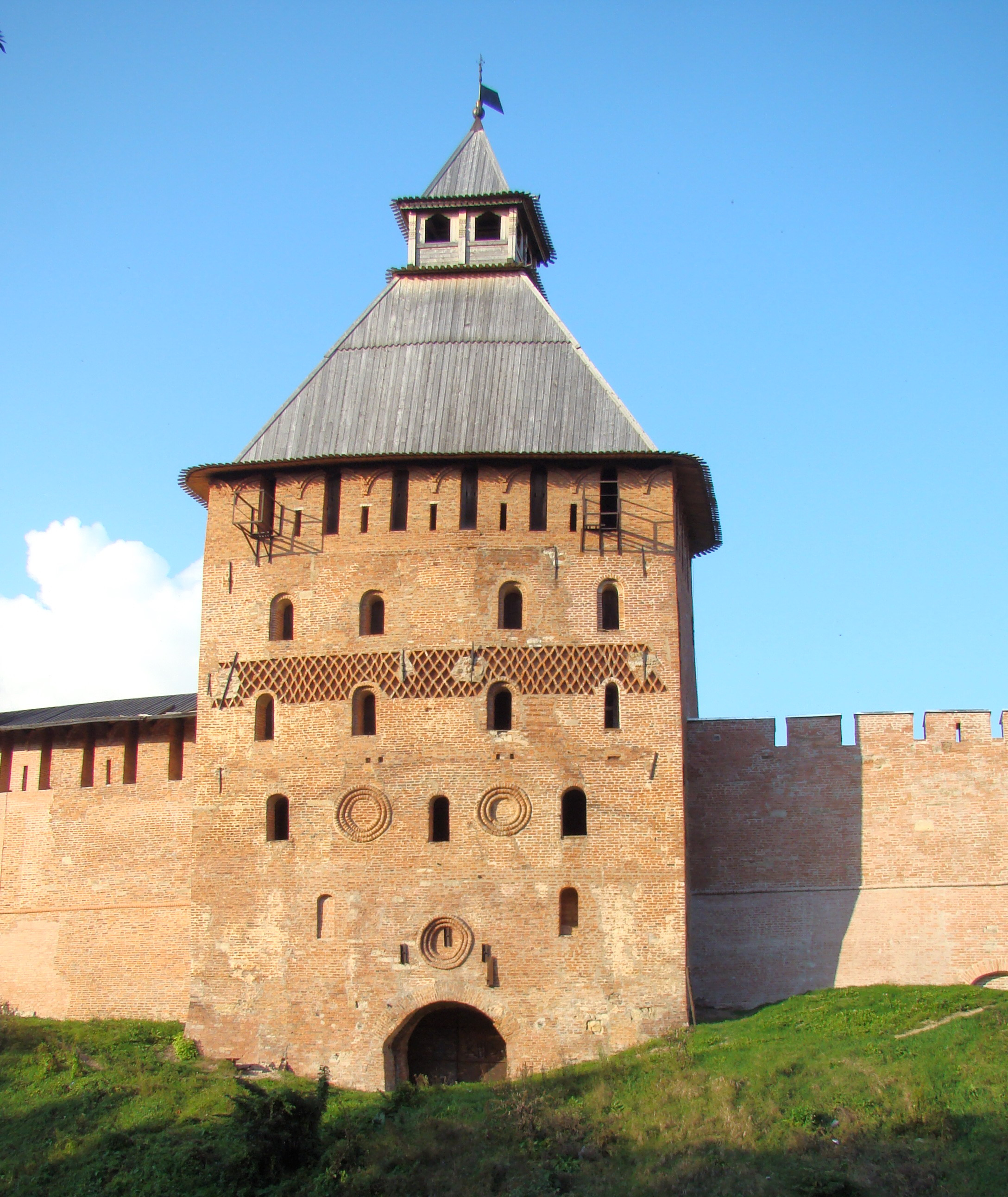
Spasskaya Tower at the south side of the wall

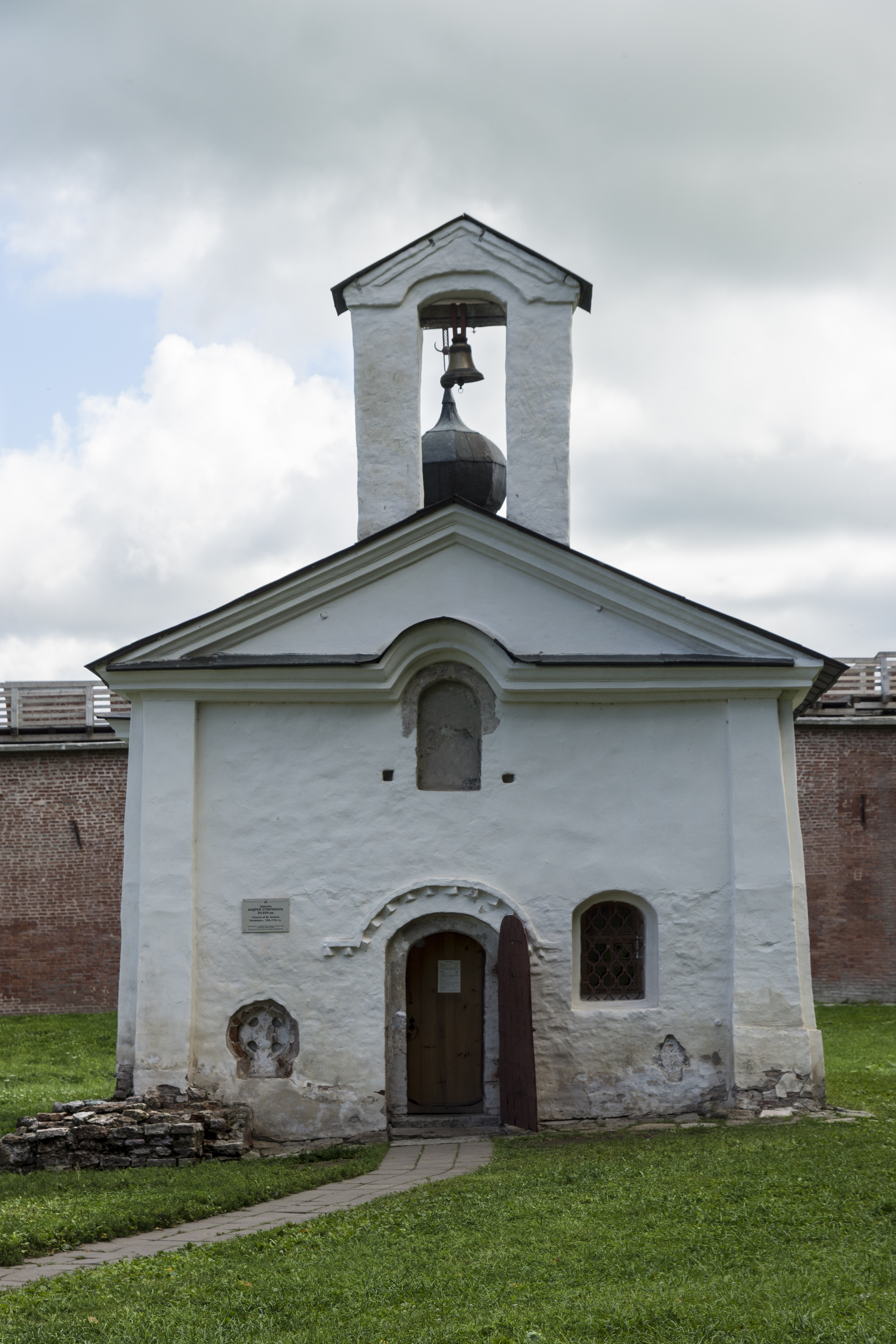
Saint Andrew Stratelates church

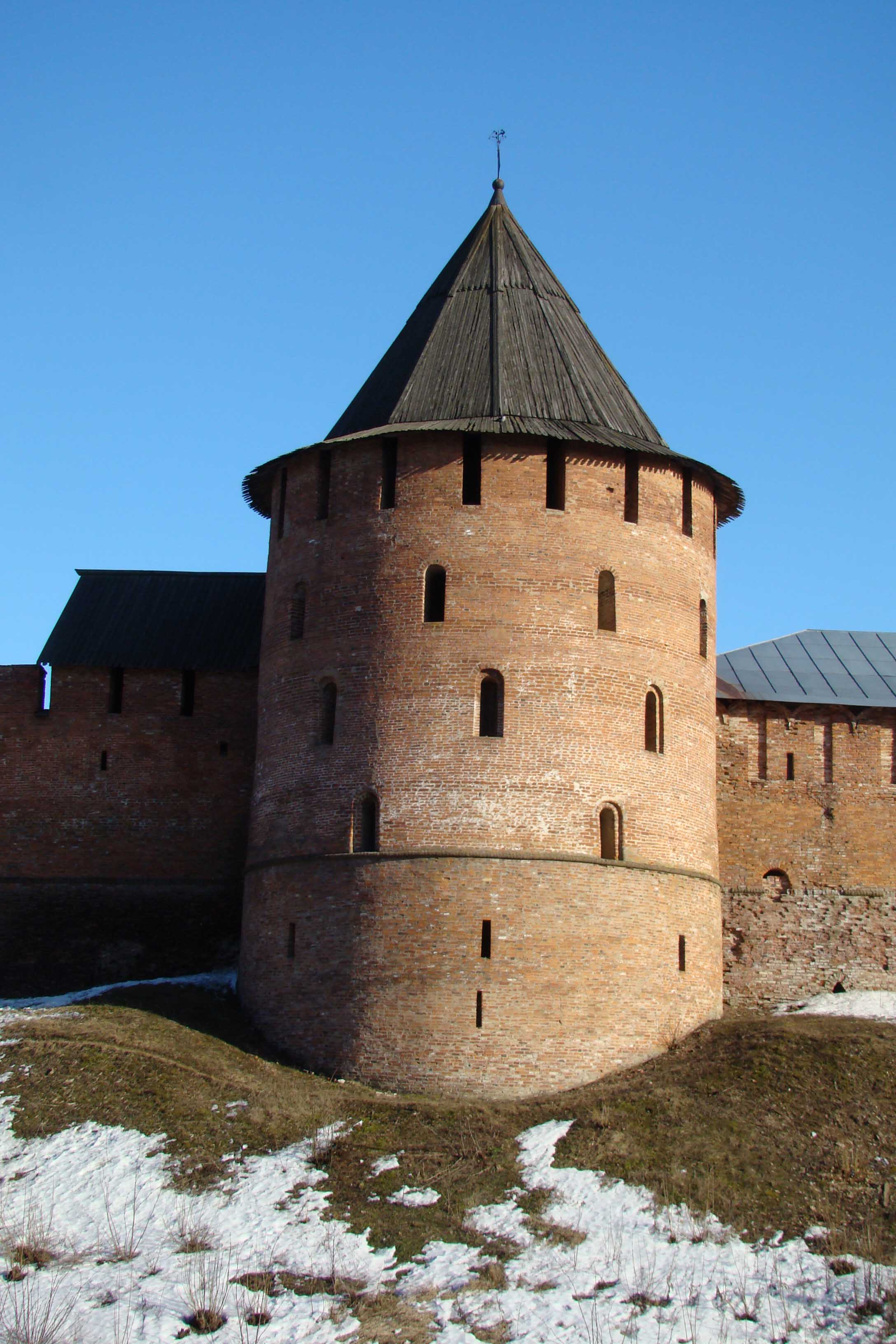
Metropolitan tower

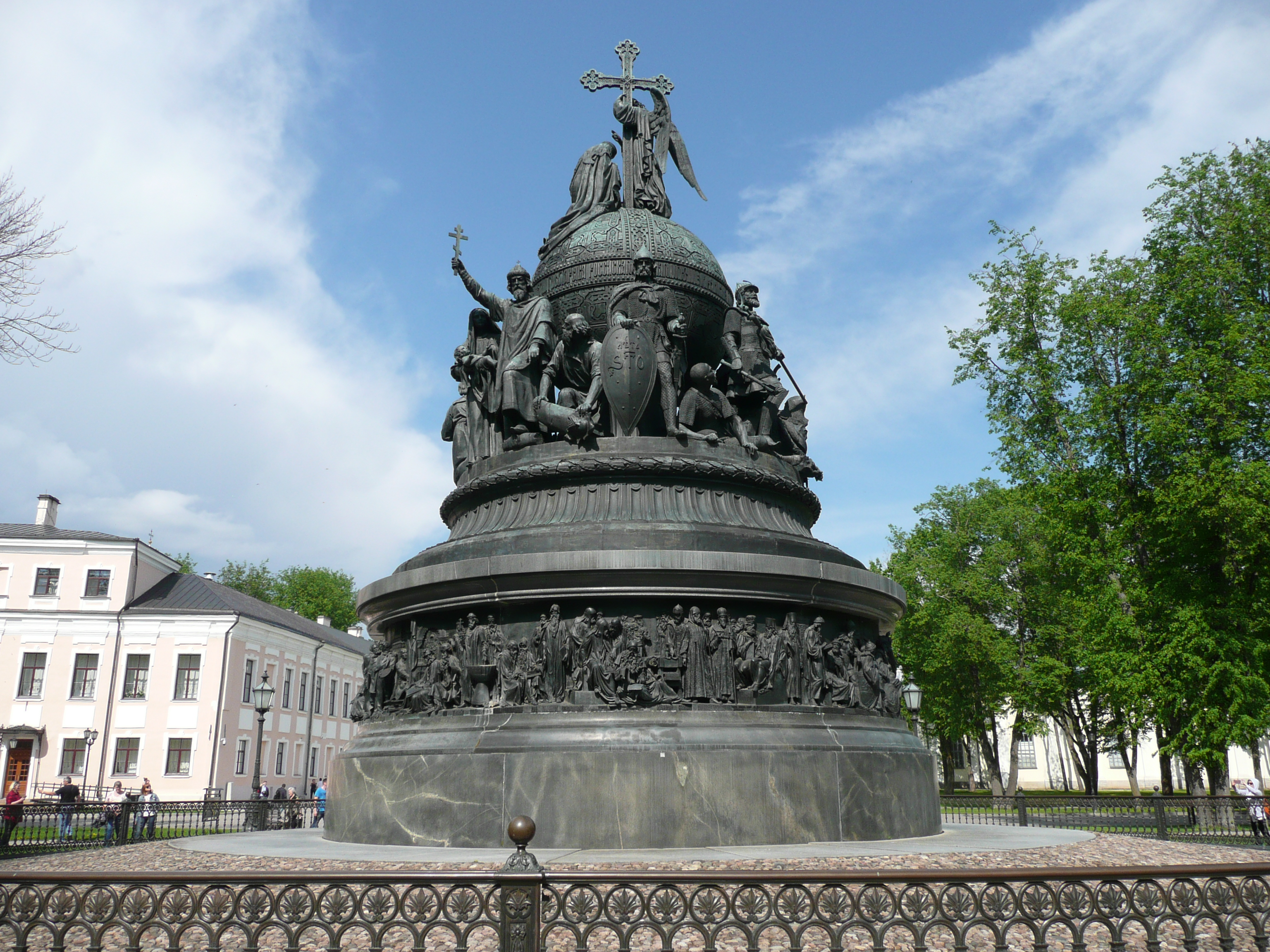
Monument to the Thousand Years of Russia
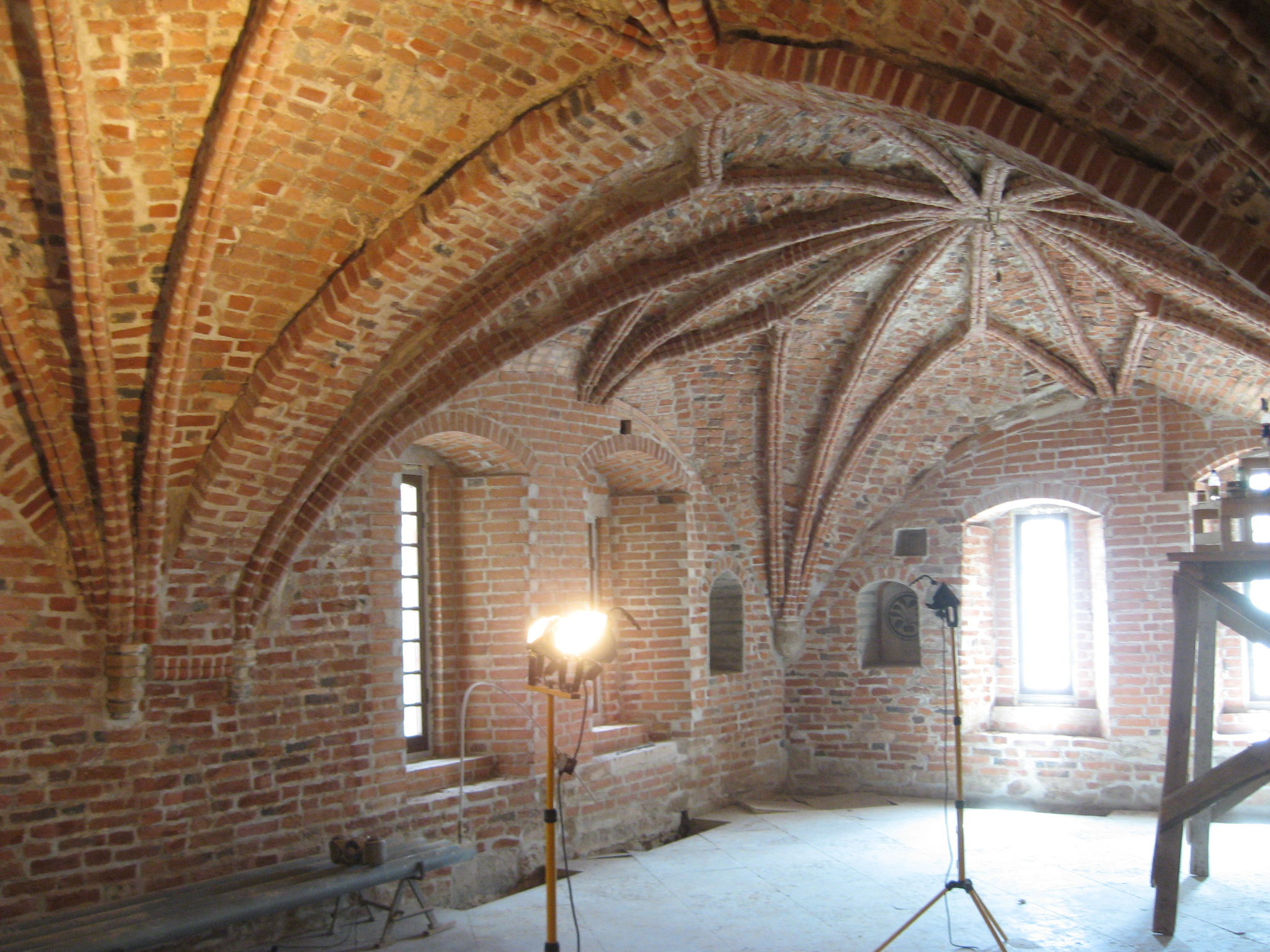
Chamber of Facets

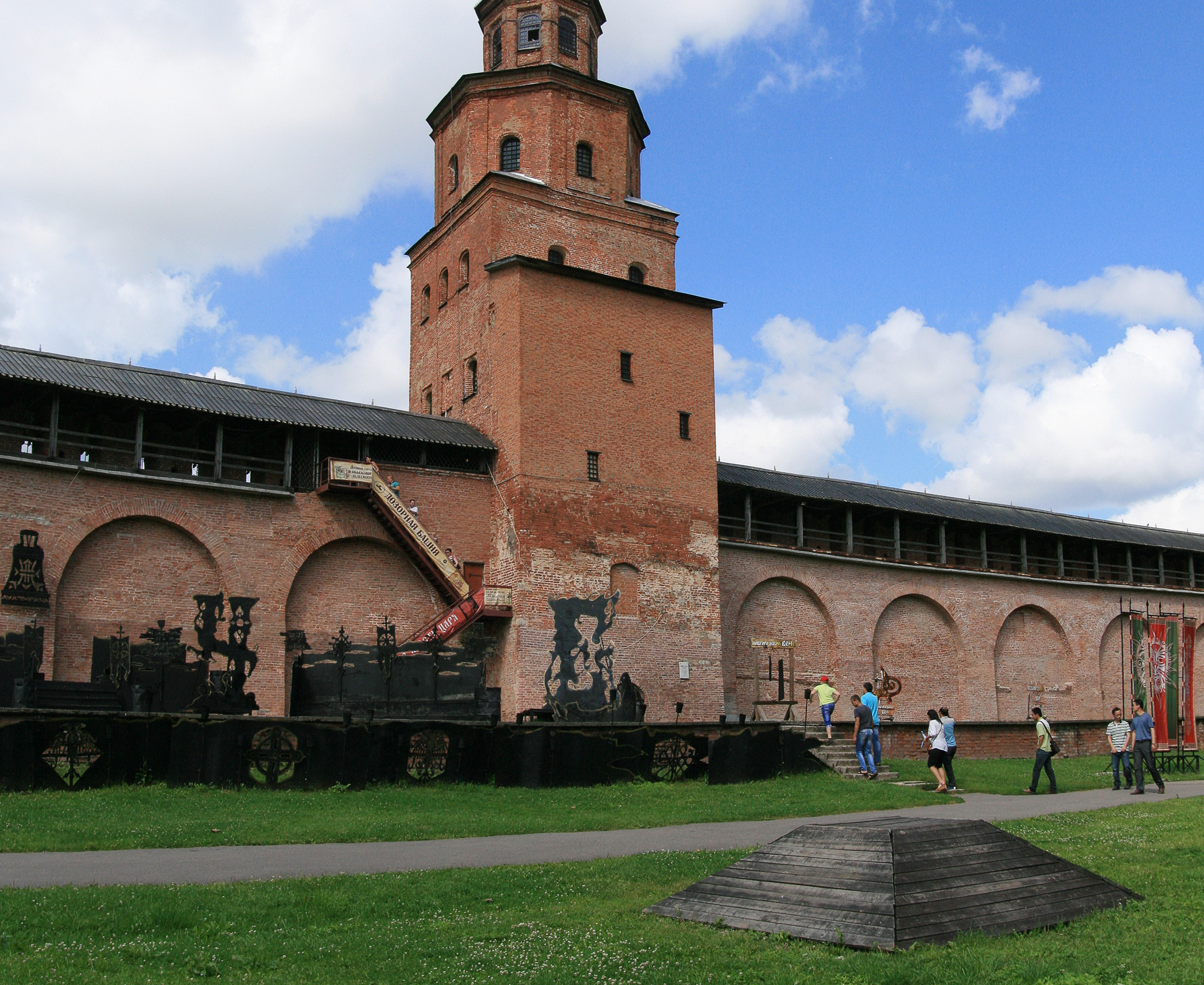
Voevodsky Court

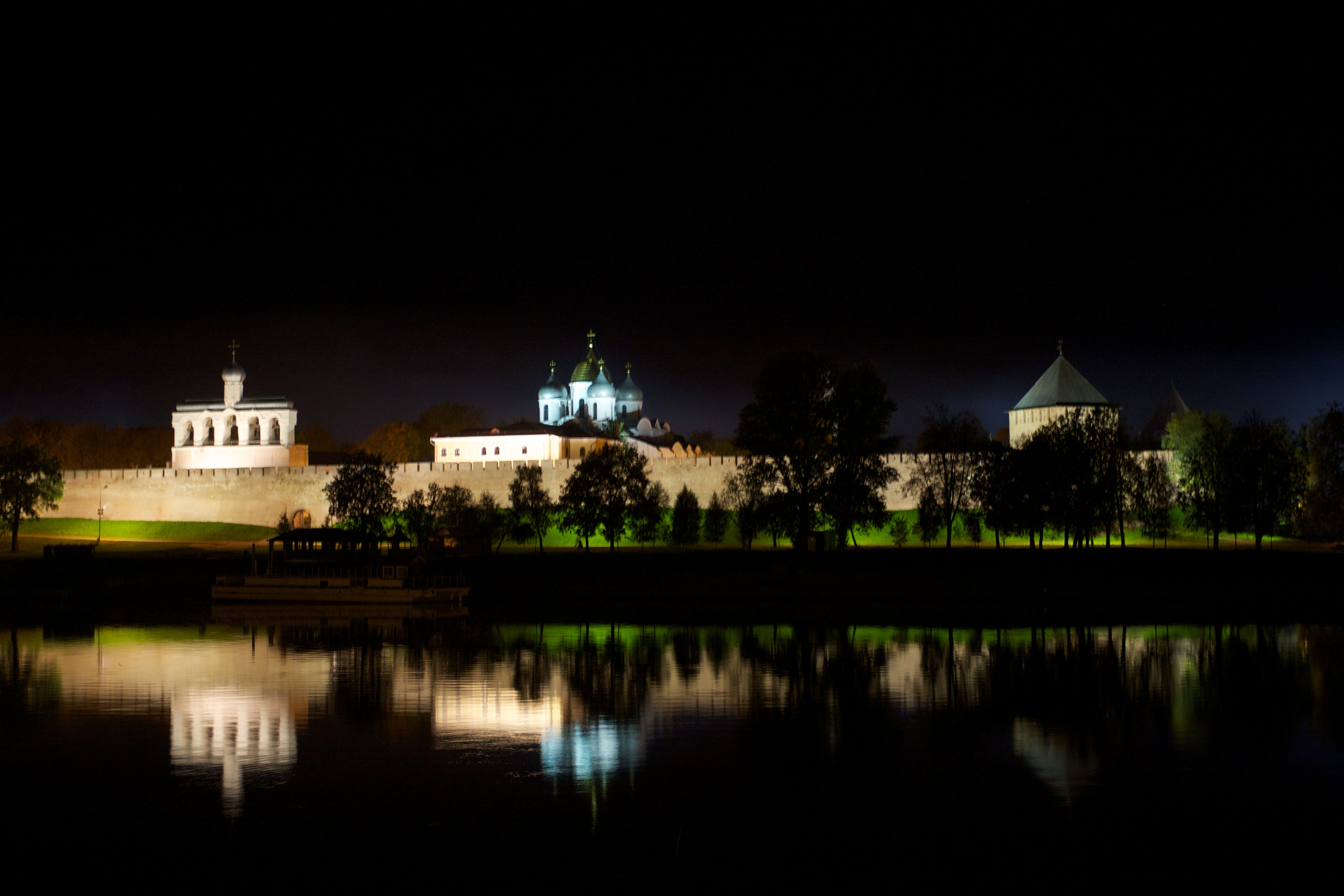
A view across the Volkhov at night

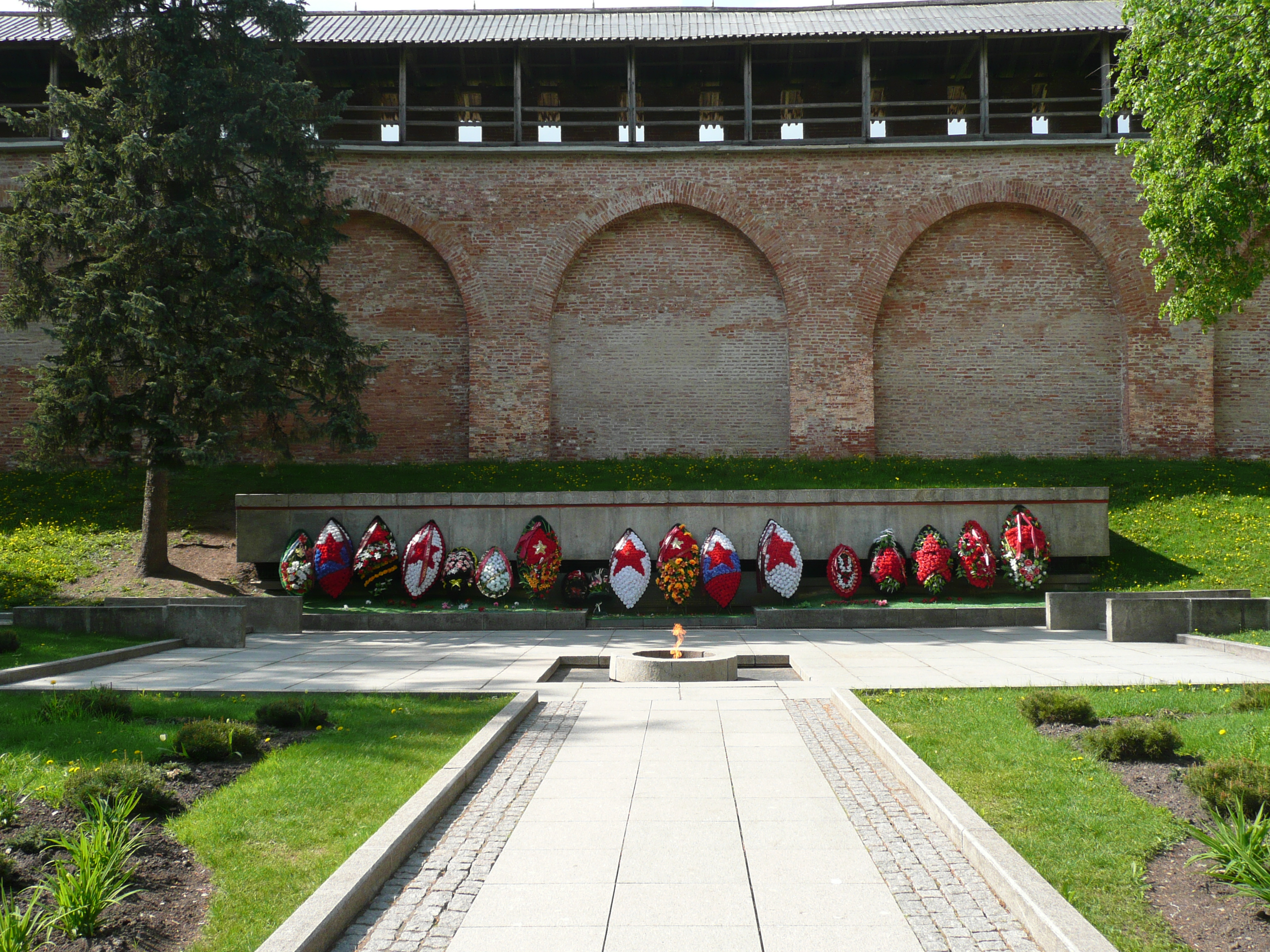
Eternal Flame War Memorial
