= Vysokopetrovsky Monastery =

Russian Orthodox monastery in Moscow

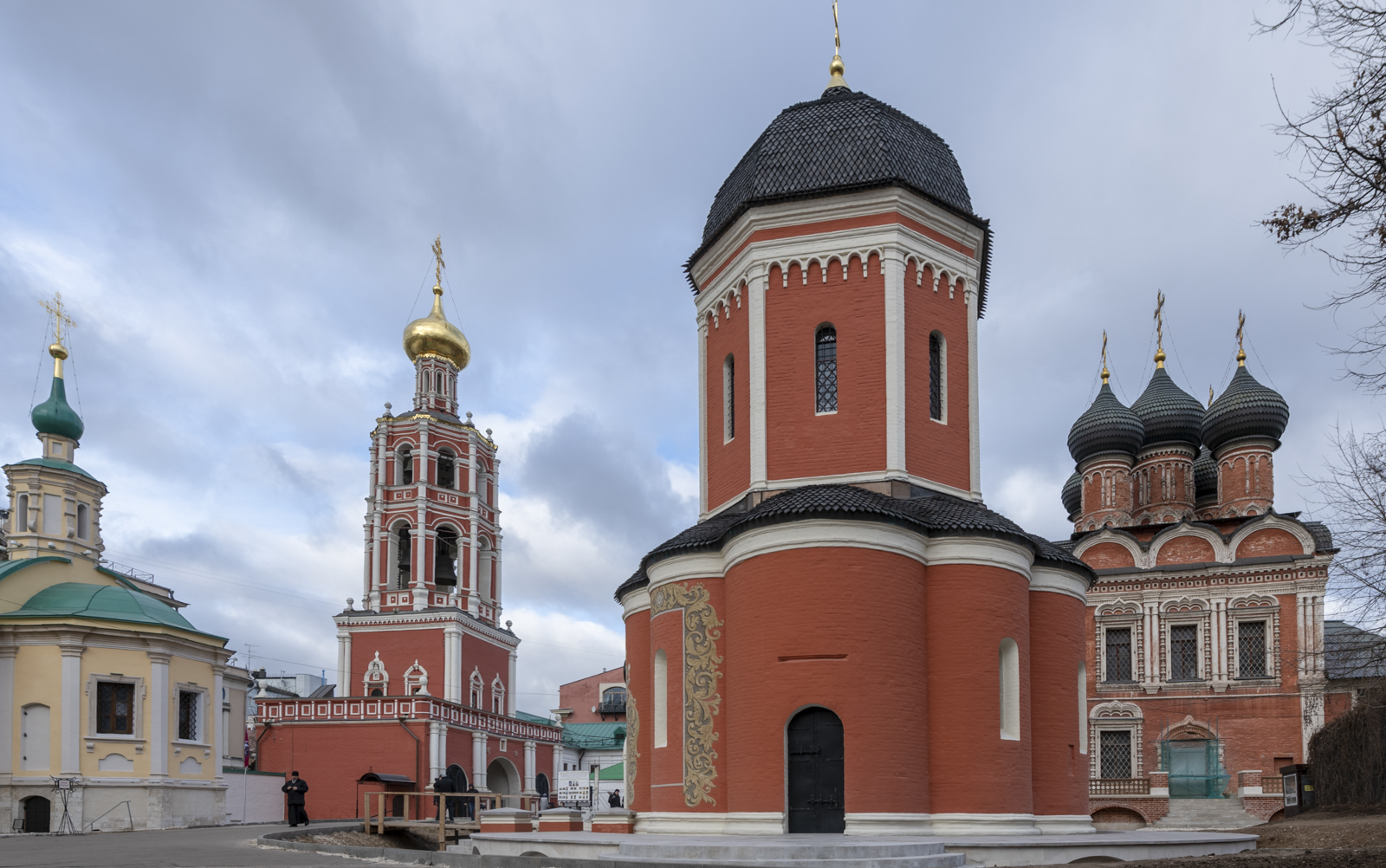
- Interactive map of Vysokopetrovsky Monastery

Monastery information
- Order: Orthodox
- Established: 1317
- Disestablished: 1918
- Diocese: Moscow

People
- Founder: Saint Peter of Moscow

Architecture
- Style: Naryshkin Baroque

Site
- Location: Moscow, Russia
- Coordinates: 55°46′02.0″N 37°36′54.0″E

Vysokopetrovsky Monastery (Russian: Высокопетровский монастырь, romanized: Vysokopetrovskiy monastyr'), also translated as High Monastery of St. Peter, is a Russian Orthodox monastery in the Bely Gorod area of Moscow, commanding a hill whence Petrovka Street descends towards the Kremlin.

The monastery is believed to have been founded around the 1320s by Saint Peter of Moscow, the first Russian metropolitan to have his see in Moscow. The cloister gave its name to adjacent Petrovka Street, one of the streets radiating from Red Square.

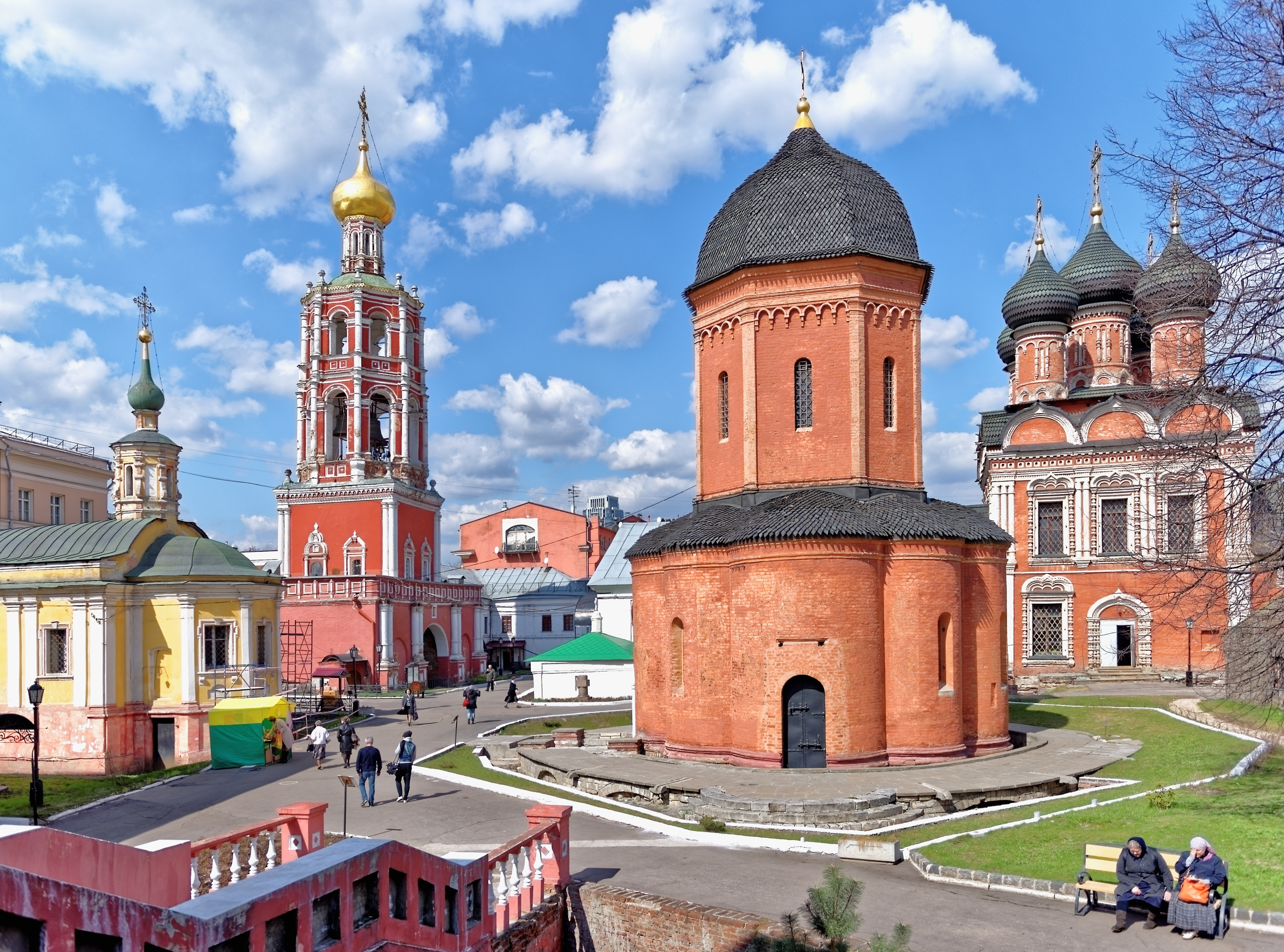
The katholikon (main church) was one of the first rotundas in Russian architecture.

In the late 17th century, the Naryshkin boyars, maternal relatives of Peter the Great, turned the monastery into their family burial place. They had it reconstructed in the Naryshkin Baroque style of architecture associated with their name. In the mid-18th century, several subsidiary structures were added, possibly based on designs by Dmitry Ukhtomsky or Ivan Fyodorovich Michurin.

The katholikon, dedicated to St Peter of Moscow, was long regarded as a typical monument of the Naryshkin style and dated to 1692. In the 1970s, however, detailed studies of written sources and excavations of the site revealed that the katholikon actually had been built in 1514–1517 by Aloisio the New.

After the monastery was closed down by the Soviet authorities in 1929, Archimandrite Bartholomew Remov arranged for the monks and nuns to continue their monastic life in secret at the Nativity Church at Putinki, where he was the Rector. The spiritual life of the monastery continued at Putinki until the NKVD was informed and arrested everyone involved in 1935.

In 1992 several buildings of the monastery were returned to the Russian Orthodox Church. As of 2005, the buildings are shared by the Russian Orthodox Church and the Moscow Literature Museum.

== Structures ==
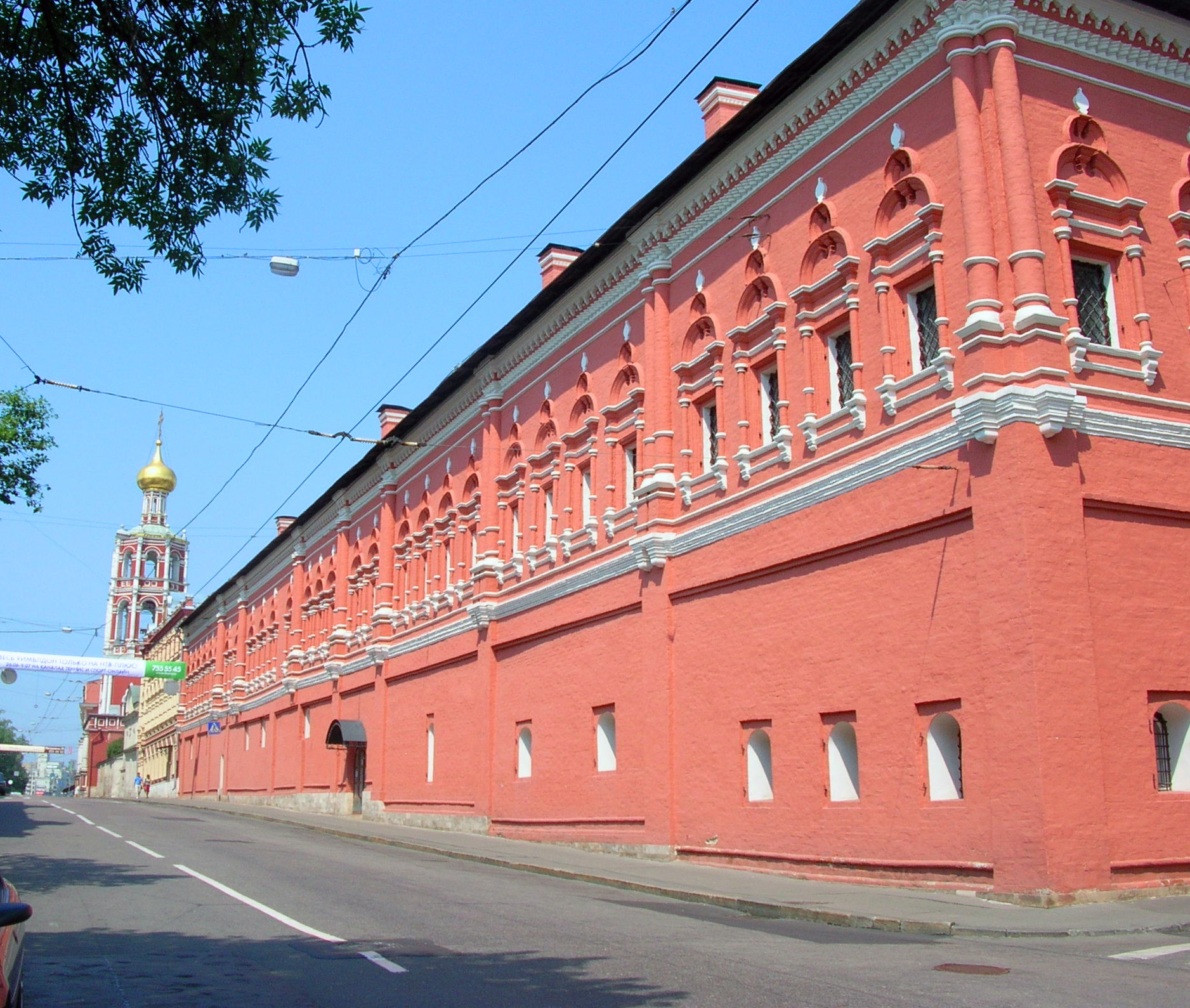
The monastery belltower and monastic cells, commissioned by the Naryshkins, were erected in the 1690s.

- Cathedral of St Peter (1517).
- Church of Our Lady of Bogolyubovo (with a refectory) (1687)
- Church of St. Sergius of Radonezh (with a refectory) (1694)
- Church of St. Pachomius the Great above the monastery gates (1755)
- Church of the Tolga icon of the mother of God (1750)
- Church of the Intercession above the monastery gates, with a belltower. (1694)
- Church (former chapel) of Our Lady of Kazan (inside the former gates under the belltower).
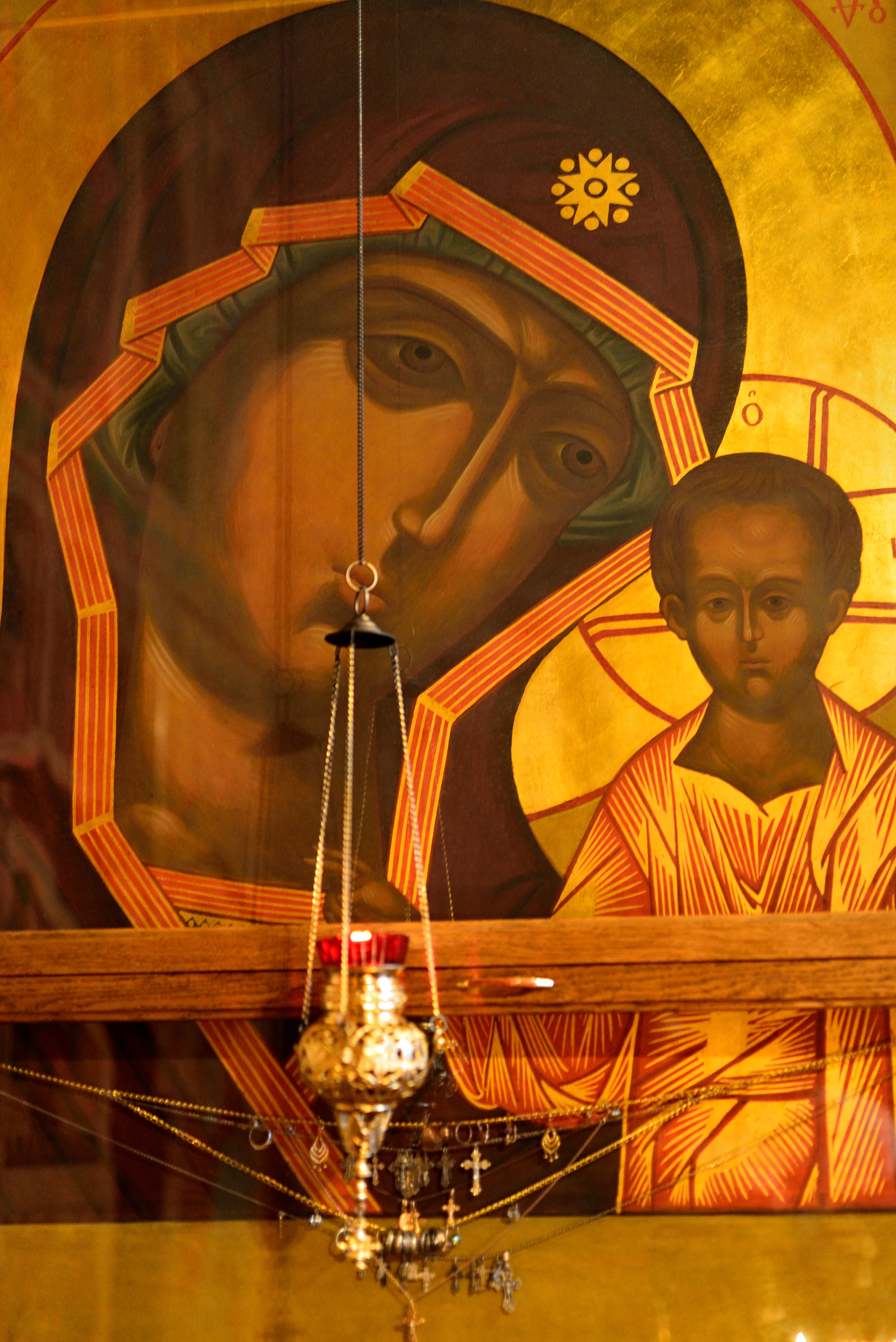
Icon of Kazan mother of God chapel of the same name

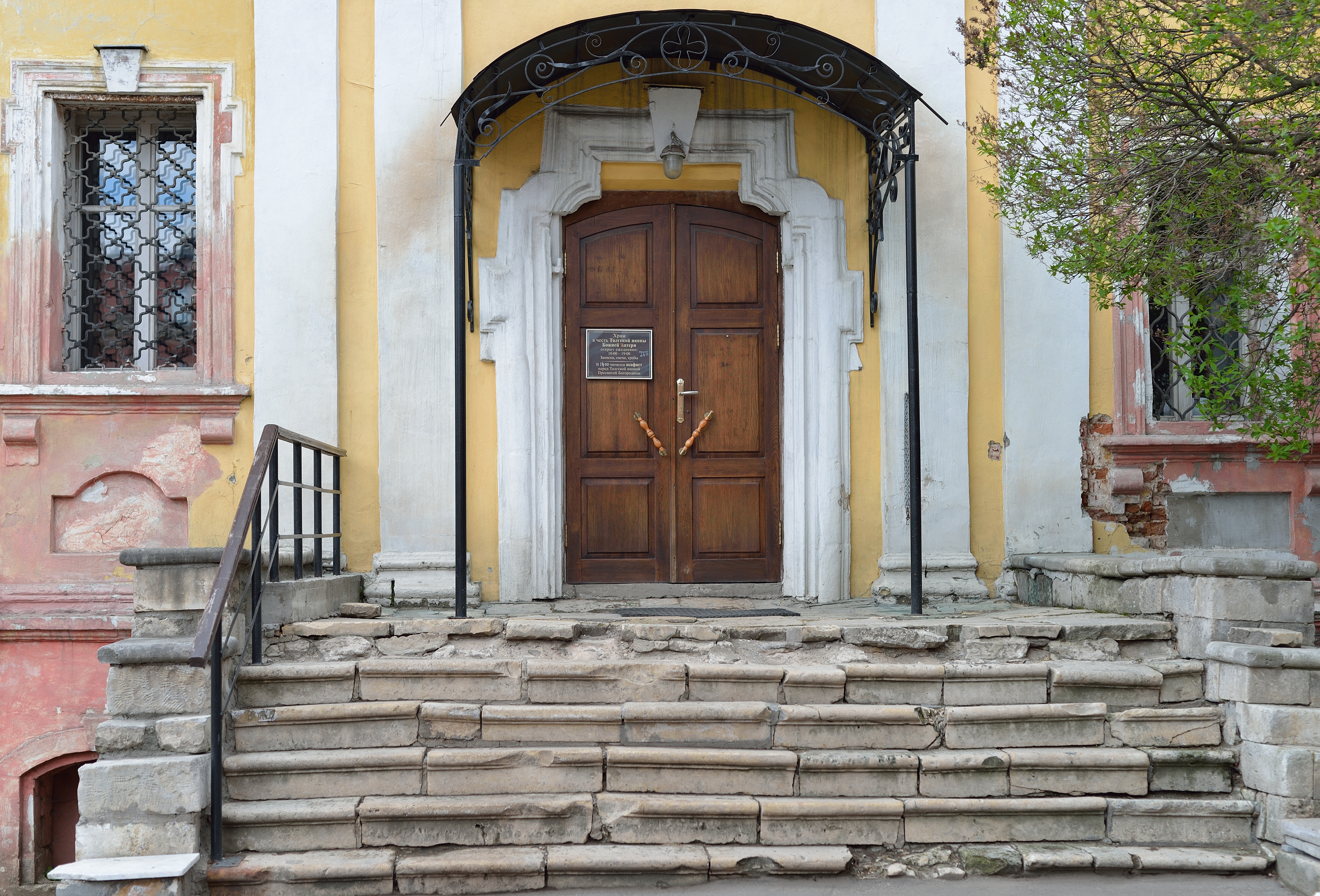
The entrance to the Church of the Tolga icon of the Mother of God

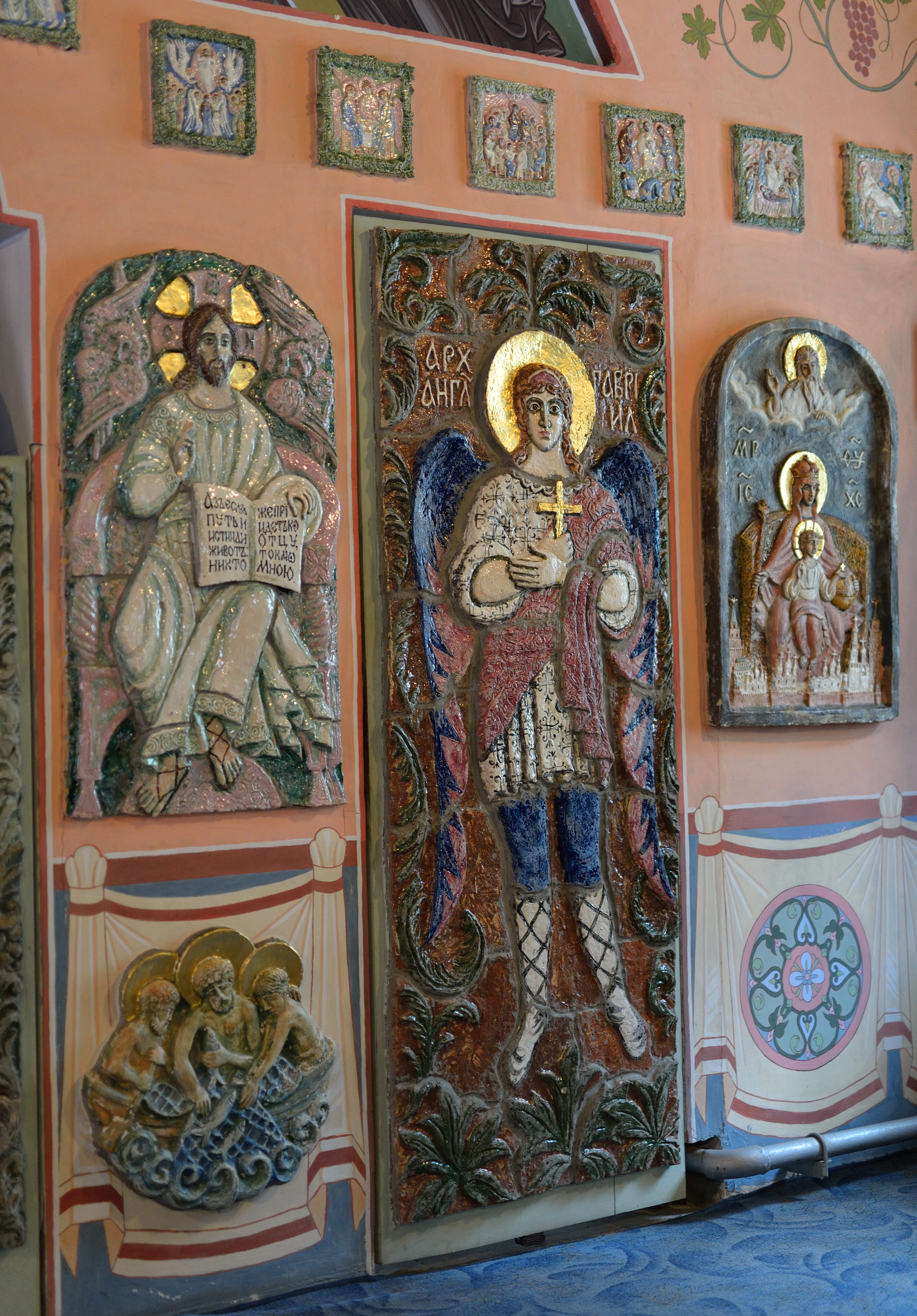
A portion of the ceramic iconostasis of the Church of the Tolga icon of the Mother of God
