= Tented roof =

Type of polygonal hipped roof with steeply pitched slopes rising to a peak

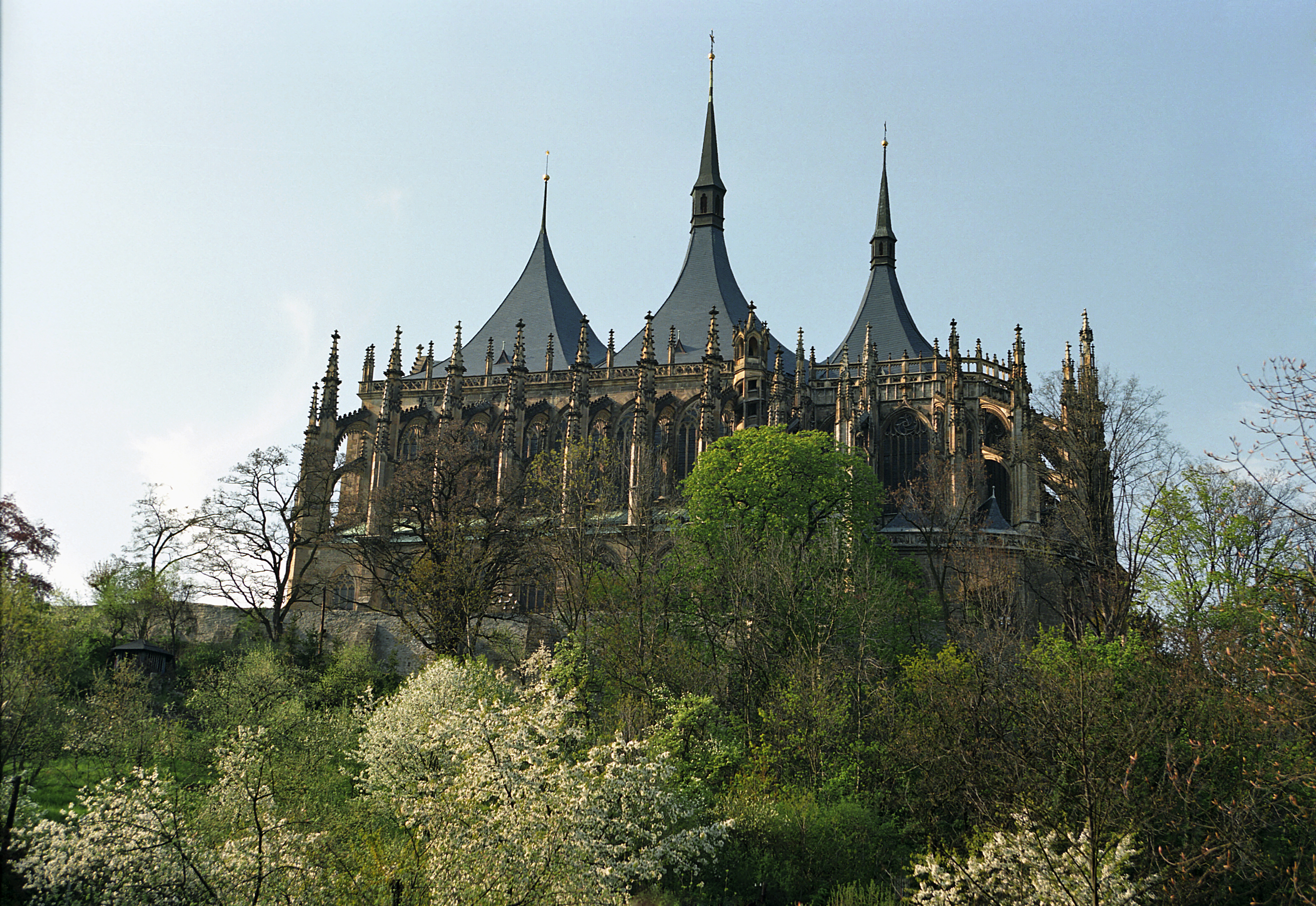
Tent roofs atop St. Barbara's Church, Kutná Hora, Czech Republic

A tented roof (also known as a pavilion roof) is a type of polygonal hipped roof with steeply pitched slopes rising to a peak. Tented roofs, a hallmark of medieval religious architecture, were widely used to cover churches with steep, conical roof structures.

In the Queen Anne Victorian style, it took the form of a wooden turret with an octagonal base with steeply pitched slopes rising to a peak, usually topped with a finial. A distinctive local adaptation of this roof style was widely used in 16th- and 17th-century Russian architecture for churches, although there are examples of this style also in other parts of Europe. It took the form of a polygonal spire but differed in purpose in that it was typically used to roof the main internal space of a church, rather than as an auxiliary structure. The same architectural form is also applied to bell towers.

The term "tent roof" may also be applied in modern architecture to membrane and thin shell structures comprising roofs of modern materials and actual tents.

== Russian tent-like churches ==
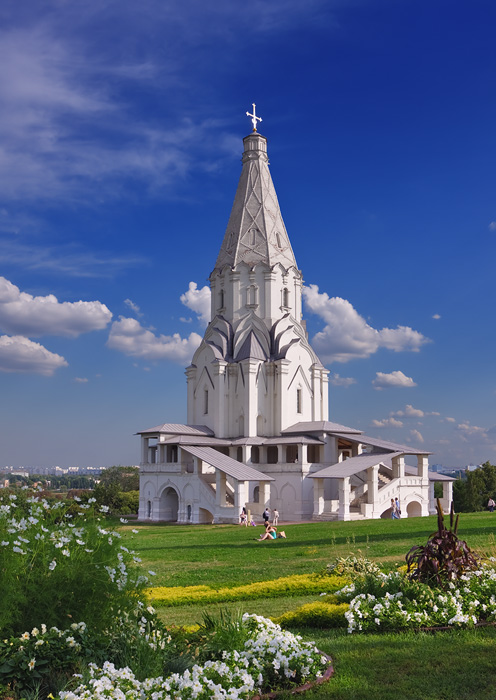
The Church of Ascension in Kolomenskoye is usually considered the earliest stone church with a tented roof. As such it is listed among the UNESCO World Heritage sites.

The "tent-like church" (Russian: шатровая церковь) is a national type of church that was developed in late medieval Russia. It marks a sharp departure from the traditions of Byzantine architecture which never put emphasis on verticality. Sergey Zagraevsky has argued that tented roofs have something in common with European Gothic spires. This architectural development has been described as a Russian parallel to the Gothic architecture of Western Europe. In this local adaptation of the tent roof it took the form of either:

- a polygonal roof made of wood, where wood logs are laid both parallel to the sides of the roof, and across the corners to form squinches, which makes the roof high and rather pointed.
- a roof of similar shape (thin, pointed, nearly conical), made of brick or stone. The lower sections of such a roof are usually constructed of a series of roofed small dormers with gables of semi-circular or onion shape.

Tented roofs are thought to have originated in the Russian North, as they prevented snow from piling up on wooden buildings during long winters. In wooden churches (even modern ones) this type of roof is still very popular. The earliest specimen of such a church was recently transported to an abbey in Vologda. Another notable example is an 18th-century church in Kondopoga, Karelia.

The Ascension church of Kolomenskoye, built in 1532 to commemorate the birth of the first Russian tsar, Ivan IV, is often considered to be the first tented roof church built in stone. However, Zagraevsky has argued that the earliest use of the stone tented roof was in the Trinity Church in Alexandrov, built in the 1510s.

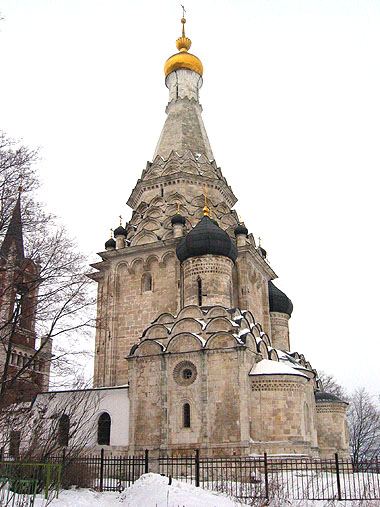
The rocket-like church at Ostrov near Moscow is considered typical for Boris Godunov's reign.

Tented roof design has been prone to most unusual interpretations. Some scholars, for example, view hipped roofs of this variety as phallic symbols. However, it is more likely that this type of design symbolised high ambitions of the nascent unified Russian state and the liberation of Russian art from Byzantine canons after the fall of Constantinople to the Ottoman Empire.

Tented churches were exceedingly popular during the reign of Ivan the Terrible. Two prime examples dating from his reign employ several tents of exotic shapes and colours arranged in a complicated design. These are the Church of St. John the Baptist in Kolomenskoye (1547) and Saint Basil's Cathedral on the Red Square (1561). The latter church unites nine hipped roofs in a striking circular composition.

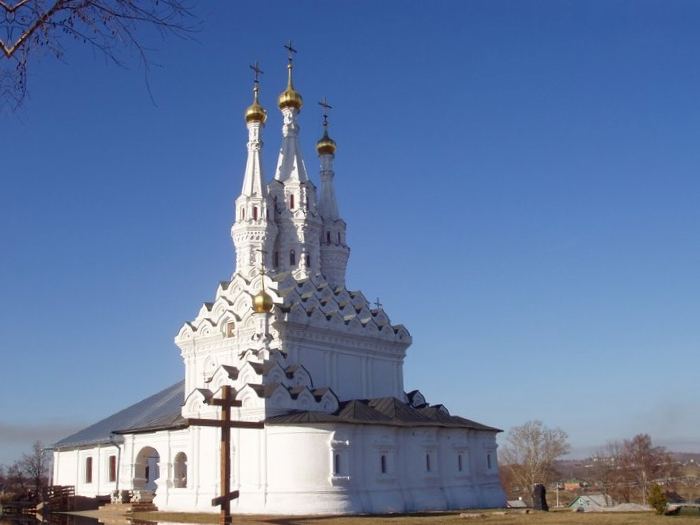
Hodegetria church in Vyazma is one of three major churches with three tents placed in a row.

In the 17th century, tented roofs were placed in a row, sometimes producing astonishing decorative effects. The first instance of this type is the Marvellous Church in Uglich, whose three graceful tents remind one of three burning candles. They also became a typical architectural solution for church bell towers. In the Nativity Church at Putinki, in Moscow, this trend was pushed to its limit, as there are five major and three minor tents used in the construction.

It is said that Patriarch Nikon, who often passed near Putinki church on his way to the Trinity, considered the monument to be in violation of canonical rules of Byzantine architecture and proscribed building tented churches altogether. During his time at office, many beautiful tented churches were demolished, notably the ones in Staritsa and the Moscow Kremlin. Only in the late 19th century was the ban lifted, and the tented roof design was revived in such remarkable monuments as the Church of the Savior on Blood in Saint Petersburg and St. Peter and Paul's Cathedral in Peterhof.

== Gallery ==
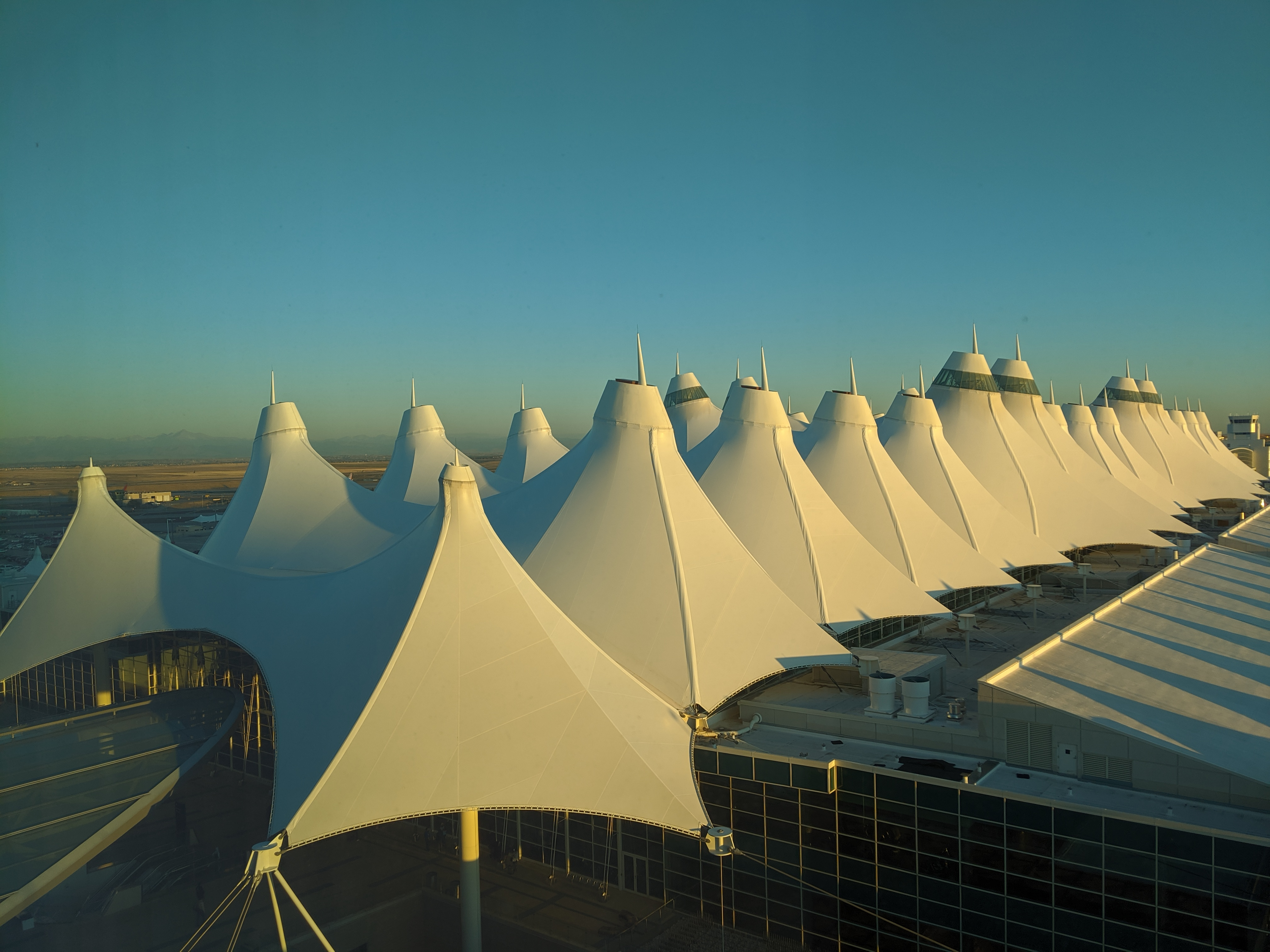
Modern tent roofs at the Denver International Airport using suspended structural membranes.

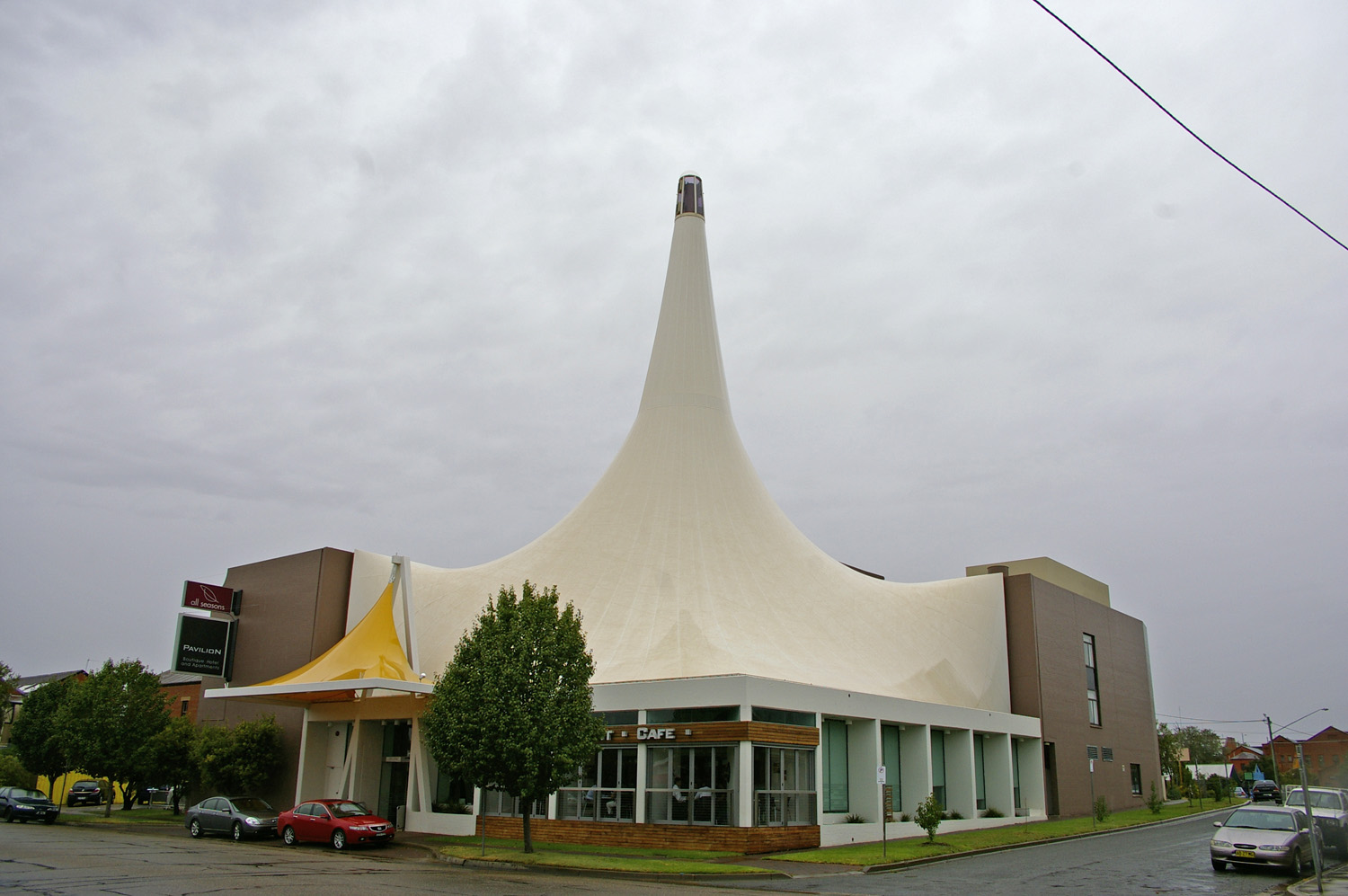
A modern tent roof on the Pavilion Hotel in Wagga Wagga, Australia

== See also ==
- List of roof shapes
