= Nativity Church at Putinki =

Church building in Moscow, Russia

Coordinates: 55°46′01″N 37°36′24″E

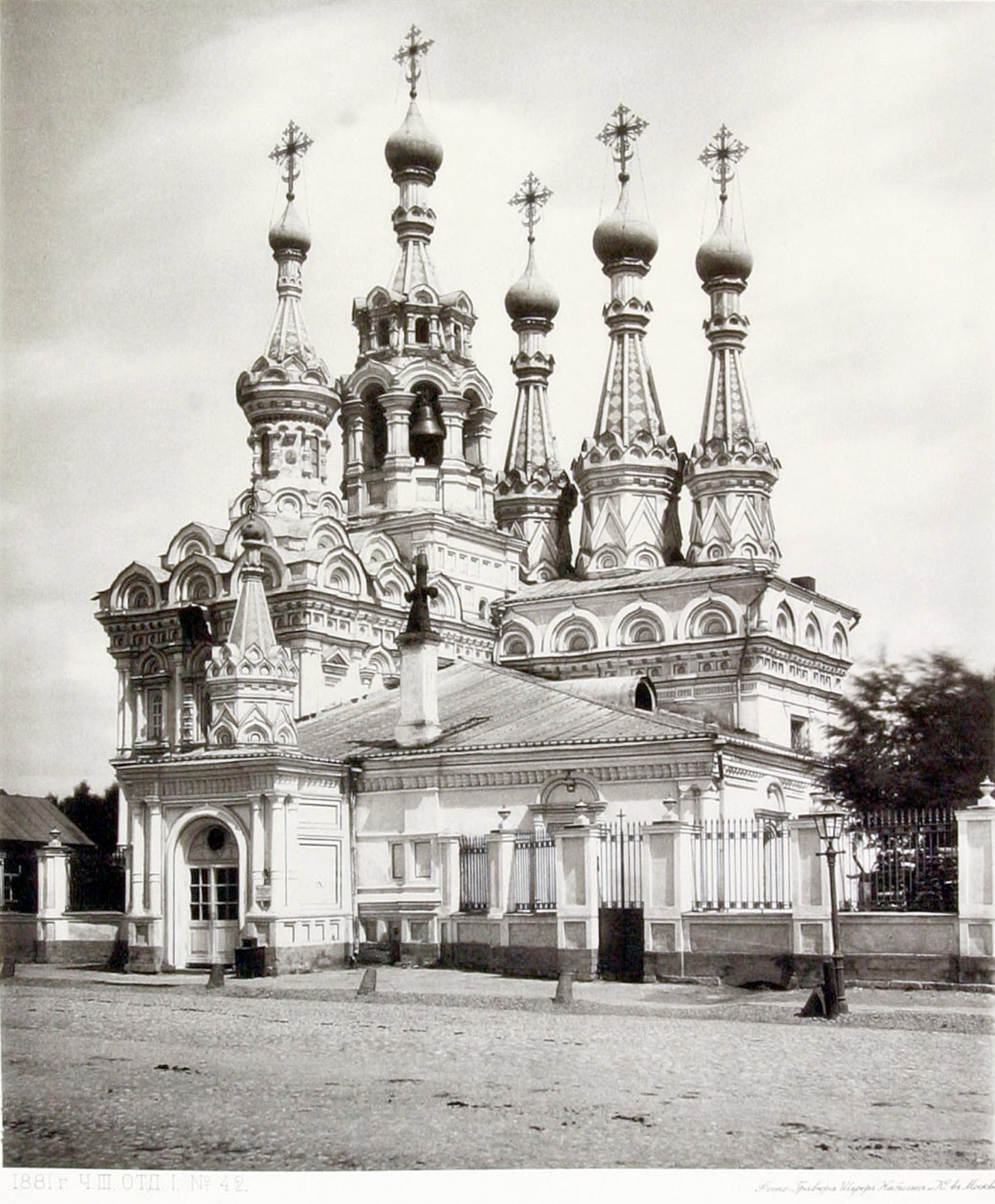
An 1882 photo of the church.

The Church of the Nativity of the Theotokos at Putinki is one of the most picturesque churches in Moscow and the last major tent-like church in the history of Russian architecture. The snow-white church with its multiple tents and azure-and-gold domes resembles a daintily carved piece of ivory.

The Nativity church at Putinki consists of six exquisite tented roofs arranged in a highly unusual composition. Three candle-like tents, placed in a row, crown the church, while its refectory is surmounted by several rows of corbel arches and the fourth tent. The fifth tent is a belltower placed between the church and refectory. The porch also terminates in a pyramidal roof.

The church was commissioned by Tsar Alexis Mikhailovich in 1649 in order to grace a highway leading from Moscow to the Trinity Monastery. Construction works were completed within three years. As the story goes, Patriarch Nikon, when passing the church on his way to the Trinity Monastery, was so scandalized by its unorthodox design that he prohibited the construction of tent-like churches altogether.

After the Vysokopetrovsky Monastery was closed down by the Soviet authorities in 1929, Archimandrite Bartholomew Remov arranged for the monks and nuns to continue their monastic life in secret at the Nativity Church, where he was the Rector. The spiritual life of the monastery continued at Putinki until the NKVD was informed and arrested everyone involved in 1935.

The Soviet authorities closed the church in 1938 but they also funded repair works in 1957. Following the collapse of the Soviet Union, the church was reopened as the patriarch's metochion.
