= St. John the Baptist Church, Yaroslavl =

Church in Yaroslavl, Russia

Coordinates: 57°36′38.96″N 39°51′25.26″E

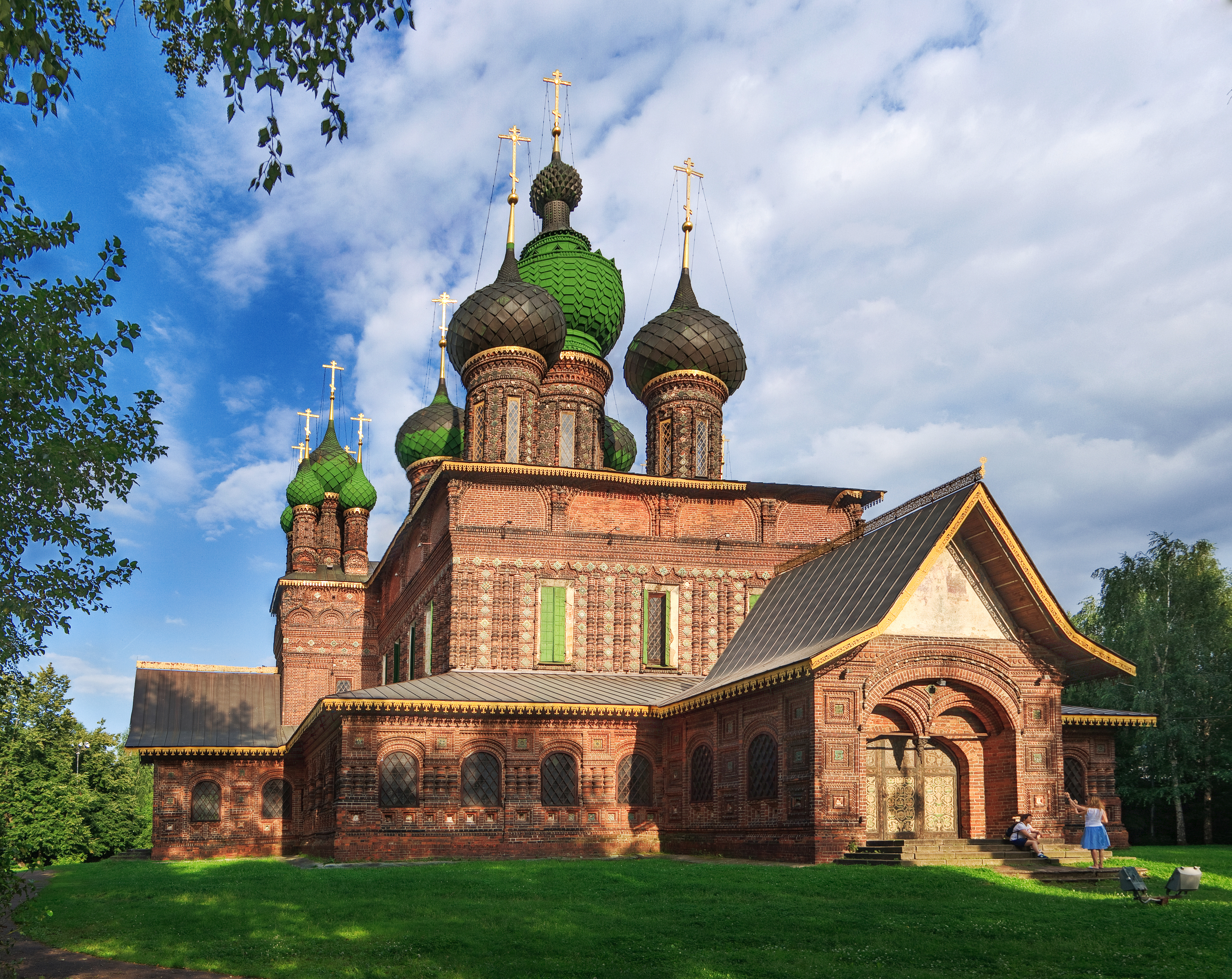
St. John the Baptist Church, Yaroslavl.

St. John the Baptist Church (Russian: Церковь Иоанна Предтечи) in Yaroslavl is considered to be the acme of the Yaroslavl school of architecture. It was built during 1671–1687 on the bank of Kotorosl river in the Tolchkovo sloboda (district) which at that time was the largest and wealthiest part of the town.

Its walls and dome drums are covered with richly glazed tiles; the temple's fifteen onion domes are assembled in three groups. The 7-storey, 45-metre high bell-tower was built later than the church itself in the mid-1690s.

The entire interior is covered with frescoes depicting Christian saints, St. John the Baptist hagiography and biblical topics. They were painted by Dmitry Plekhanov and Fyodor Ignatyev in 1694–1695. In 1911, patrimonial defensor Nicholas Roerich wrote Silent Pogrom about the unskillful restoration of the church after the Russian-Japanese war of 1904–1905.
