= Bartholomew Remov =

Russian Greek-Catholic archbishop (1888–1935)

The Most Reverend Bartholomew Remov
- Titular Bishop of Sergeyev Posad
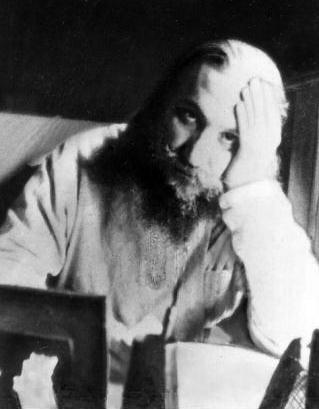
- Remov, c. 1920s
- Church: Russian Greek Catholic Church; Russian Orthodox Church (previous)
- Elected: 25 February 1933
- Quashed: 10 July 1935
- Other post: Auxiliary Bishop of Moscow (1933–1935)
- Previous post: Abbot of the Vysokopetrovsky Monastery (1924–1929)

Orders
- Ordination: 23 June 1911 (deacon); 18 February 1912 (priest) by Fyodor Pozdeyevsky
- Consecration: 10 August 1921 by Patriarch Tikhon

Personal details
- Born: Russian: Николай Фёдорович Ремов, romanized: Nikolai Fedorovich Remov; 3 October 1888 Moscow, Russian Empire
- Died: 26 June 1935 (aged 46) Butyrka Prison, Moscow, Soviet Union
- Denomination: Eastern Catholicism; Eastern Orthodoxy (previous)
- Parents: Fyodor Remov (father)

Bartholomew Remov (Russian: Варфоломе́й Ре́мов, lit. 'Varfolomey Remov'; 3 October 1888 – 26 June 1935), born Nikolai Fyodorovich Remov (Russian: Никола́й Фёдорович Ре́мов), was a Russian Orthodox monk and archbishop who secretly entered the Russian Greek Catholic Church in 1932. He was sentenced to death in 1935 by the Military Collegium of the Supreme Court of the Soviet Union on charges of anti-Soviet agitation and espionage on behalf of the Holy See and executed soon after.

== Early life ==
Nikolai Remov was born on 3 October 1888 in Moscow in the family of a married Russian Orthodox priest. After he was born, his father Fyodor and their family was visited by John of Kronstadt, who said that Nikolai would be a "confessor of the Church and great man of prayer." He had several siblings, some of whom died of illnesses at a young age, which had an impact on Nikolai and influenced his later decision to become a monk. He attended the Zaikonospassky Theological School and the Moscow Theological Seminary.

== Orthodox Church ==
Remov became a student at the Moscow Theological Academy in 1908, and during his time there, on 10 June 1911 he was tonsured as a monk by the abbot of a monastery. On 23 June 1911, he was ordained as a hierodeacon (deacon-monk) by Bishop Fyodor Pozdeyevsky, and was ordained as a hieromonk (priest-monk) on 18 February 1912. When Remov became a monk, he took the name Varfolomey (Bartholomew) as his religious name, after Bartholomew the Apostle. He graduated from the Moscow Theological Academy in 1912 with a master's degree in theology, and in 1916 became an associate professor in the Holy Scriptures department of the Academy.

His master's degree thesis, "The Book of the Prophet Avvakum: Introduction and Interpretation", is based on a detailed analysis of the Greek and Hebrew texts of Habakkuk, complemented with the Slavic manuscripts. The work shows the deep erudition and a multifaceted approach to the subject. The author focused on textual criticism and the historical interpretation of the book of Habakkuk.

Beyond his work as a historian and biblical scholar, Remov was known as an expert on Divine Liturgy and the Old Church Slavonic language. In later years, Remov's knowledge of Old Church Slavonic, the liturgical language of his Church, caused him to be ordered to audit all church services, in particular, to listen in on the choir and hymns of the Moscow Patriarchate.

In 1913, Remov was appointed as the Protopope of the Theological Academy's Church of the Intercession, and in 1914, he became an associate professor of Old Testament studies. In 1919, he became the pastor of the Theological Academy's Church of the Protection and was raised to the rank of Archimandrite. In 1920, the Patriarch Tikhon of Moscow appointed Remov the director of the Higher Institute of Theology.

On September 6, 1920, Remov was arrested for preaching against the Bolshevik seizure and confiscation of the relics of St. Sergius of Radonezh. The GPU's Remov Case file alleges, as the Soviet secret police often did of Orthodox clergy who supported Patriarch Tikhon against the Pro-Soviet Renovationist schism, that Archimandrite Bartholomew was, "a prominent and active member of the militant Black Hundreds clergy". The secret police also chose to interpret Archimandrite Bartholomew's sermon calling for defense of St. Sergei's relics against desecration as "calling for a pogrom and, as a consequence, inciting the ignorant masses."

Under interrogation, however, Archimandrite Bartholomew said, "The truth of Christ, as I understand it and accept it, is dearer to me than life. I have never called for any kind of violence and would consider such a call dishonorable."

He was released on 28 February 1921, "in view of the poor state of his health." Archimandrite Bartholomew was carried away from the prison on a stretcher.

=== Orthodox Bishop ===
On 28 July 1921, the bishop of Sergiev Posad Vicariate of the Moscow Diocese, appointed Remov to a position at the Trinity Sergius Lavra. He served in that position from 1921 to 1923 and became the Archimandrite of the Vysokopetrovsky Monastery in Moscow. From 1925 to 1935, he was also the Pastor of the Church of the Nativity of the Virgin at Putinki.

Although Remov at first supported the Deputy Patriarchal Locum Tenens Metropolitan Metropolitan Sergei's 1927 declaration of loyalty to the Soviet State, according to historian Irina Osipova, Metropolitan Bartholomew, "could not accept the harsh policy which Sergei adopted after the schism that divided the clergy in two camps. Bartholomew was disturbed by threats to visit punishment on every 'insubordinate' priest and by the mass arrests and sentencing of these recalcitrants."

Two fellow members of the Orthodox Hierarchy later signed depositions admitting, in the words of the Soviet secret police, to having, "participated in illegal gatherings at Archbishop Bartholomew's apartment." Both Hierarchs admitted that those at the gatherings had discussed at length Metropolitan Sergei's use of coercion and his alliance with the Soviet secret police to enforce his policy of subservience to the State and to have all agreed that, "the line pursued by Metropolitan Sergei is fatal for the Church."

In 1928, Remov was arrested and charged with "harbouring a spy", whom in Bartholomew's opinion, was simply a fellow religious believer. He was released, however, without charge.

On 9 June 1934, Remov was elevated to the rank of archbishop.

In 1928, Remov began meeting with Pie Eugène Neveu, A.A., formerly the parish priest of the mining town of Makiivka, Ukraine, who had been secretly consecrated as a Bishop by Michel d'Herbigny in 1926 and installed in the Church of St. Louis des Français as the secret Apostolic Administrator for the Catholic Church in Moscow Oblast. Over the years that followed, Remov and Neveu stayed in contact. Remov later recalled, "I got to know Neveu in Moscow through the engineer Rumyantsev, Alexander Alexandrovich. Rumyantsev was fascinated by the idea of uniting the Orthodox and Catholic Churches."

After the Vysokopetrovsky Monastery was closed down by the Soviet authorities in 1929, Remov arranged for the monastery to continue in secret at the Nativity Church at Putinki.

One secret monastic later recalled, "The institution of the novitiate was created in our society as a means of inducing staunch Christians who would replenish the declining monastic cadres and, if necessary, suffer for the Faith."

To protect secret monks and nuns from arrest by the Soviet secret police, Archbishop Bartholomew decreed, "All those initiated into monasticism should continue to live and work as before in their institutions and enterprises, avoiding any outward change in their lifestyle, and concealing their monastic commitment from others."

As a further protection from arrest, Archbishop Bartholomew ordered the monastery's Archimandrites to refer to each monk and nun by a false name on the lists presented to the Diocesan Council.

Meanwhile, his secret meetings continued with Bishop Neveu.

In a letter from 1931, Bishop Neveu doubted whether Bishop Bartholomew would ever become a Catholic since he "limited himself to vague words about his sympathies and was too afraid of compromising himself".

=== Secret conversion ===
According to Remov, however, "By 1932, our relationship was friendly and we had begun to meet regularly. In 1932, prompted by Neveu, I secretly entered the Catholic Church."

On August 10, 1932, Remov wrote a letter to Pope Pius XI, "Monsignor... In humility and gratitude I fall at the feet of the most Holy Father. I rejoice in expressing to you, Monsignor, my profound thanks. It is wonderful to know that one is engaged in God's work, to 'labor all the day long', and I would like to repeat, together with you, the words of the Archangel, 'For Thee, nothing is impossible.'"

On February 25, 1933, the Vatican released an official document signed by Bishop Michel d'Herbigny, which established the titular diocese of Sergiyev Posad for the Russian Greek Catholic Church and appointed Remov, "already possessing the rank of Archbishop in the Eastern Rite", as the titular bishop. A second document, dated July 3, 1933, appointed Remov as suffragan Apostolic Administrator in Moscow for Catholics of the Eastern Rite. Remov later admitted to NKVD interrogators that Bishop Neveu had shown him both documents, but chose not to give them to Remov, "for fear that [they] might be discovered in a possible search."

D'Herbigny gave his support to Bishop Bartholomew, the first such convert from Episcopal rank in 20th century Russia, and considered the secret Catholic bishop as a potential future Patriarch of the Russian Greek Catholic Church.

Some have believed Bishop Bartholomew's conversion to Catholicism to have been a lie by the Soviet State. They seriously considered the possibility of his identity as a martyr and one of the Orthodox saints during the Soviet persecution of the Church. They believed that his meetings with Bishop Neveu did not go beyond consultation and the transfer of information about the religious persecution of the Orthodox Church. In their view, the interrogations was forged by employees of the NKVD and the documents that came from d'Herbigny are forgeries as well. However, their arguments are now rejected by both Orthodox and Catholic scholars. The General Archive of the Augustinians in Rome preserved the correspondence between Metropolitan Bartholomew and Bishop Neveu, which proves his passionate belief in the Russian Greek Catholic Church. They also reveal, according to Irina Osipova, that Archbishop Bartholomew viewed Bishop Neveu as his spiritual mentor.

== Final arrest and death ==
In the fall of 1934, the NKVD arrested Pavel Velikanov, the organiser of a sect called "The Fourth International of Spirit and Truth". Under interrogation, Velikanov revealed that an illegal Orthodox convent and monastery existed at the Church of the Nativity of the Virgin at Putinki. Velikanov also provided a long list of the priests, monks, and nuns who were involved. The first arrests connected with the NKVD's investigation took place on January 28, 1935 and those who were arrested named Archbishop Bartholomew as the spiritual leader of the secret monastery and convent.

On February 18, 1935, the NKVD received a letter from certain Putinki parishioners, who alleged, "It would appear that the closure of the monastery has not eliminated the monastic spirit, which has recently begun to manifest itself with particular intensity. The churches are flooded with women in black headscarves and black dress (the so-called hysterics) in numbers so great that they are able to perform any role desired of them, but also to dominate the congregations; this is, in the end, transforming us from a parish church into a monastery."

Along with 21 others, Remov was arrested again on 21 February 1935 and was accused of being, "a member of the Catholic group of a counterrevolutionary organization attached to the illegal Petrovsky Monastery" and of anti-Soviet agitation.

In a signed confession, Remov admitted, "I frequently passed to Neveu letters from exiled clergymen. Neveu forwarded these letters to the Vatican as proof of the persecution of religious believers by the Soviet authorities. I told Neveu that all the actions of Metropolitan Sergei were planned in collaboration with the organs of State Power."

After a brief detention period in the Butyrka Prison, where he was sent shortly after his arrest, Remov was further charged with, "betrayal of the Motherland and espionage on behalf of the Vatican."

On June 17, 1935, a closed session of the Military Collegium of the Supreme Court of the Soviet Union sentenced Remov, "to the supreme penalty, death by shooting, with confiscation of property. The sentence is final and no appeal is allowed."

Metropolitan Bartholomew Remov was executed soon after, on 10 July 1935. In a letter to d'Herbigny, Bishop Neveu wrote that "to the end he remained faithful to the Catholic Church and to the Holy Father, whom he loved and whose commands he was ready to fulfill at any cost."

== See also ==
- Leonid Feodorov

== Sources ==
- The Catholic Revival
- http://vselenskiy.narod.ru/remow.htm
- https://books.google.com/books?id=HnUnJ7X10BMC&dq=bartholomew+remov&pg=PA168

Eastern Orthodox Church titles
Preceded by Pankraty Gladkov	Abbot of the Vysokopetrovsky Monastery; 1924–1929	Vacant
Catholic Church titles
Titles established	Auxiliary Bishop of Moscow; 1933–1935	Vacant
Titles established	Titular Bishop of Sergeyev Posad; 1933–1935	Vacant
