= Architecture of Russia =

The architecture of Russia refers to the architecture of modern Russia as well as historical states, including Kievan Rus', the Russian principalities, the Tsardom of Russia, and the Russian Empire.

The vernacular architecture stems from wooden construction traditions, and monumental masonry construction started to appear during the Kievan period. After the Mongol invasions, the Russian architectural trajectory continued in succeeding feudal Russian states, including Novgorod, Vladimir-Suzdal, Pskov, and Moscow, until they were united into a centralized state at the dawn of the modern era.

Much of the early standing architectural tradition in Russia stems from foreign influences and styles. Among the characteristic styles present in Russian architecture are the Byzantine revival style of Kievan Rus' and succeeding principalities' churches, the Muscovite style, baroque, neoclassical, eclecticism, art nouveau, as well as the signature styles of the Soviet period.

== Pre-Christian architecture ==
Russian architecture is a mix of eastern Roman and pagan architecture. Some characteristics taken from the Slavic pagan temples are the exterior galleries and the plurality of towers.

== Early Medieval architecture ==
=== Kiev ===
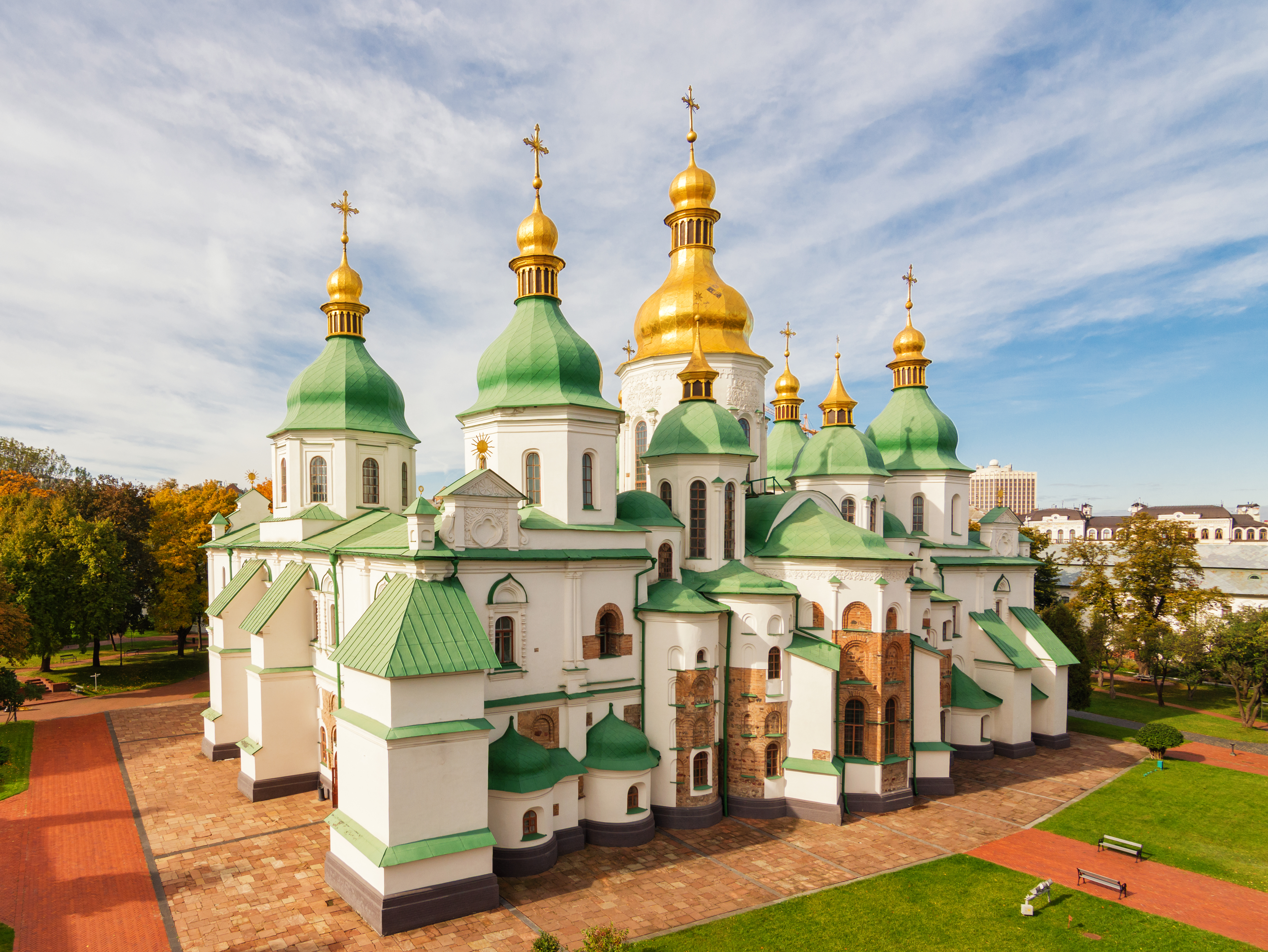
Cathedral of St. Sophia, Kyiv

Under the reign of Vladimir the Great in 988 AD, Kievan Rus' converted toChristianity from their previous pagan religions, and the monumental architecture that followed was mainly ecclesiastical in type. According to legend, the conversion to Orthodox Christianity rather than to another religion was due to the beauty of the Hagia Sophia in Constantinople. The architecture style that dominated in this time blended Slavic and Byzantine styles, with predominant churches built in brick and stone with Byzantine art forms, initially built by imported Greek and Byzantine masters but adopted by local craftsmen and slightly modified. Findings from twentieth-century excavations on the Church of the Tithe, the foundations of the original plan of the church shows evidence of a Byzantine "inscribed cross" plan. This inscribed cross typology borrowed from Byzantine architecture served as the main prototype for the pan of these Kievan masonry churches. As the Byzantine prototype was adapted, it began to take its own style. Differing from the Byzantine churches they were based on, the masonry churches in Kievan Rus' had more pronounced silhouettes, were bulkier, and had smaller windows, providing a more mysterious interior.

Large-scale architectural work paused after the death of Vladimir, but resumed c. 1030 under Yaroslav. Under his reign, the cathedral dedicated to St. Sophia, also known as the cathedral of Hagia Sofia, in which the Metropolitan was to be seated for the following 200 years. Excavations have found that the original plan of the church also prescribed to the inscribed-cross typology (the church has been extensively modified since its construction due to it falling into ruin during Mongol rule). A multitude of domes is also present in the church, although it is not clear its stylistic origins (while wooden churches have complex roof designs, a clear derivation has not been established). Inside the church, several of the medieval Kievan mosaics created by Greek masters survive and show a provincial Byzantine style. The construction of the church itself is a form of stone and brick masonry called opus mixtum, which means alternating rows of stone and flat brick, or plinthos, meaning crushed brick in lime mortar. The exterior was not as ornate as the interior, relying instead on the mass of the building and sported a pink colour, later covered up with white stucco. It is, however, the only structure from this period that mostly maintains its original interior, and thus can be used as an example for the interiors of these early Kievan churches.

Meanwhile, in other urban centers, masonry church construction also started to appear. As monastery's and urban center's wealth increased, wooden churches started to be replaced by masonry ones. As more churches were constructed, slight modifications were made to the base inscribed cross typology, as well as created a greater emphasis on verticality. Due to the scale of the churches being constructed, interior mosaics and frescos continued being made by imported Byzantine and Greek masters rather than local craftsmen, and thus continued using the Byzantine style. Local contribution to construction, however, meant that modifications were still made, resulting in the style of ecclesiastical architecture in Kievan Rus' which drew from influences from Bulgaria, Georgia, and Armenia for these modifications to the Byzantine prototype.

Many of these churches suffered severe neglect following Mongol invasion, and thus were largely modified in the centuries following.

=== Novgorod Land ===
Following the conversion of the Kievan Rus' to Christianity under Vladimir's reign, Bishop Joachim of Kherson commissioned Novgorod's first masonry Church (not extant) as well as the original wooden church of St. Sophia. The Byzantine style of churches, which was imported from Kiev, was adapted to a distinctive Novgorodian style through the ecclesiastical constructions commissioned by the princes in the eleventh and twelfth centuries.

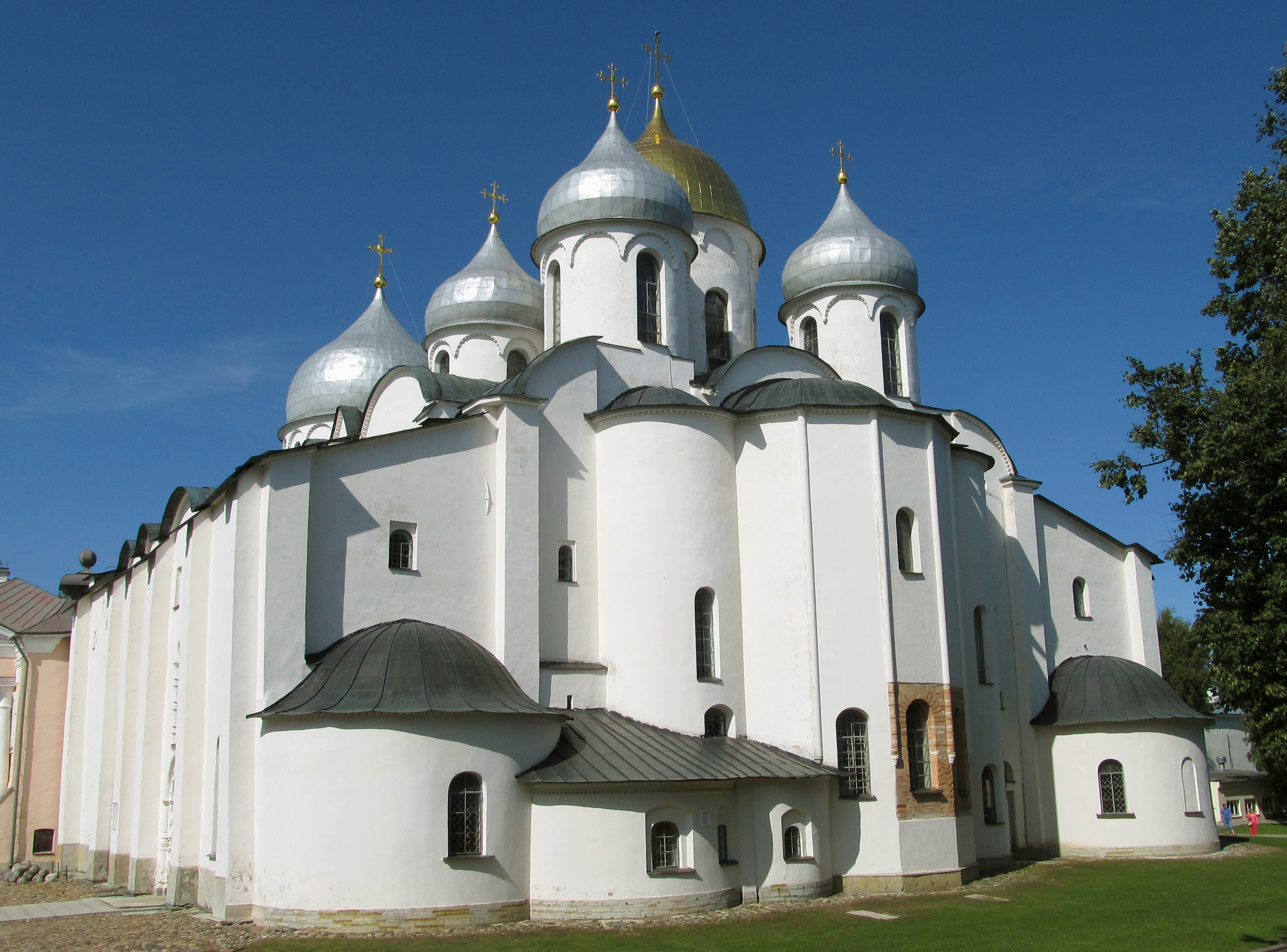
St. Sophia Cathedral in Novgorod

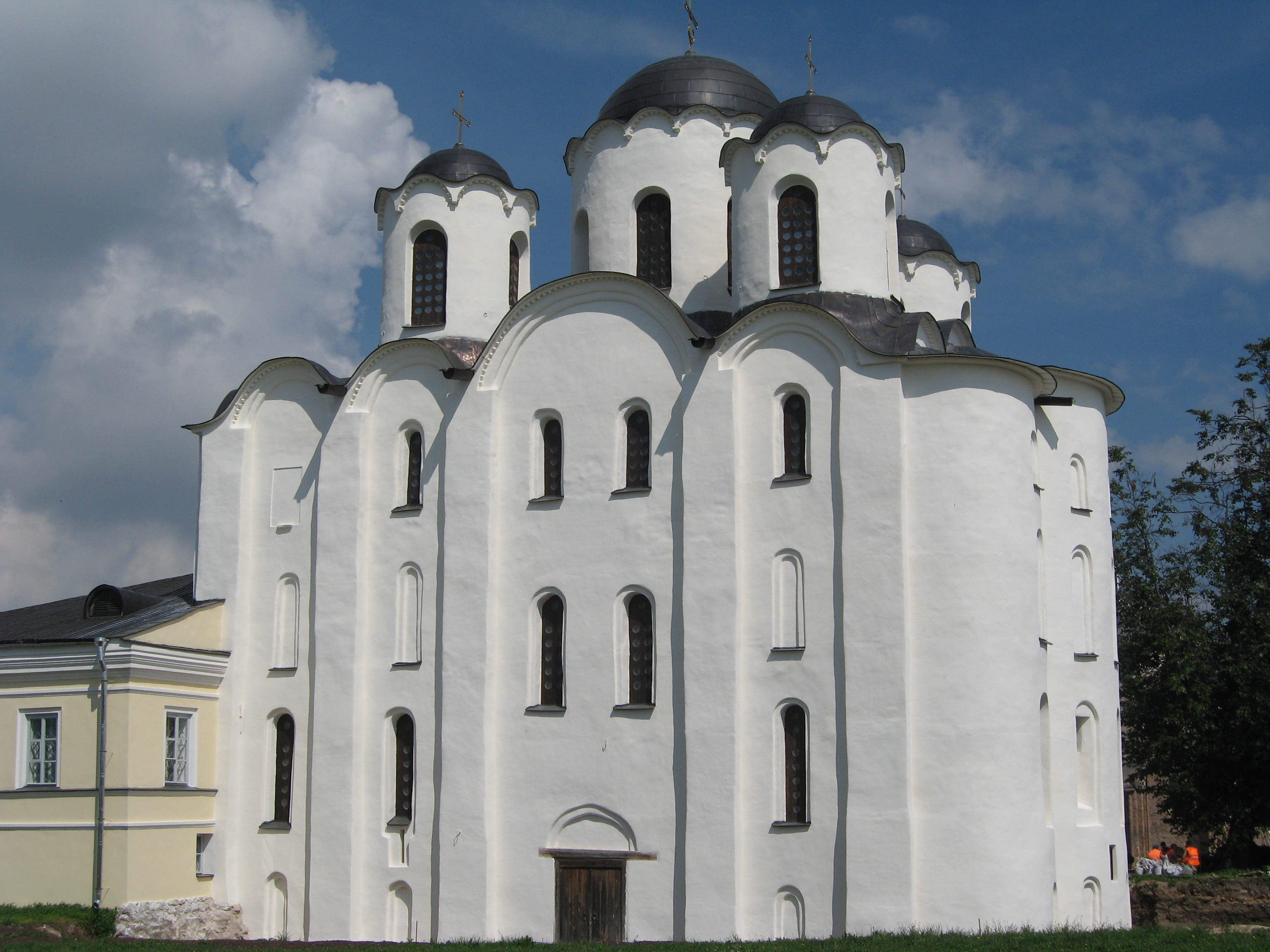
St. Nicolas Cathedral in Novgorod

Sts. Peter and Paul Church in Novgorod

Dormition Cathedral in Staraya Ladoga

St. George's Church in Staraya Ladoga

Novgorod's medieval architecture owes its distinctive style to the adaptation of Byzantine and Kievan styles to its local conditions. As there was not a nearby source of surface stone and its brickmaking capabilities was limited in the area, construction of Novgorodian masonry churches were made using a method of masonry using rough-hewn local stone such as limestone with a crushed brick and lime cement, resulting in a pink surface similar to that used in contemporary Kievan churches but with a coarser surface texture. Unlike the cathedral in Kiev, the Novgorodian St Sophia only has five main domes rather than 13 like in Kiev (representing Christ and the twelve apostles). While the churches constructed in the twelfth century didn't rival the Cathedral of St Sophia in scale or complexity, the princes continued their show of power in their architectural projects.

The Cathedral of St. George of Yuriev Monastery was commissioned in 1119 by Prince Vsevolod of Pskov and is another example of one of these princely churches. The architect was known as Master Peter, one of the few architects who have been recorded at this time in Russia. The exterior is characterized by narrow windows and double-recessed niches, which proceed in a rhythm across the façade; the interior walls reach a height of 20 metres (66 ft). Its pillars are closely spaced, emphasizing the height of the vaulted ceilings. The interior was covered in frescoes from the prince's workshops, including some of the rarest Russian paintings of the time.

Three more churches show the style of the princely churches created during this time: the Cathedral of St. Nicholas in Yaroslav's Court (1113), the Church of the Nativity of the Virgin at Antoniev Monastery (1117–1119), and the Church of John the Baptist in Petriatin Courty (1127–1130). Several characteristics are present in the churches, and they draw a more simplistic form of that of the Cathedral of St Sophia.

After the Mongols invaded, Novgorod suffered less than its counterpart Kiev. Construction of masonry churches, however, stalled for several years. After relations with the new Mongol overlords stabilized in the mid to late fourteenth century, there was a revival in architectural style and innovation in Novgorod and a resurgence in masonry church construction. The first of these churches was the Church of St Nicholas at Lipno (1292), located in the southeast of Novgorod. While small in size (10mx10m) it had several features which were novel and used in the masonry churches constructed after. The church was badly damaged during World War II. The following churches of Novgorod (such as the Church of the Transfiguration on Ilyina Street, built in 1374), are steep-roofed and roughly carved; and several contain medieval frescoes.

=== Pskov Land ===
St. John the Baptist Cathedral in Pskov

Pskov, while being less prosperous than Novgorod, also hosted a revival of masonry church construction in the fifteenth century. Part of this can be attributed to its location in the north, which was not invaded by the Mongols. Pskov also adopted a secular masonry style, although resources were mainly allocated towards ecclesiastical construction. Basic material for construction of these churches was local flagstone, with plinthos brick, and a thin layer of stucco to protect the layers underneath. Both the cement ground and limestone whitewash used in the wall covering contained impurities that would result in the typical light yellow and pink tones of the church exteriors. Few of the churches built in this period still exist, but several developments are present in the ones that remain. One of these include the use of wood planks as the preferred roofing material, which contributed to a typically planar roof structure as opposed to the trefoil type which became commonplace in Novgorod.

After its surrender to Moscow, Pskov fared far better than Novgorod, declaring acceptance of Muscovite rule in 1510.

== Muscovite period ==
=== Origins of Moscow ===
Moscow during the Kievan period is sparse in the historical record, with the first mention of it being in a letter from Yury Dolgoruky to his ally, Prince Sviatoslav Olgovich of Chernigov, in 1147. In 1156, Yury Dolgoruky built a wooden fortification on an earthen rampart protecting a cluster of workshops and trading rows. The Kremlin currently stands in place of these original fortifications, and a department store in the location of these original buildings. Following this construction, there are few references to Moscow. In 1176 there is a chronicle that notes that the town was burned during a raid by a neighboring principality, and in January 1238 it was overrun by the Mongol armies of Batu on their way to Vladimir. The Mongol's looting of the territory was so thorough, however, that capitals did not have the resources to construct stone churches for decades.

During Mongol rule, Moscow slowly grew. The population increased due to refugee immigration from surrounded, more exposed territories, and collaboration between the Muscovite princes and the Mongol horde meant it was safer than many surrounding capitals. Thus, Moscow grew from being a small town to being a larger capital city with more resources to dedicate towards architectural projects.

=== Muscovite style ===
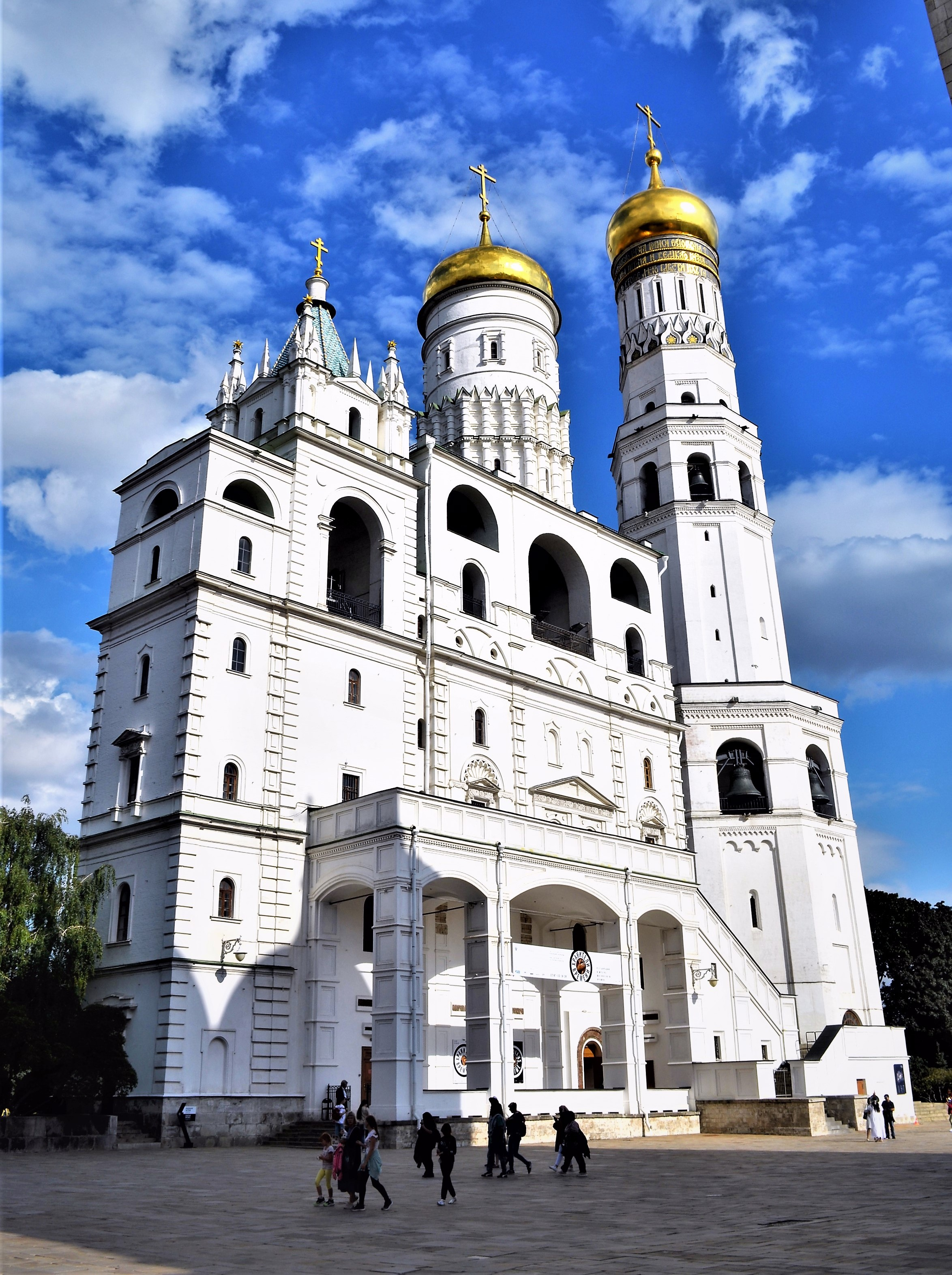
Ivan The Great Bell Tower (1505–1508)

Few examples of early Muscovite stone churches remain in Moscow, and early examples are found more in the surrounding towns. One such place is the small village of Kamenskoe, whose small limestone church is dated to the latter half of the fourteenth century. It is of a simpler style than other churches commissioned in the same period, and has only been partially restored since its construction. The cornice is presumed to have originally culminated in decorative point zakomary. The interior shows features of Balkan architecture, showing a Serbian influence prevalent in Muscovite and the rest of Russian architecture of this period, such as piers attached to interior corners (rather than being free-standing).

Larger examples of these early Muscovite churches appear in Zvenigorod, about 60 km west of Moscow. Records place Zvenigorod under the Muscovite domain in the fourteenth century, and by the end of it Iurii endowed it with a monastery to be under the direction of the monk Savva. It is the Savvino-Storozhevskii Monastery, and the town center was developed alongside its construction. The cathedrals built in this monastery show a depart from the pre-Mongolian stone churches built by Vladimir. It is of a simpler design, with repeating motifs and a departure from the styles of ornamentation. The style is marked by pointed forms (as opposed to zakomary and rounded arches) and a tendency to ornamentalism. The Zvenigorod cathedrals would serve as the prototypes for many of the churches that followed in the fifteenth century.

Muscovite masonry continued to develop in the fifteenth and early sixteenth century, with the production of brick being more apparent in the mid-fifteenth century. In 1474, Ivan III imported builders from Pskov to Moscow (Pskov had been saved from ruin by the Mongol horde, and thus had more advanced construction knowledge than Moscow), and they adapted the stone-slab method of construction from Pskov to the brick masonry of the churches that followed as well as incorporating several features characteristic of churches in Pskov, such as corbel arches, church porches, exterior galleries, and bell towers. The brick construction as well as a new Muscovite tendency towards bold architectural ornament is featured in the Church of the Holy Spirit (1476) which has a frieze created by glazed ceramic tiles, deriving from the ornamental stripes of Novgorod, Pskov, and Suzdalia. Other churches built by the Pskov builders during this period show more influence from Pskov's style, such as ornamental brickwork in the façade of the Church of the Deposition of the Robe (1484–1485). Apart from churches, many other structures date from Ivan III's reign. These include fortifications (Kitai-gorod, the Kremlin (its current towers were built later), Ivangorod), towers (Ivan the Great Bell Tower) and palaces (the Palace of Facets and the Uglich Palace).

In the 16th century, the key development was the introduction of the tented roof in brick architecture. It is believed that this Russian derivation is a continuation of the manner of wood construction being taken in masonry form, and is a form that completely deviates from the accepted Orthodox forms. The first tent-like brick church is the Ascension church in Kolomenskoe (1531), designed to commemorate the birth of Ivan the Terrible. Its design gives rise to speculation; it is likely that this style (never found in other Orthodox countries) symbolized the ambition of the nascent Russian state and the liberation of Russian art from Byzantine canons after the Fall of Constantinople to the Turks. The style of church was also known as “Tower Churches”.

After the Time of Troubles the church and state were bankrupt, unable to finance any construction works; an initiative was taken by rich merchants in Yaroslavl, on the Volga. During the 17th century, they built many large cathedral-type churches with five onion-like domes, surrounding them with tents of bell towers and aisles. At first the churches' composition was sharply asymmetrical, with different parts balancing each other on the "scale-beam" principle (e.g., the Church of Elijah the Prophet, 1647–50). Subsequently, the Yaroslavl churches were strictly symmetrical, with domes taller than the building itself, and amply decorated with polychrome tiles (e.g., the Church of John the Chrysostom on the Volga, 1649–54). A zenith of Volga architecture was reached in the Church of St John the Baptist (built 1671–87) – the largest in Yaroslavl, with 15 domes and more than 500 frescoes. The brick exterior of the church, from the cupolas down to the tall porches, was elaborately carved and decorated with tiles.

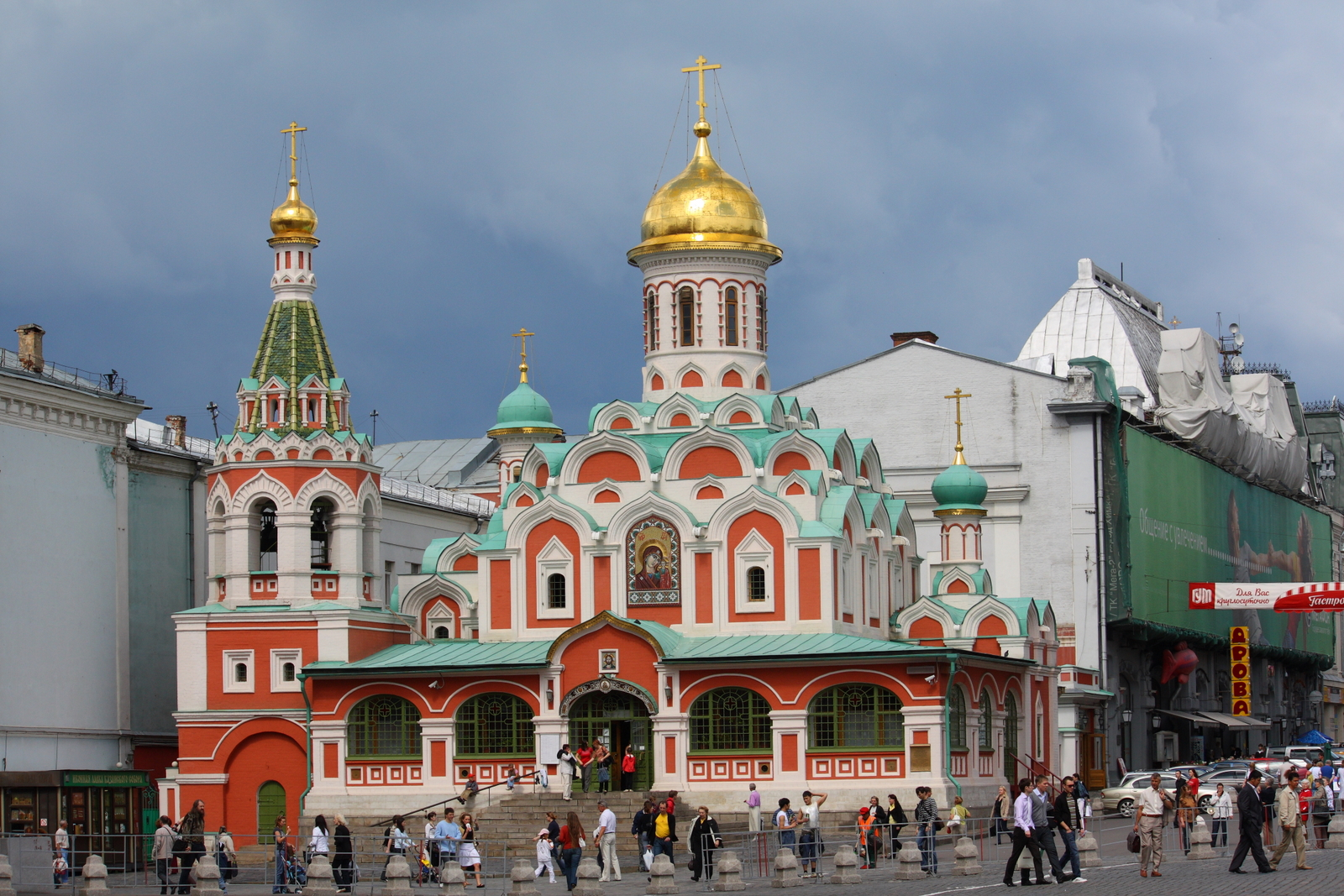
Kazan Cathedral in Red Square

The 17th-century Moscow churches are also profusely decorated, but are much smaller in size. Earlier in the century, the Muscovites still favoured tent-like constructions. One of the favoured churches was Assumption Church in Uglich (1627): it had three graceful tents in a row, reminiscent of three burning candles. This composition was employed in the Hodegetria Church of Vyazma (1638) and the Nativity Church at Putinki, Moscow (1652). Assuming that such constructions ran counter to the traditional Byzantine type, the Patriarch Nikon declared them un-canonical. He encouraged building elaborate ecclesiastical residences (such as the Rostov Kremlin on the Nero Lake, which featured five tall churches, many towers, palaces, and chambers). Nikon designed his new residence at the New Jerusalem Monastery, which was dominated by a rotunda-like cathedral, the first of its type in Russia.

Since the tents were banned, the Muscovite architects had to replace them with successive rows of corbel arches (kokoshniks), and this decorative element was to become a hallmark of the 17th-century Moscow style. An early example of this style is the Kazan Cathedral on Red Square (1633–36). By the end of the century, more than 100 churches in the style were erected in Moscow. More examples are the Muscovite churches of the Holy Trinity at Nikitniki (1653), St Nicholas at Khamovniki (1682), and Holy Trinity at Ostankino (1692). One of the most representatives of the style was the Church of St Nicholas (the "Grand Cross") in the Kitai-gorod, which was demolished under Stalinist rule.

=== Italian influence ===
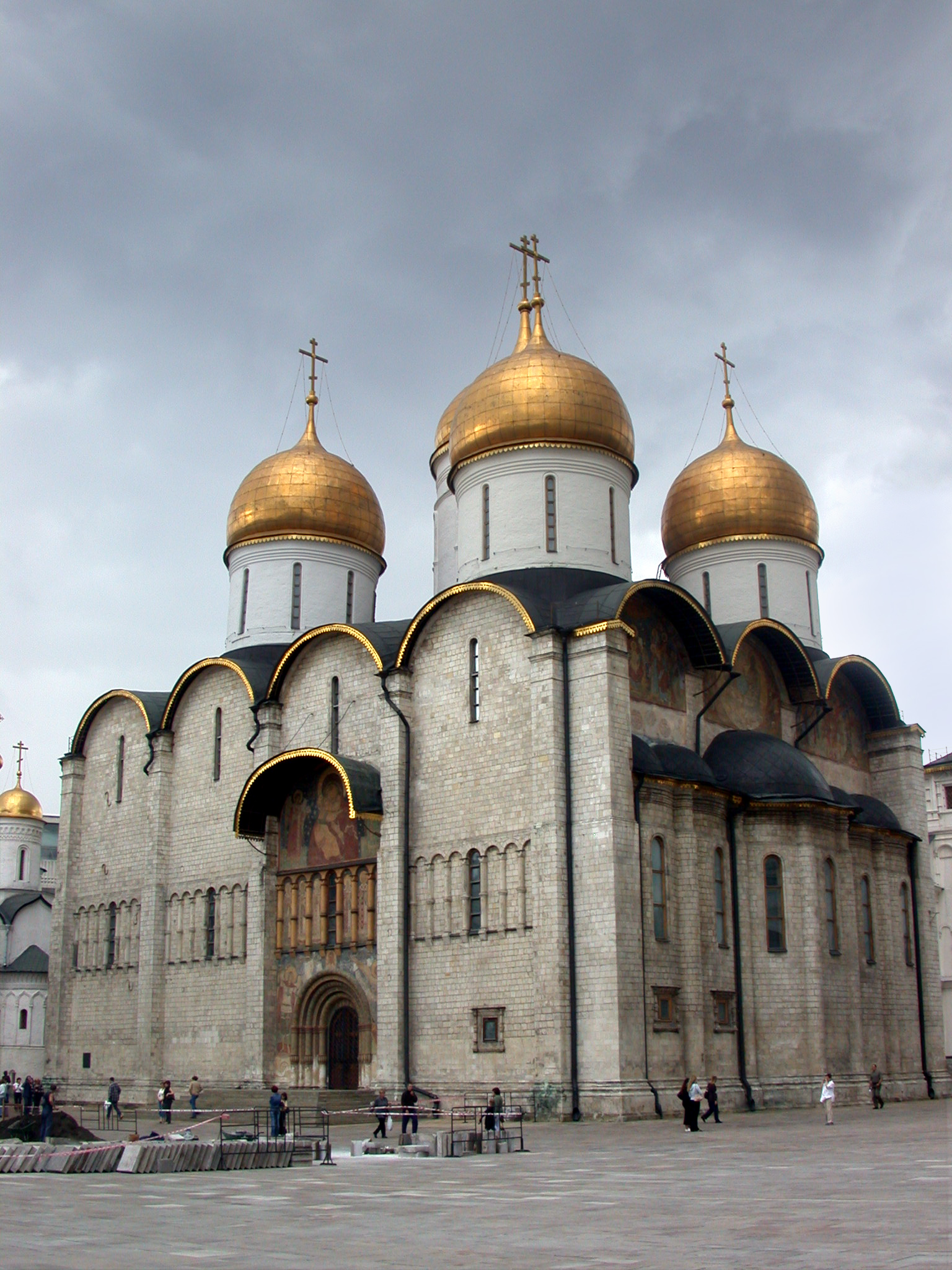
The Cathedral of the Dormition (1475–1479), Moscow

The first Italian architects arrived in Moscow in 1475. A Russian envoy to Italy during Ivan III's reign, Semion Tolbuzin, managed to recruit the Bolognese architect Aristotele Fioravanti (1420–1485), as well as his son and an assistant. Fioravanti had previous work in northern Italy, as well as working alongside Antonio Averlino Filarete for the Sforza family in Milan. In Moscow, he oversaw the dismantling of the remaining walls of the Dormition Cathedral, and the rebuilding of them. The foundations of these new walls were the deepest in Moscow constructed until then, and rather than using a rubble infill, and the walls were constructed of a solid bond masonry, resulting in walls thinner than what was typical in Muscovite masonry construction. In addition to introducing new construction techniques, he also founded a brickworks which created stronger bricks than those previously used in Moscow. Fioravanti also introduced the Italian Renaissance rationalism in the structural harmony of the plan according to geometric rules, resulting in the abandonment of the cross-inscribed church which had been the base plan of Moscovite and Rus churches for centuries. This new structural harmony is present in the new plan for the Cathedral of the Dormition. The design of the cathedral was overseen by the Russian clergy to intervene if it was deemed too “latinate” for the orthodox taste.

The walls of the Kremlin are also a derivation of a then-outdated style of Italian fortification engineering. The walls were redone between 1485 and 1516 using brick, replacing the original limestone walls that had fallen into disrepair. Several additions to the Kremlin were constructed by Pietro Antonio Solari, another Italian, such as the four entrance towers, the Arsenal tower, and the Kremlin wall facing the Red Square. Another Italian architect, Aloisio the New, built the cathedral of St Michael in the Kremlin (1505–1509). He incorporated several Italianate details in the facade and decoration of the cathedral, but maintained the traditional plan prototype.

The Cathedral of the Archangel Michael (1505) was one of the final churches commissioned by Ivan III. It was designed by the architect Aleviz Novyi. It is possible he is also the architect "Alvise Lamberti da Montagnana", who was noted as a student of the Venetian architect Mauro Codussi. The Cathedral of the Archangel Michael is more Venetian in style, as opposed to the Lombard style of Fioravanti.

== Russian Empire ==
=== Baroque ===
==== Naryshkin Baroque ====
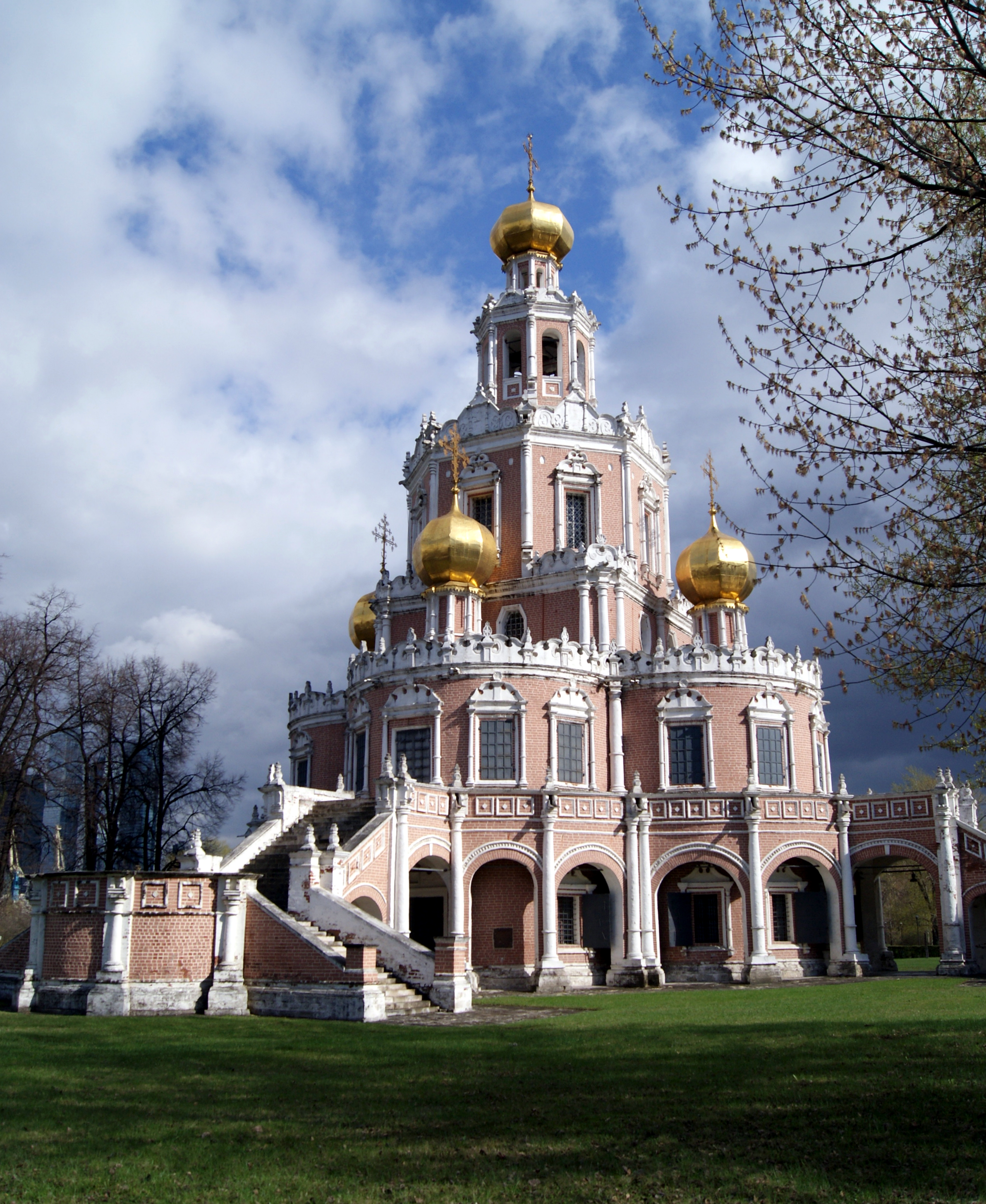
Church of the Intercession of the Holy Virgin in Fili.

Naryshkin Baroque, also known as Muscovite Baroque or Moscow Baroque, emerged in Moscow towards the end of the 17th century. The first of these structures were built on the Boyarin Naryshkin estate, hence the name Naryshkin Baroque. A characteristic of the Naryshkin Baroque is the combination of influences from western Europe with traditional Russian forms, and is mainly present in ecclesiastical architecture with a few secular examples. Naryshkin Baroque shows an evolution from previous, seemingly "Baroque" examples, which might seem Baroque in decoration, but still maintained the traditional structural form. There are several components characteristic to these newer structures, such as a focus on a balance of symmetry, carved limestone cornices, attached columns, and a more classical style.

Some of these churches are tower-like, showing a return to the Russian preference for a vertical silhouette, with cubic and octagonal floors placed atop each other (the Saviour Church at Ubory, 1697); others have a ladder-like composition, with a bell tower rising above the church itself (the Intercession Church at Fili, 1695). The decoration characteristic in this style would also tend to be extreme in quantity (e.g., the Trinity Church at Lykovo, 1696). One of the most impressive of the Naryshkin Baroque structures was the multi-domed Assumption Church on the Pokrovka Street in Moscow (built 1696–1699, demolished 1929). Its architect was also responsible for the "red and white" reconstruction of several Moscow monastic structures, notably the Novodevichy Convent and the Donskoy Monastery.

==== Petrine Baroque and St. Petersburg ====
Petrine Baroque is called thus due to Peter the Great's preference of this style. The style of Petrine Baroque reflects the preference for the more modest styles of Scandinavian and Dutch Baroque By Peter. Construction in this style is most apparent in Saint Petersburg, which was founded by Peter the Great in 1703 as the new capital. The three radiating streets of the urban plan were based on Versailles, and the city was also crossed by tree-bordered canals inspired by those in Amsterdam. To make way for this new Petrine Baroque capital, Peter forbade masonry construction in other parts of the country in 1714 to ensure a more stable supply of both materials and labour for construction in the city. Forty thousand peasants would be conscripted for the construction of the city, as well as Swedish prisoners of war.One of the main architects during the early development of the city was Domenico Trezzini, an Italian-swiss architect that worked closely with Peter to design the new city. Trezzini initially started by supervising the construction of the Kronshlot bastion, where he demonstrated his skill as an engineer, and was then commissioned to rebuild the fortifications in Narva, and the design of the Peter-Paul fortress would remain one of his main duties. Trezzini would then go on to design the Cathedral of Saints Peter and Paul, which showed a complete departure to the Russian ecclesiastical architecture of the six centuries prior. Instead of the inscribed cross typology that had been in use, he designed a basilical structure with a tower, rather than the modest dome, as the main focal point. Instead of the small windows, large windows amply illuminated the interior of the cathedral, another departure from the typical Russian church prototype. Trezzini would also design the architecture of the Alexander Nevskii Monastery, in a style that was distinctly secular and more closely resembled the administrative buildings and Palaces such as the Twelve Colleges on Vasilevskii Island (also designed by Trezzini). Among his other contributions were the design of model houses to be built throughout the city, and combined the plans of the city with the architectural views that would result.

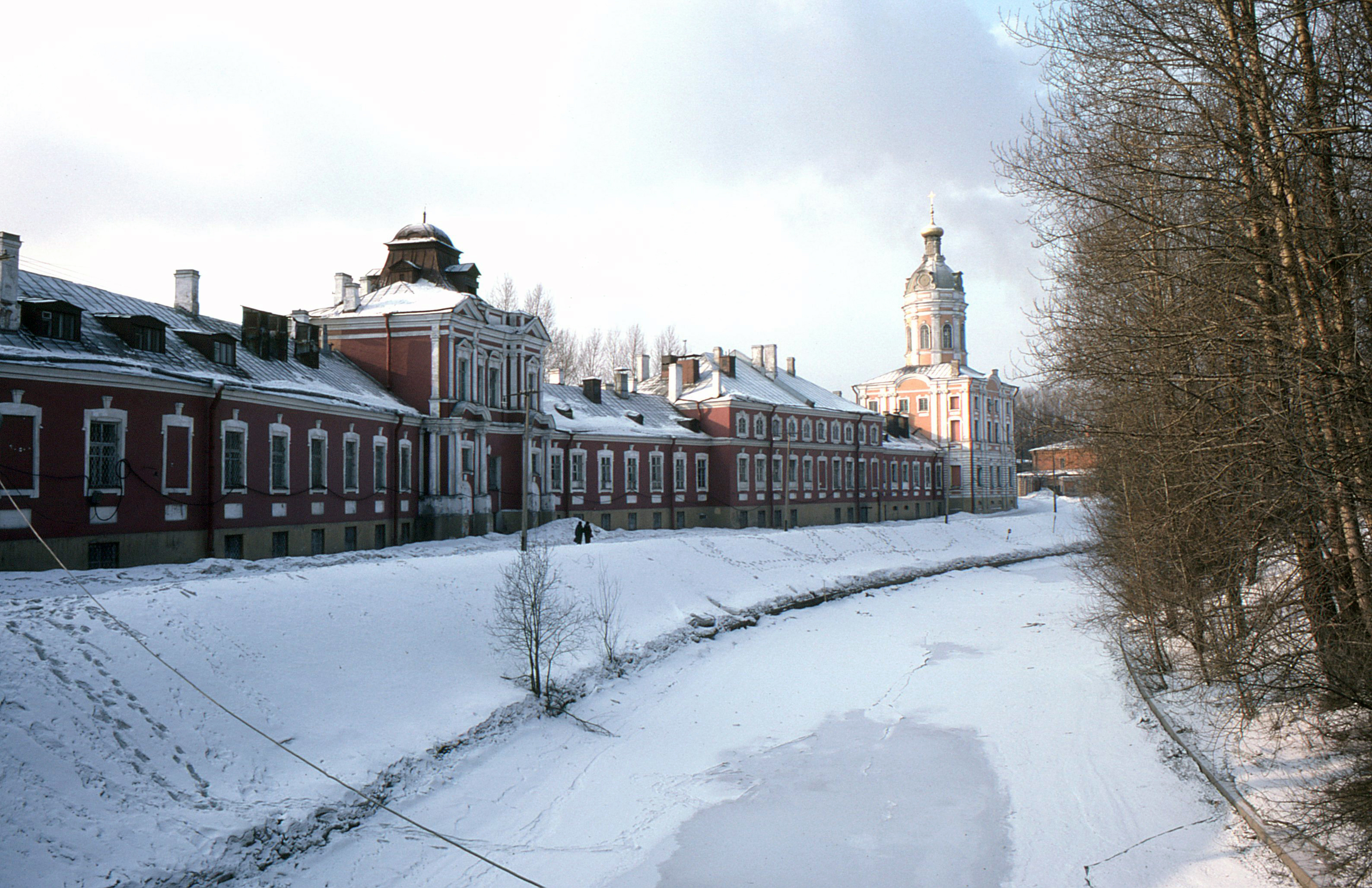
Alexander Nevskii Monastery in St Petersburg

Trezzini would also design the original, more modest, Winter Palace in the city for Peter which would then be engulfed into the larger Winter Palace constructed later. Many of these original Petrine palaces built in St Petersburg would either be demolished or incorporated into larger structures in the decades that followed. More examples of these palaces are found in the countryside around St Petersburg, and include the Summer Palace (1711–1714, designed by Trezzini), Menshikov Palace (1710–1720s, designed by Giovanni Mario Fontana and Gottfried Johann Shädel). These country palaces also serve as more untouched examples of this early Petrine palace architecture. Another significant architect was the French architect Jean-Baptiste Alexandre Le Blond, who had been a student of the landscape architect André Le Nôtre (landscape architect of the Palace gardens of Versailles) and in June 1716 Peter hired him as "General-architect" of Saint Petersburg. He would design the original main palace, Peterhof, which would then be expanded by later architects and rulers. One main difference with Petrine Baroque that departed from previous Russian architectural construction was that there was also large scale secular development, not just ecclesiastical construction. This reflected Peter the Great's ideals, and the development of his new capital city. Large projects for the military, civil administration, and palace architecture was undertook, and the same imported architects were central figures in their construction.

==== Late Baroque ====
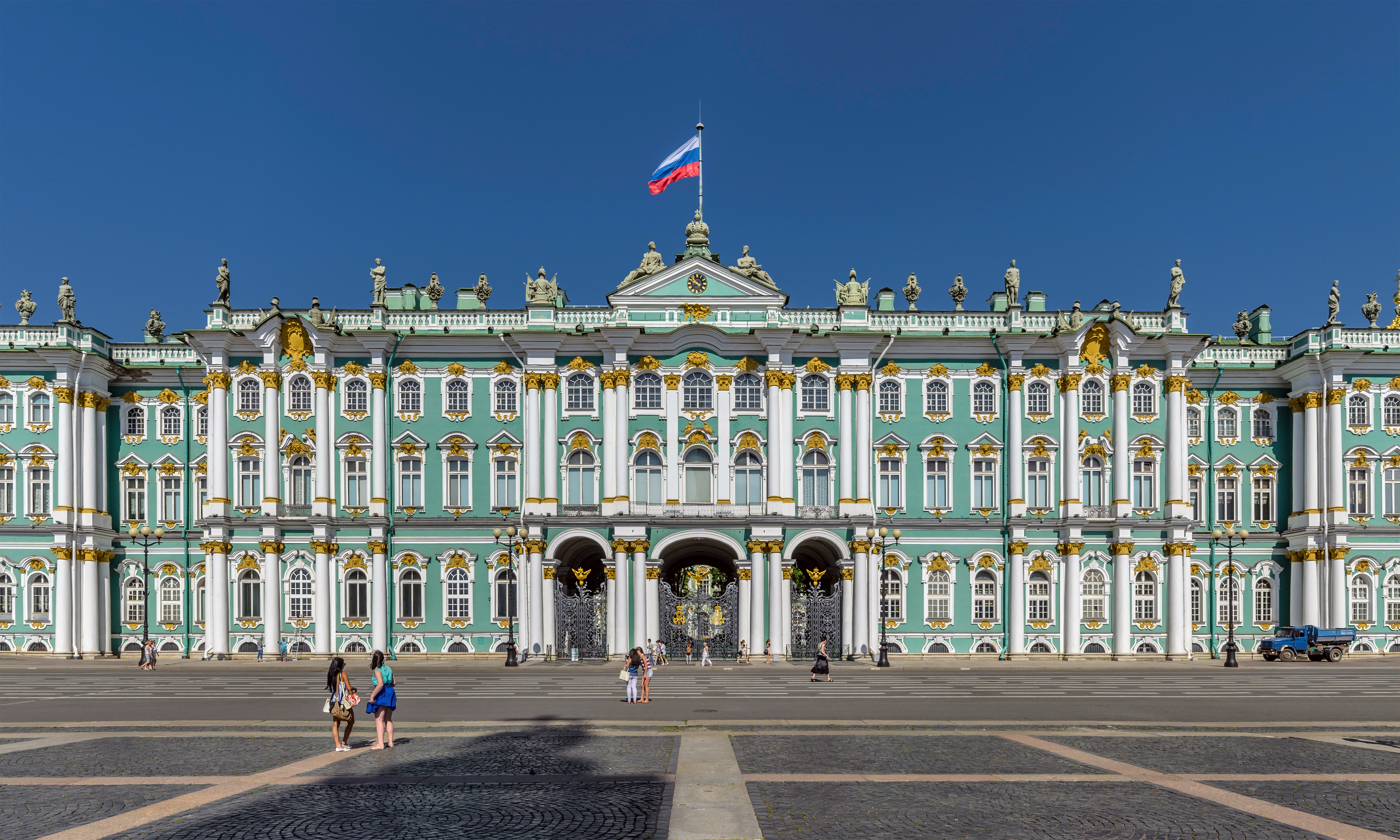
Winter Palace in St Petersburg

After Peter the Great's death and the ascension of Empress Anna to the throne, baroque construction in Saint Petersburg continued, this time under the employ of the Italian architect Francesco Bartolomeo Rastrelli. He had moved to St Petersburg in his youth with his father, the sculptor Carlo Rastrelli, in 1715, but their career stalled under a rivalry between Carlo Rastrelli and the architect Le Blonde. In 1730 they moved to Moscow, where the capital had been temporarily relocated, and either Francesco or his father were appointed court architect (it is unclear which Rastrelli it was) and were commissioned to design two wooden palaces (neither remain). They were the Winter Annenhof and the Summer Annenhof. Both served as precursors to his later work in St Petersburg once the capital was moved back. He would then go on to work on the Winter Palace in St Petersburg, becoming the most imposing residence in the city once it was finished in 1735. It would host two twin facades, one facing the Neva River and another facing the square, imposing and whose symmetry would only be broken twice by projecting bays. In plan the palace would be an elongated rectangle, enclosing a central court.

After Empress Anna's death in 1740 and Empress Elizabeth's ascension, there would be a brief lull in new commissions for Rastrelli, but as he remained the only architect capable of large-scale royal commissions his rank as Chief Architect was reinstated a few years later. He would continue to transition in style from a late Baroque to a Rococo style, apparent in his design of the Summer Palace in the Summer Garden, and signaled a further break from the more modest Petrine baroque. Rococo decorative elements would be present in his future designs such as in Peterhof and Tsarskoe Selo, and some historians have argued the connection between the polychromatism of his designs (which hosted more colour than his European counterparts) with the polychromatism present in much of the Russian architectural tradition that had preceded the importation of the baroque style. Several of Rastrelli's projects were re-designed under Catherine the Great, but many rooms still retain the original designs.

=== Neoclassicism ===
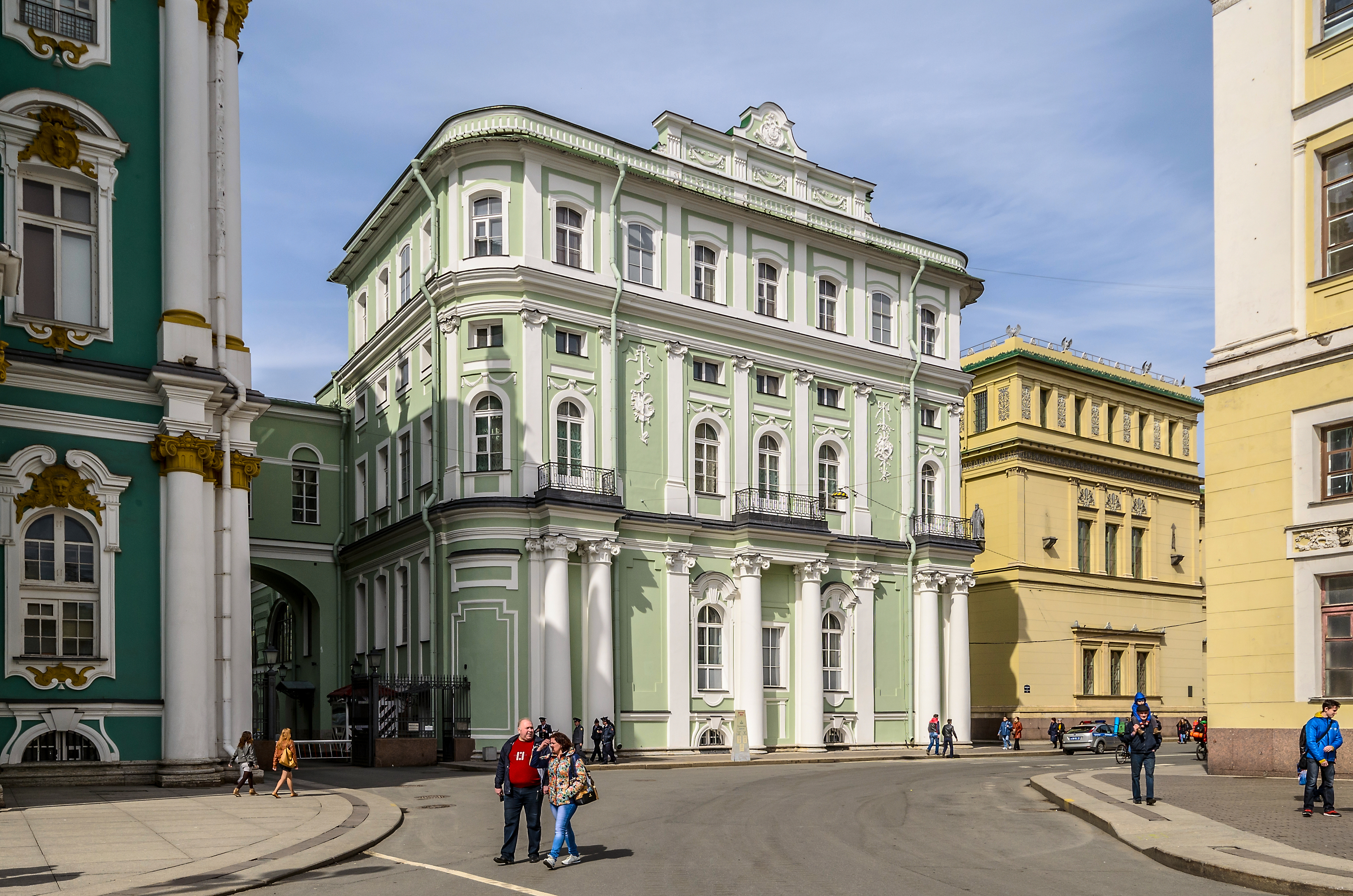
Small Hermitage, showcases the beginning of Neoclassicism in St Petersburg

The Neoclassical in Russia not only draws influence from the Neoclassical style prevalent in France and England, but also drew from as much as it rejected the Baroque that had become prevalent in Russia over the 17th and early 18th century. The Russian neoclassical style drew its inspiration from the works of Palladio, Vignola, Vitruvius, and other writers on the classical orders, something that had started during the early 18th century, but had not been as apparent over the period of time where the baroque style was most prevalent. While a departure from the baroque into the neoclassical style was already in place before Catherine the Great's reign, it flourished under her rule. She had a great passion for architecture, evident in her letters to her advisor on cultural matters, and remarked on her dislike of the baroque extravaganza of Elizabeth's preferred style, thinking it as disorderly and lacking in rationality. The neoclassical under Catherine was especially French in style, partly because of the two main architects in the time, Vallin de la Mothe (French and trained in France and Italy) and Alexander Kokorinov (studied with Korobov and Ukhtomskii in Moscow) who had francophile sympathies.

In comparison to the extravagance of the Winter Palace, de la Mothe and Kokorinov's design for the Academy of Arts was an example of classical simplicity. The building's facade and its five part division drew from the model established by Le Vau, Perrault, and Le Brun on the Louvre, while using modest pilasters to define the middle sections. The exterior also lacks the bichromatic scheme of the earlier styles present in St Petersburg, instead using colours that mimicked simple a simple stone facade. The rest of the facade also lacks in decoration, instead being a showcase of neoclassical rationalism and uses the first example of "proper" entablature in Russian architecture. Vallin de la Mothe would go on to design the Small Hermitage (1764–1775) to house Catherine the Great's art collection, furthering the use of simplicity in neoclassicism with detached, austere columns and a muting of the vivid colours of the rest of St Petersburg's colours.

After Catherine, the imperial building tradition would continue under Alexander I, who favoured the neoclassical Empire style of architecture, as was popular during the period, and continued the French influence in the architecture of the time. The architect Andrei Nikiforovich Voronikhin was a pupil of Wailly in Paris and would design the Virgin of Kazan cathedral in St. Petersburg (1801–1811) and boasted a domed center flanked by quadrant colonnade. The Greek revival style is also apparent in his design for the Academy of Mines (1806–1811) which has a decastyle portico of Paestum Doric columns. Another architect, the frenchman Thomas de Thomom would design the Grand Bolshoi theatre (1802–1805, destroyed 1813) and modeled it after the Theatre-Francais in Paris. More buildings included the New Admiralty Building (1806–1823, designed by the Russian born, French trained architect Adrian Dmitrievich Zakharov), the New Michael Palace (1819–1825, designed by Karl Ivanovich Rossi, today the Russian Museum), and St Isaac's Cathedral (1817–1857, designed by Auguste Ricard de Montferrand).

=== Historicism and eclecticism ===
In the 1830s, Nicholas I eased regulation in architecture, opening the trade to several incarnations of early eclecticism. Konstantin Ton's pseudo-Russian designs became the preferred choice in church construction (Cathedral of Christ the Saviour, 1832–1883), while his public buildings followed Renaissance tradition, exemplified in the Great Kremlin Palace (1838–1849) and the Kremlin Armoury (1844–1851). The subsequent reigns of Alexander II and Alexander III promoted a Russian Byzantine Revival in church architecture, while civil construction followed the same variety of eclecticism common in all European countries; this featured ever-growing national revival trends, vernacular and imaginary.

Between 1895 and 1905, architecture was briefly dominated by Russian Art Nouveau, most active in Moscow (Lev Kekushev, Fyodor Schechtel and William Walcot). While it remained a popular choice until the outbreak of World War I, in 1905–1914 it gave way to the Russian neoclassical revival – merging the Empire style and Palladian tradition with contemporary construction technology.

== Soviet period ==
=== Post-revolution ===
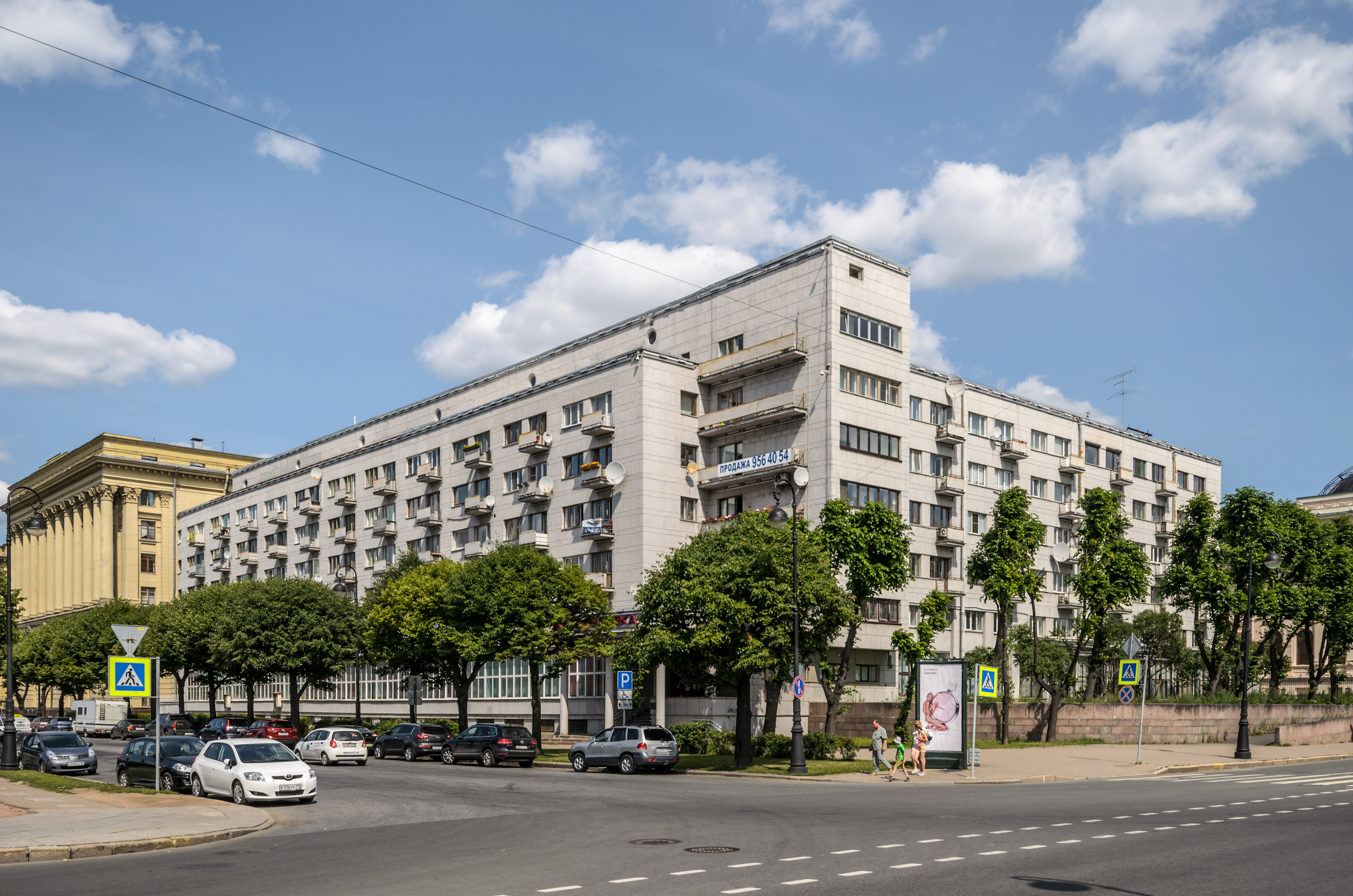
Political Convicts House in Saint Petersburg, 1933.

In the first year of Soviet rule all architects refusing to emigrate (and the new generation) denounced any classical heritage in their work and began to propagate formalism, the most influential of all Revivalist themes. Great plans were drawn for large, technically advanced cities. The most ambitious of all was the Monument to the Third International, planned in 1919 by Vladimir Tatlin (1885–1953), а 400-meter spiral, wound around a tilted central axis with rotating glass chambers. Impossible in real life, the Tatlin Tower inspired a generation of Constructivist architects in Russia and abroad. The Shukhov Tower, rising 160 metres (520 ft) above Moscow, was completed in 1922. According to the initial plans, the hyperboloid tower by Vladimir Shukhov with a height of 350 metres (1,150 ft) had an estimated mass of 2,200 tonnes (2,200,000 kg), while the Eiffel Tower in Paris (with a height of 350 metres (1,150 ft)) weighs 7,300 tonnes (7,300,000 kg).

Residents of apartment buildings were sealed, they were hooked by new tenants. The so-called kommunalka became the most common type of accommodation for the residents of large cities. In each communal apartment one room belonged to one family, while bathroom, toilet and kitchen were shared. Such a scheme was widespread until the mid-1950s, and in some cities there are more communal apartments. At the same time with the 1930s for senior people began to build houses with separate bedroom apartments, where one family was given the whole apartment. An example of such a house called House on the Embankment (Dom na naberezhnoi) in Moscow, built in 1927–1931, respectively.

An important priority during the post-revolutionary period was the mass reconstruction of cities. In 1918 Alexey Shchusev (1873–1949) and Ivan Zholtovsky founded the Mossovet Architectural Workshop, where the complex planning of Moscow's reconstruction as a new Soviet capital took place. The workshop employed young architects who later emerged as avant-garde leaders. At the same time architectural education, concentrated in the Vkhutemas, was divided between revivalists and modernists.

In 1919, Petrograd saw a similar planning and educational setup, headed by experienced revivalist Ivan Fomin (1872–1936). Other cities followed suit and the results of the work carried out there were to make dramatic changes in traditional Russian city layout. The first large-scale development templates (generalny plan) were drawn there. The city was planned as a series of new wide avenues, massive public structures and the improvement of workers' housing with heat and plumbing. The first apartment building of this period was completed in 1923, followed by a surge of public-housing construction in 1925–1929.

In Petrograd from 1917 to 1919 the first example of the new style was built on the Field of Mars – a monument, "Strugglers of the Revolution", designed by Lev Rudnev (1886–1956). This complex consisted of a series of simple, expressive granite monoliths and became the focal point for further development in Soviet sculptural and memorial architecture. The most famous construction of this time, however, was Lenin's Mausoleum by Alexey Shchusev. Originally it was a temporary wooden structure, topped by a pyramid, with two wings (for entry and exit). In 1930 it was replaced with the present building, built of stone. The combination of dark red and black labradorite enhanced its slender, precise construction.

The rapid development of technological processes and materials also influenced constructivist elements in structure design. During the erection of the Volkhov Hydroelectric Station (1918–26, architects O.Munts and V.Pokrovsky), the traditional outline on the window arches is still used (despite concrete being used in construction). The Dnieper Hydroelectric Station (1927–32), built by a collective of architects headed by Viktor Vesnin (1882–1950), has an innovative design featuring a curved dam with a rhythmic pattern of foundations. Creative unions played a large role in the architectural life of 1920s Russia. One of these was the Association of New Architects (ASNOVA), formed in 1923, which promoted the idea of synthesising architecture and other creative arts to give buildings an almost sculptural feeling. These buildings were to serve as visual points for the orientation of a human in space. Members of ASNOVA also designed Moscow's first skyscrapers, none of which were realised at the time (1923–1926).

Another innovation from post-revolutionary Russia was a new type of public building: the Workers' Club and the Palace of Culture. These became a new focus for architects, who used the visual expression of large elements combined with industrial motifs. The most famous of these was the Zuev Workers' Club (1927–29) in Moscow by Ilya Golosov (1883–1945), whose composition relied on the dynamic contrast of simple shapes, planes, complete walls and glazed surfaces.

Symbolic expression in construction was a feature in works designed by Konstantin Melnikov (1890–1974), notably the Rusakov Workers' Club (1927–1929) in Moscow. Visually, the building resembles part of a gear; each of the three cantilevered concrete "teeth" is a balcony of the main auditorium, which could be used individually or combined into a large theatre hall. The sharpness of its composition and the "transition" of internal space (called by Melnikov a "tensed muscle") made it one of the most important examples of Soviet architecture.

=== Post-war ===
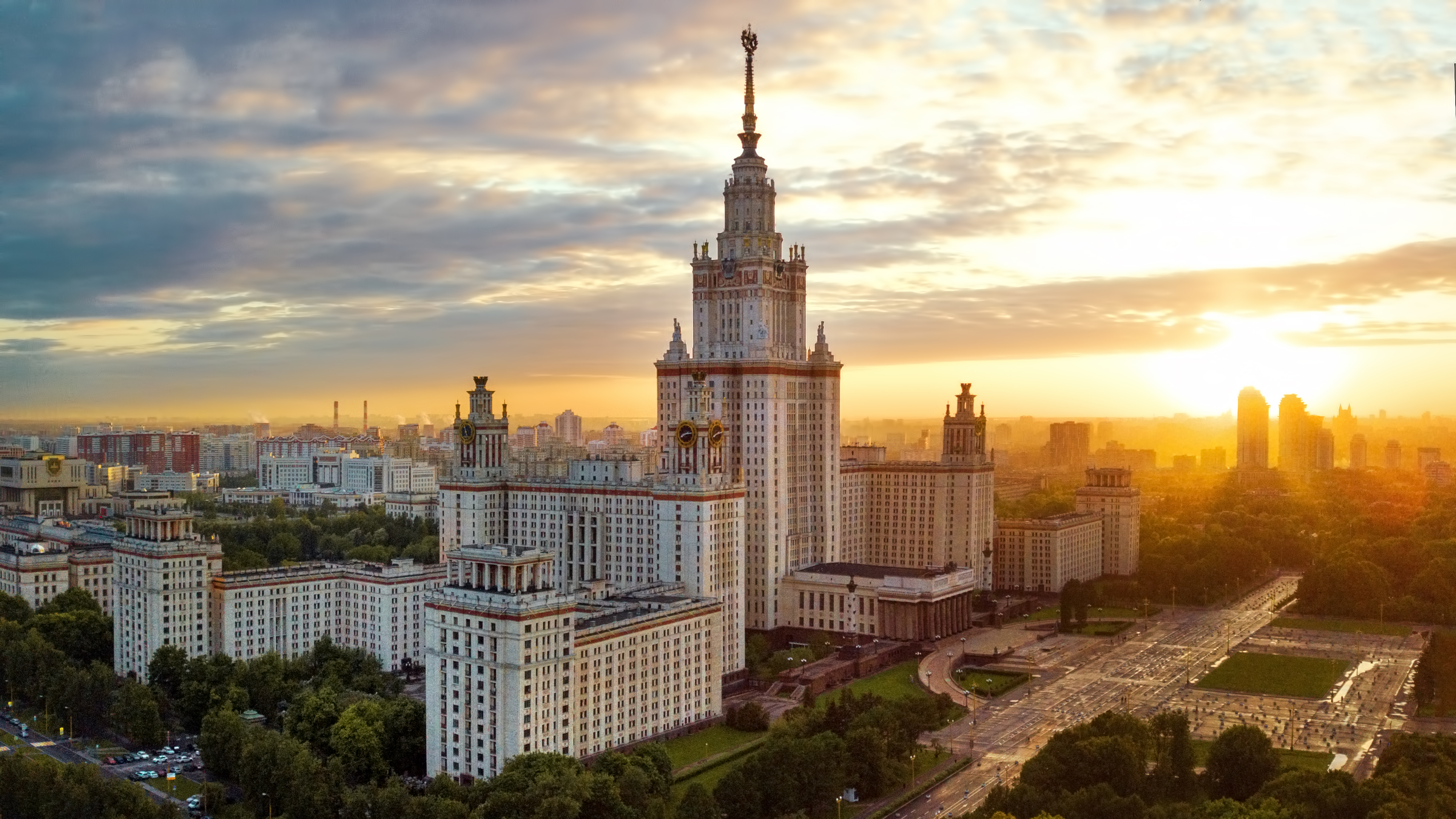
The main building of Moscow State University

Stalinist architecture put a premium on conservative monumentalism. During the 1930s there was rapid urbanisation as a result of Stalin's policies, and there was an international competition to build the Palace of the Soviets in Moscow at that time. After 1945, the focus was on both rebuilding structures destroyed in World War II and erecting new ones: seven high-rise buildings were built at symbolic points in the Moscow area. The construction of Moscow University (1948–1953), by Lev Rudnev and associates, is particularly notable for its use of space. Another example is the Exhibition Centre in Moscow, built for the second All-Union Agricultural Exhibition (VSKhV) in 1954. This featured a series of pavilions, each decorated in representative style. Other well-known examples are the stations of the Moscow and Saint Petersburg Metros built during the 1940s and 1950s, famous for their extravagant design and vivid decoration. In general, Stalinist architecture changed the appearance of many post-war cities; much survives to this day in central avenues and public buildings.

Following Stalin's death in 1953, social and political changes rocked the country; construction priorities and architecture were also affected. In 1955 Nikita Khrushchev, faced with the slow pace of housing construction, called for drastic measures to accelerate the process. This involved developing new mass-production technology and removing "decorative extras" from buildings. On special plants that were built in every major city had launched production of special concrete blocks ready openings for doors and windows of which were built houses. These prefabricated blocks were brought from the factory ready-made and installed on the steel frame of a house. Houses built in this way were called block houses. All projects such houses have become standardized and have been summarized in several series (for example II-32 series), which were built houses. Projects for a buyout built schools, kindergartens and hospitals were also typical. This put an effective end to Stalinist architecture; however, the transition was slow. Most projects in the planning state or under construction by 1955 were directly affected; the result, at times, was entire areas becoming esthetically asymmetrical. A well-known example occurred in the postwar reconstruction of the Ukrainian capital, Kiev (now Kyiv), in which the planned Kreschatik avenue and its central square (Ploschad Kalinina) were to form a single rich space enclosed by Stalinist architecture. As the buildings enclosing the latter were in completion, the architects were forced to alter their plans and the area was left unfinished until the early 1980s. In particular Hotel Ukrayina, which was to crown the square with a look similar to one of Moscow's "Seven Sisters", was left as a solid shape without a top spire or any rich external decoration.

Nevertheless, as the buildings became more square and simple they brought with them a new style fueled by the Space Age: functionality. The State Kremlin Palace is an hommage to an earlier attempt to bridge rapidly changing styles dictated by the state. The Ostankino Tower, by Nikolai Nikitin, symbolizes technological advances and the future. In addition to simpler buildings, the 1960s are remembered for massive housing plans. A typical project was developed using concrete panels to make a simple, five-story house. These Pyatietazhki became the dominant housing construction. Although rapidly built, their quality was poor compared with earlier housing; their monotonous appearance contributed to the grey and dull stereotype characteristic of socialist cities.

As the 1970s began, Leonid Brezhnev allowed architects more freedom; soon, housing of varied design was built. Blocks of flats were taller and more decorated, called Brezhnevka; large mosaics on their sides became a feature. In nearly all cases, these were built not as standalone construction but as part of large estates known as Microdistricts. which soon became a central feature of Soviet cities. In contrast to the houses built in the 1950s–1960s, which had up to 5 floors, new residential buildings were higher and could have up to nine or more floors, although the house with fewer floors continued to be built. Each complex includes an extensive area with a yard for walks, a playground with swings, a sandbox for the games and sites for parking vehicles, which are often supplemented by garages for cars, lined up separately from the residential buildings. This principle remains today. Public buildings were built with a variety of themes. Some (like the White House of Russia) made direct connections to earlier 1950s architecture, with a white marble-faced exterior and large bas-reliefs on the wings.

== Post-Soviet period ==
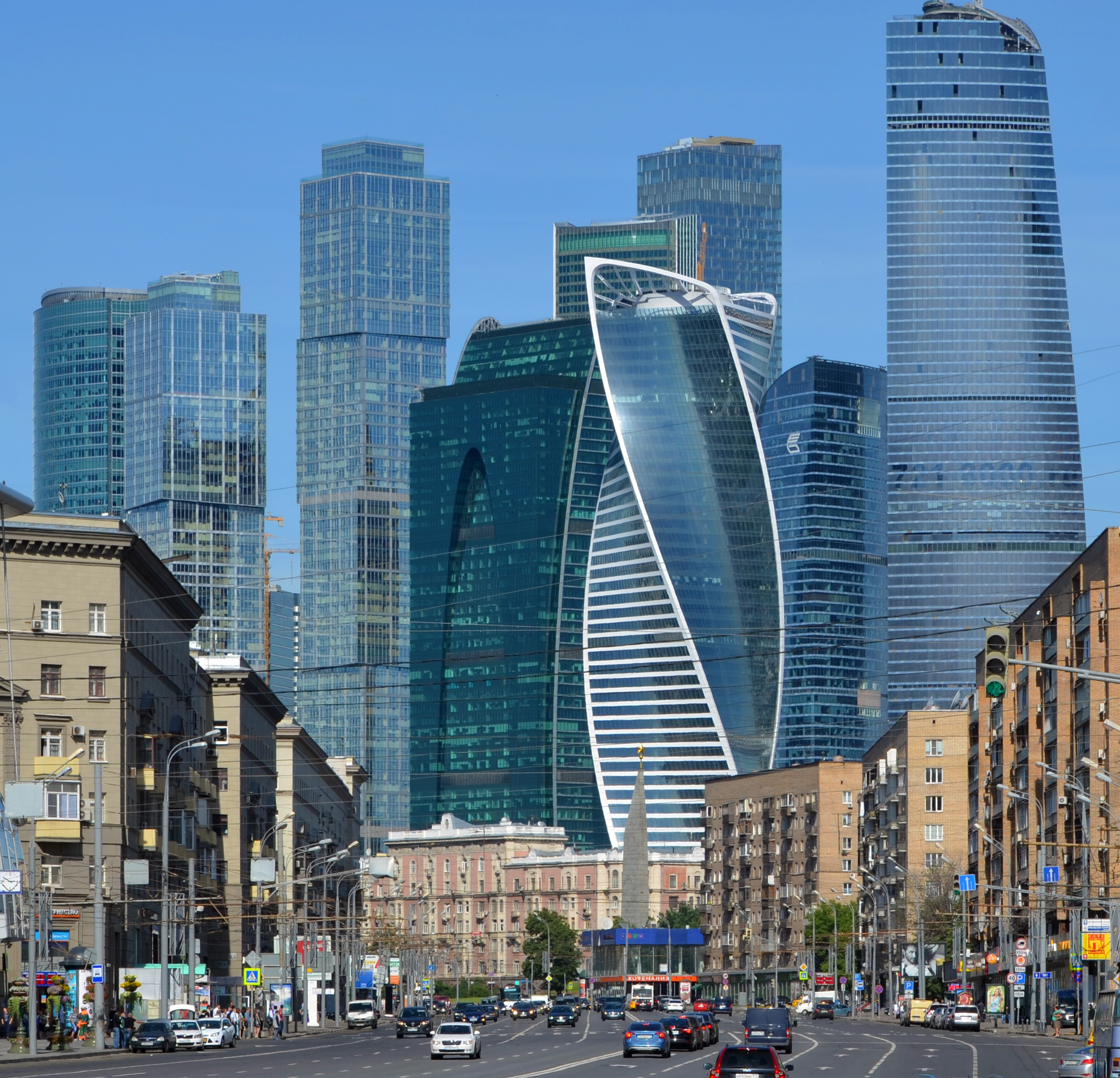
Moscow International Business Center.

As the Soviet Union fell apart, many of its projects were put on hold and some cancelled altogether. However, for the first time there was no longer any control over what theme a building should have or how high it should be. As a result, with generally improving financial conditions architecture grew at a high rate. For the first time modern methods of skyscraper construction were implemented, this resulted in the ambitious Moscow International Business Center. In other cases, architects returned to successful designs of Stalinist architecture, which resulted in buildings like the Triumph Palace in Moscow. New Classical Architecture is also appearing more consistently throughout modern Russia, with a large complex being proposed for Saint Petersburg.

== See also ==
- Russian Revival architecture
- List of tallest buildings in Russia
- List of Russian architects
- Urban planning in Russia
- Latvian Academy of Sciences
- Alexander Nevsky Cathedral, Warsaw
- Warsaw Palace of Culture and Science
- Russian Church, Sofia
- Wooden architecture of Russia

== Bibliography ==
- "Architecture: Kievan Rus and Russia" in Encyclopædia Britannica (Macropedia) vol. 13, 15th ed., 2003, p. 921.
- William Craft Brumfield, A History of Russian Architecture. University of Washington Press, 2004 (originally published 1998) ISBN 978-0-295-98393-6.
- William Craft Brumfield, Landmarks of Russian Architecture: A Photographic Survey. Amsterdam: Gordon and Breach, 1997
- William Craft Brumfield, Lost Russia: Photographing the Ruins of Russian Architecture. Duke University Press, 2015 (originally published 1995) ISBN 978-0-822-31568-1.
- William Craft Brumfield, "The Development of Medieval Church Architecture in the Vologda Region of the Russian North" Architectural History, Vol. 40, 1997, pp. 64–80
- John Fleming, Hugh Honour, Nikolaus Pevsner. "Russian Architecture" in The Penguin Dictionary of Architecture and Landscape Architecture, 5th ed., [1966] 1998, pp. 493–498, London: Penguin. ISBN 0-670-88017-5.
- Russian art and architecture, in The Columbia Encyclopedia, Sixth Edition, 2001–05.
- Encyclopædia BritannicaWestern architecture retrieved 12 August 2005
- About.com feature on Russian architecture retrieved 12 August 2005
- Grove Art Online articles on Russian architecture Oxford University Press 2005 retrieved 12 August
- Russian Life July/August 2000 Volume 43 Issue 4 "Faithful Reproduction" an interview with Russian architecture expert William Brumfield on the rebuilding of Christ the Saviour Cathedral
- David Watkin, A History of Western Architecture 6th ed., 2015, London, Laurence King Publishing ISBN 978-1-78067-597-8.
- Francis D.K. Ching, Mark Jarzombek, Vikramaditya Prakash, A Global History of Architecture 3rd ed., 2017, Hoboken, New Jersey, John Wiley & Sons, Inc. ISBN 9781118981337.
- Arthur Voyce, "National Elements in Russian Architecture", Journal of the Society of Architectural Historians May 1957, No 2, pp. 6–16
