= Lipno Church =

Coordinates: 58.4486°N 31.3489°E

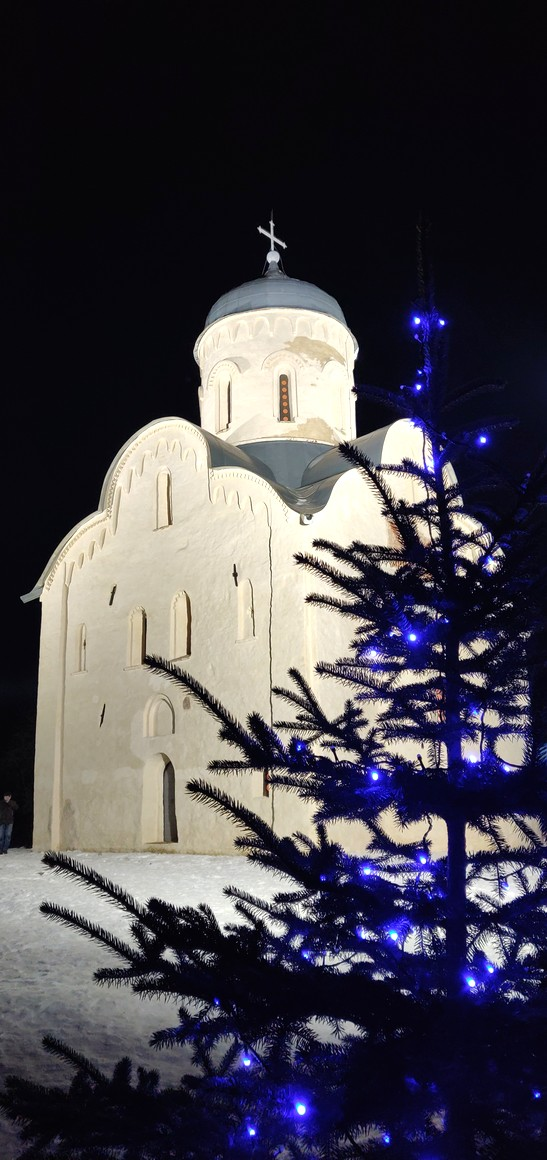
The church during Christmas, 2021

Saint Nicholas Church on Lipno Island (Russian: церковь Николы на Липне) is a late 13th-century Russian Orthodox church sitting on a small island in the delta of the Msta River, 9 kilometres (5.6 mi) south of Novgorod. Its design harks back to the Nativity Church on Peryn Island. It is part of the Historic Monuments of Novgorod and Surroundings, a World Heritage Site inscribed in 1992.

== History ==
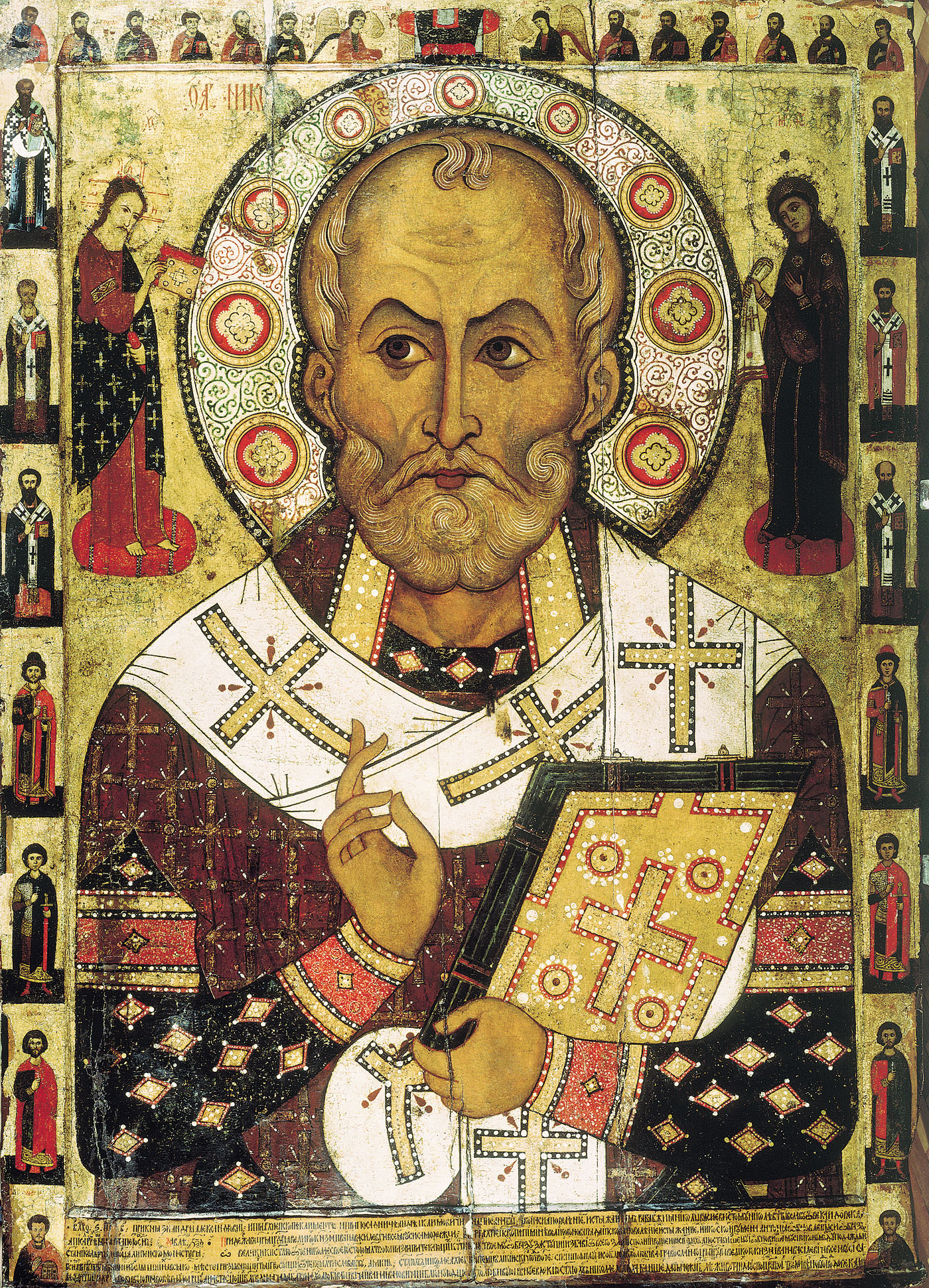
The Lipno icon of St. Nicholas

The main altar is consecrated in the name of Saint Nicholas. A large icon (184 cm in height) was painted for the church by Aleksa Petrov in 1294. The fact was notable enough to be mentioned in the Third Novgorod Chronicle. This painting — among the most famous of all Russian icons — is now exhibited at the Novgorod Kremlin museum.

In the 18th and 19th centuries, the church had no parishioners and was almost deserted. After the Bolshevik Revolution in 1917, its belfry was pulled down. A set of 13th-century frescoes was discovered under a layer of plaster in 1930. Despite its remote location, the building sustained heavy damage during the World War II, so that about 35% of medieval masonry had to be replaced.

On 6 January 2021, Russian president Vladimir Putin attended a Christmas Eve service at the church.
