= Snegirev =

Snegirev or Snegiryov (Russian: Снегирёв) is a Russian male surname, its feminine counterpart is Snegireva or Snegiryova. Notable people with the surname include:

- Ivan Snegiryov (1793–1868), Russian ethnographer
- Max Snegirev (born 1987), Russian racing driver
