= Peryn Chapel =

Church building in Veliky Novgorod, Russia

Coordinates: 58°28′23″N 31°16′29″E

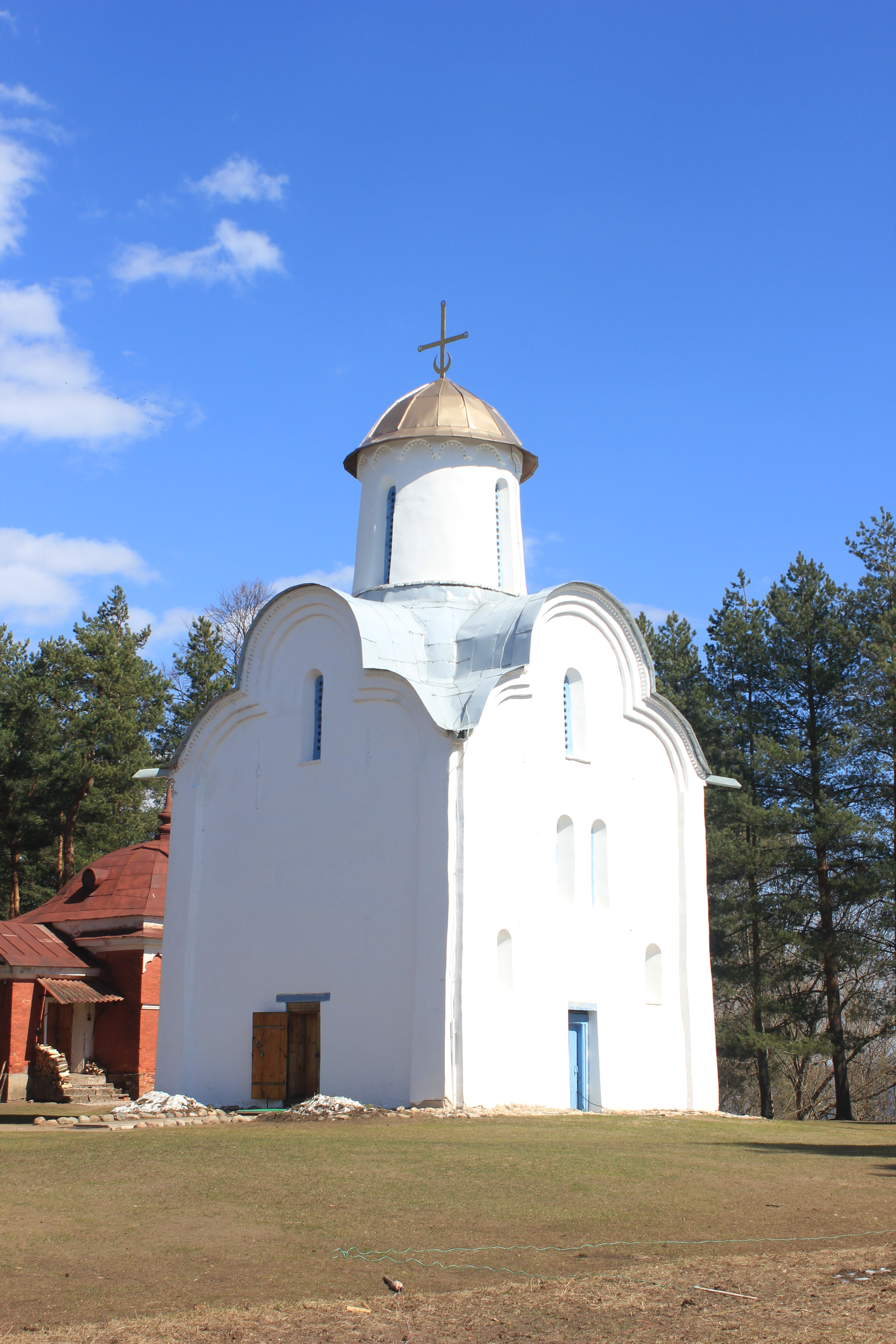

The Church of the Nativity of the Theotokos on Peryn (Russian: Церковь Рождества Богородицы на Перыни, romanized: Tserkov Rozhdestva Bogoroditsy na Peryni), in the environs of Veliky Novgorod is one of the region's oldest churches, dating from the 1220s. The church is located 6 kilometres (3.7 mi) from Veliky Novgorod, by the source of the Volkhov River where it flows out of Lake Ilmen. The church is a part of the Peryn Skete, a former monastery abolished in the 18th century, and is the only functioning church in the complex.

The Peryn Chapel is on the World Heritage list as a part of object 604 Historic Monuments of Novgorod and Surroundings. The building has been designated an architectural monument of federal significance (#5310037007).

Presumably, the church was built on a site previously consecrated to the pagan god Perun, hence the name. The first church on the site was built in 991. Later, it became a part of a monastery. The current church was built in the 1220s. It was fully restored after World War II and returned to the Russian Orthodox Church in the 1990s.

The church is built of flat bricks and stone. It has a foundation in the shape of a square. The church has four internal pillars and one dome. It is notable in particular for its small size, measuring only 8 metres (26 ft) in both length and width.
