= Charitina of Lithuania =

Saint in the Eastern Orthodox Church

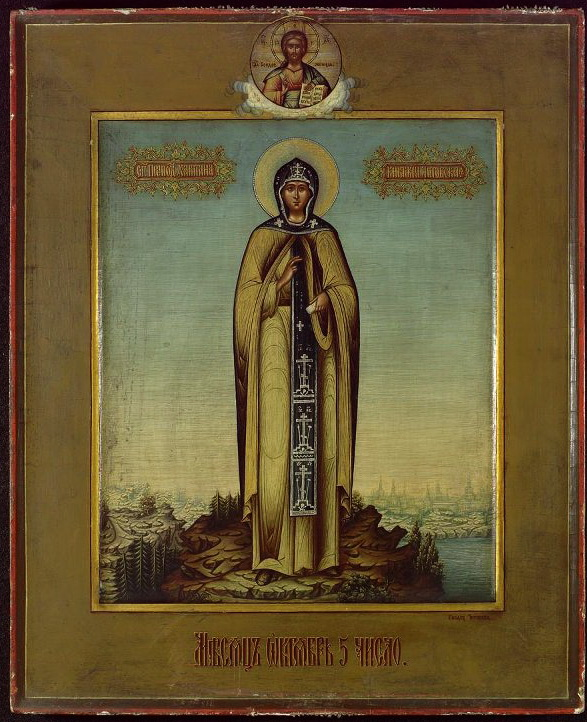
Charitina of Lithuania

Charitina of Lithuania (died 1281) is a saint in the Eastern Orthodox Church. Her feast is on 5 October. Because her hagiography did not survive, very little is known about her life.

Charitina was a noblewoman from the pagan Grand Duchy of Lithuania who became a nun in Novgorod. Possibly she was arranged to marry a Prince of Novgorod, but that could be a conflation of Charitina with Euphrosyne of Suzdal who was betrothed to Fyodor, eldest son of Yaroslav II of Vladimir. In Novgorod, unmarried Charitina entered the Monastery of Saints Peter and Paul. There she earned the reputation of piousness and became an abbess. In 2009, Lithuanian literary historian Algimantas Bučys raised a hypothesis that she might be a daughter of Tautvilas, who escaped to Novgorod after her father's murder by Treniota.
