= Aleksa Petrov =

13th-century Russian icon painter

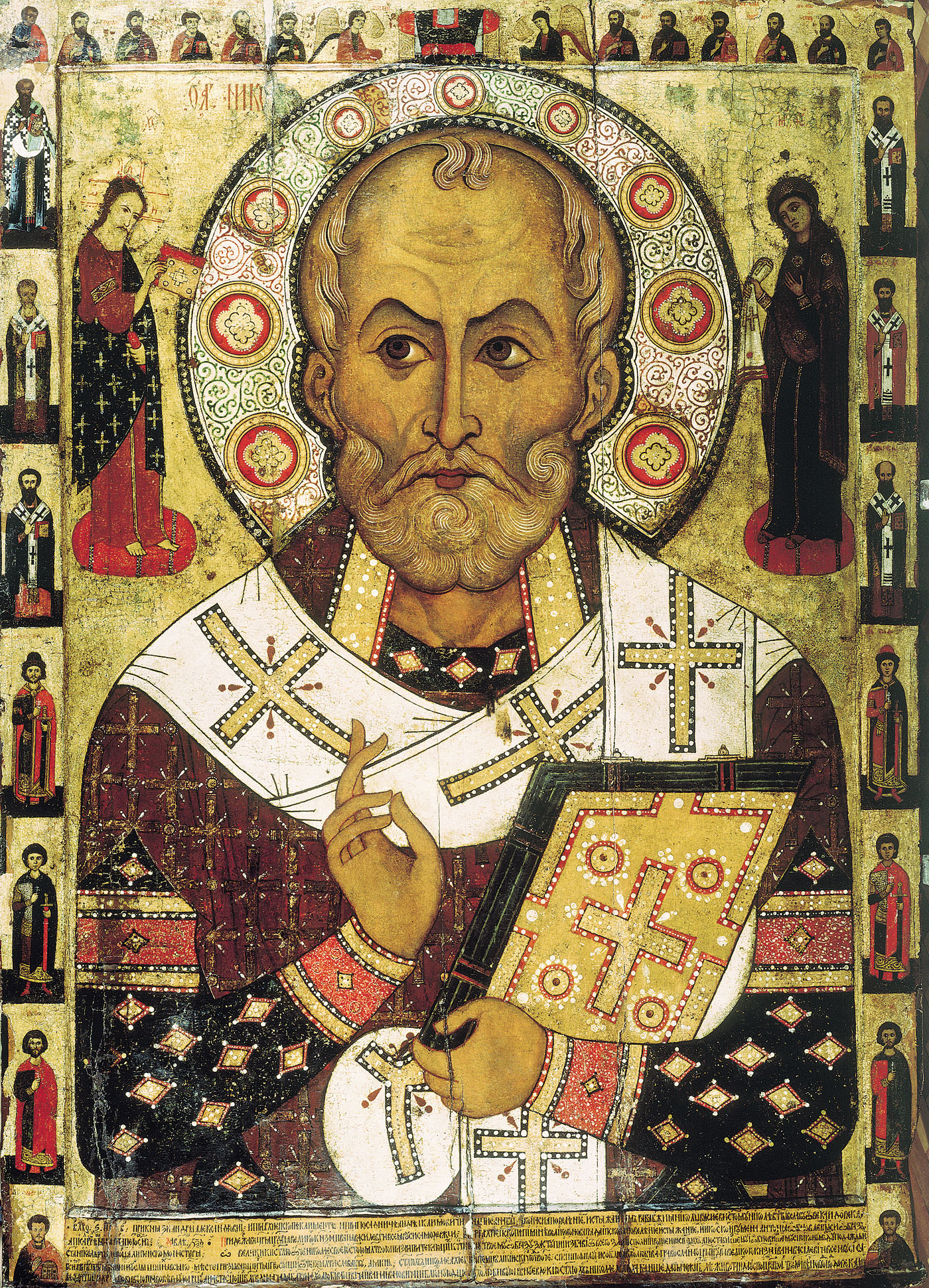
Nikola Lipensky, 1294

Aleksa Petrov (Russian: Алекса Петров) was a 13th-century Russian icon painter. He is known for painting a large icon of Saint Nicholas in the Lipno Church near Novgorod, dated to 1294.

== Work ==
The large icon of Saint Nicholas in the Lipno Church is dated to 1294, a date confirmed by both an inscription on the lower margin of the icon and a mention in the Novgorod Third Chronicle. The inscription was reproduced during a restoration in 1556 and contains the names of the patron who commissioned the icon and the icon painter, as well as the prince, archbishop, and posadnik (mayor).

The icon follows traditional Byzantine iconography; however, the vestments and their ornamentation display Romanesque features, suggesting that Aleksa Petrov was a native of Novgorod who was familiar with the Catholic art of Western Europe.

== Sources ==
- Buseva-Davydova, I. L. (2005). "Алекса Петров". In Kravets, S. L. (ed.). Большая российская энциклопедия. Том 1: А — Анкетирование (in Russian). Большая российская энциклопедия. p. 432. ISBN 5-85270-329-X. Archived from the original on 28 April 2026.
- Gordienko, E. A. (2000). "Алекса Петров". Православная энциклопедия. Т. I: А — Алексий Студит (in Russian). Moscow: Православная энциклопедия. p. 472. ISBN 5-89572-006-4.
- Preobrazhensky, Aleksandr (2021). "Надписи с именами русских иконописцев XIII–XV веков" [Inscriptions with Names of Russian Icon Painters of the 13th–15th Centuries]. Искусство византийского мира. Индивидуальность в художественном творчестве. Сборник статей в честь Ольги Сигизмундовны Поповой [Art of the Byzantine World. Individuality in Artistic Creativity. A Collection of Essays in Honor of Olga Popova] (in Russian). Moscow: State Institute for Art Studies. pp. 420–445. ISBN 978-5-98287-163-3.
