= Maria Yakunchikova =

Russian artist (1870–1902)

Maria Vasilyevna Yakunchikova-Weber
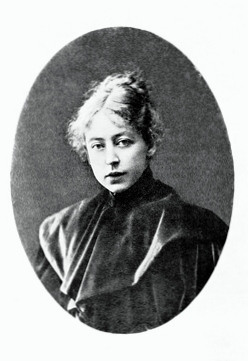
- Portrait of Maria Yakunchikova
- Born: January 19, 1870; Wiesbaden, Germany
- Died: December 27, 1902 (aged 32); Geneva, Switzerland
- Education: Moscow School of Painting, Sculpture and Architecture, Académie Julian
- Known for: Painting, Embroidery, Graphic arts
- Movement: Art Nouveau, World of Art
- Spouse: L. N. Weber
- Website: yakunchikova.com

Maria Vasilievna Yakunchikova-Weber (Russian: Мария Васильевна Якунчикова-Вебер) (January 19, 1870 – December 27, 1902) was a Russian painter and graphic artist.

== Early life and education ==
Yakunchikova was born in Wiesbaden, Germany in a prosperous industrialist family, and grew up in Moscow. Her family was very musical: her father, Vasily Ivanovich, was an expert at the violin, while her mother, Zinaida, played the pianoforte. Indeed, her father sponsored the construction of the Moscow Conservatory.

Yakunchikova's own interests, however, turned towards the fine arts. In 1882, following her sister Natalya's marriage to the landscape artist Vasily Polenov, his sister - Elena Polenova - also a fine artist, became a close friend. The Polenov residence was to become an important training centre for budding artists, and Yakunchikova joined as well, taking evening lessons with Elena between 1886 and 1889. Here she met artists such as Isaac Levitan, Valentin Serov, Mikhail Nesterov and Konstantin Korovin, among others.

Beginning in 1883 she had private lessons in art with Nikolai Avenirovich Martynov, and from 1885 she studied as an external student at the Moscow School of Painting, Sculpture and Architecture.

In 1896, she married a doctor named Leon Weber-Bauler, who was studying at the Sorbonne at the time, and attached his name to hers from then until her death. Their first son, Stepan, was born in 1898.

== Career ==
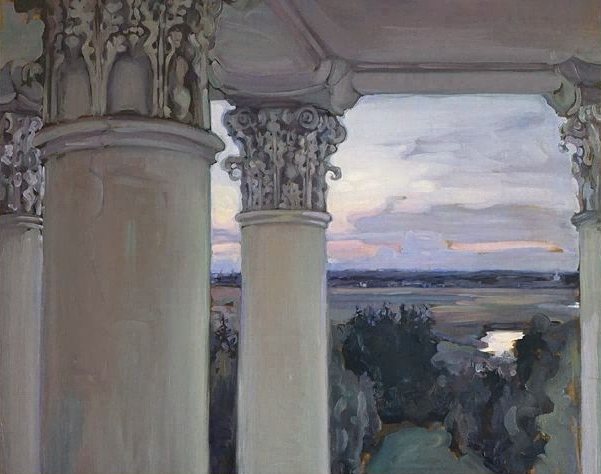
Columns in Vvedenskoye, 1894

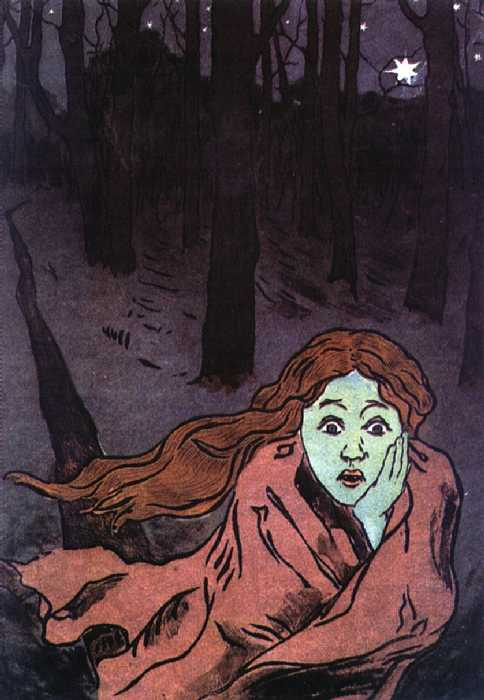
Fear, 1893

Yakunchikova was associated with the Abramtsevo artists, especially her teacher Elena Polenova, whose revival of traditional handicrafts inspired her to embroider and to execute pokerwork. Between 1887 and 1889 she began to collect folk art.

Landscape art remained her favourite genre, having been inspired to plein air painting by Polenova.

Yakunchikova traveled to Austria and Italy in 1888; the following year she went to France and Germany, and from then on worked mainly in western Europe. From 1889 to 1890 she attended the Académie Julian in Paris, studying under William-Adolphe Bouguereau and Tony Robert-Fleury. Here she painted natural scenes, and later exhibited at the Salon de Champ-de-Mars. She remained in Paris throughout the 1890s, except for occasional trips to Russia to recuperate and gain inspiration for her work.

Yakunchikova can easily be considered the first Russian artist of her generation to organically meld into the European context; her cityscapes of Versailles and Paris are considerably earlier than the more famous ones of Alexandre Benois. Further, her cityscape Paris: Avenue Wagram and the Arc de Triomphe at Dusk (1892) romantically depicts the city under artificial lights, and anticipates Konstantin Korovin's famous cycle of paintings of the city by night and day.

In 1892 she began to create colored etchings. She also started off with the technique of burning of wooden panels, which could then be illuminated by oil paint.

In 1897 Yakunchikova began to illustrate books. The following year onwards she also designed textiles and toys. Also in 1898 she was commissioned by Serge Diaghilev to design a cover for his magazine Mir iskusstva; this was an Art Nouveau image, with folk art stylings, of a swan in a forest pool, and ran in 1899.

From 1899, Yakunchikova began exhibiting with the World of Art movement, continuing until her death. In addition, she directed the embroidery workshop at Abramtsevo from her teacher's death in 1898, and planned an exhibition of folk art as part of the International Exhibition in Paris in 1900.

== Acclaim ==
In 1896, the art magazine The Studio wrote about her gravure work, acclaiming her brilliant temperament and great artistic gifts, superior to her master Eugène Delâtre in her realisation of the subject, in her idealism, her spirit and her imagination.

In 1900, Yakunchikova's large panel Little Girl and the Wood Spirits (mixed media involving embroidery and applique) was awarded a Silver Medal at the Paris World Fair. Her other major contribution to the exposition was the display of works by the koustari, traditional artisans, whose applied arts garnered much excitement.

Alexandre Benois wrote of Yakunchikova in 1901:"Yakunchikova is not only a great poet but also a great master. In Russia she is still insufficiently appreciated, and yet there are few contemporary artists - not only here, but also in the West - who wield such a fresh, noble palette, with such broad and vigorous skill."

In 1905, at the second Union of Russian Artists exposition in Moscow, Yakunchikova's posthumous exhibition was held. Five years later, Musée Rath in Geneva held an exhibition of her work.

== Later life ==
Yakunchikova suffered from tuberculosis, which had been diagnosed in the late 1880s. Her first son fell ill of the disease aged two, and although he survived, when her second son was born in April 1901, her health failed irreparably. To recuperate, her husband took the family to Switzerland. She died of the disease near Geneva in 1902.

Sergei Diaghilev wrote her obituary in the magazine Mir Isskustva:

"Yakunchikova's time was all too short for all the things she might have done. But in all that she had time to do, harassed by baby-napkins and the bustle of Paris, she revealed the depths of a lovely talent, a profound feeling and affection for our Russian forests, oh, so remote, 'those little pines and firs', which for her were instinct with religious feeling, and which she longed for all her life."
