= Algimantas Bučys =

Lithuanian linguist (b. 1939)

Algimantas Anicetas Bučys (born 19 September 1939) is a poet, prose writer, translator, literary theorist, historian and critic of Lithuanian literature, doctor of Humanities.

== Early life ==
Bučys was born in Kaunas, then the temporary capital of Lithuania. His father, Anicetas Bučys, began writing poetry while still a school student. His poetry was published in the press in interwar Lithuania (1918–1940), but at the end of World War II he found himself in exile in Britain. In London, he published plays and a book of poetry in Lithuanian, actively participated in the activities of the Lithuanian emigration in London and Bradford; for services to cultural activities elected to the British Union of Lithuanian honorary member, returned to Lithuania before his death (1998).

In 1957, after graduating from high school, Bučys enrolled at the University of Vilnius, where he studied the Lithuanian language and literature. After graduation, he was appointed a teacher of Lithuanian in the eight-year school of Bartkuškis, but also taught drawing and mathematics due to lack of teachers. At the same time, he wrote poems and critical articles on literature and published them in the Lithuanian press. In 1962, he published his first book of poems.

== Scientific specialization ==
In 1964, Bučys received an invitation from the Institute of the Lithuanian Language and Literature to finish postgraduate studies at the Gorky Institute of World Literature in Moscow. In 1968, he defended his thesis The Problem of the Novel in Contemporary Lithuanian Literature and earned the degree of candidate of philology.

At that time, the Gorky Institute paid particular attention to the literary theory and historical development of national literature. This research was associated with the revival of the ideas of Mikhail Bakhtin. In the book The Novel and Modernity (1973, re-edition 1977, in Russian, 1977), Bučys tried to apply the ideas of Bakhtin as far as possible on the material of the Lithuanian novels of the Soviet period (1940–1970).

== Literary activity ==
In addition to works of literary criticism, Bučys has published two novels and four books of poetry. Since literary criticism was subject to the confines of Soviet ideology, Bučys turns to the more open-ended and multilevel medium of poetry. These are his "anti-moments”, as he says in the title of the present book. In his poetry "complex transmutations of object into spirit and spirit into object, the basic poetic principle remains the same: to fill reality physically with metaphors of thought and feeling for the purpose of giving real body and substance to the visions born in one's mind".

His poems have been translated into Polish, Russian, and Serbian. In turn, he had translated into Lithuanian poetry of the Polish poets Konstanty Ildefons Gałczyński, Julian Przyboś, Tadeusz Śliwiak, Bohdan Drozdowski, stories by the Serbian writer Grozdana Olujić, plays of the Croatian writer Miroslav Krleža and Polish writer Agnieszka Osiecka.

Creative work at home (1968–1998) from time to time was interrupted by work in various literary magazines of the Lithuanian Writers' Union (Bučys is a member of this union since 1968).

== International literary contacts ==
Interest in the problems of national literatures amplified many literary acquaintances and connections, particularly with writers of the Caucasus and the Baltic States, as well as participation in literary conferences abroad. Trips and performances in Poland (1979, 1980), Yugoslavia (1989 at the Congress of PEN International in Slovenia), Romania (1981), East Germany (1983 in connection with the preparation and preface to the collection of Lithuanian short stories in German), in the United States (1985 to meet Lithuanian writers in exile), Italy (1987 as a member of the Editorial Board at the journal Druzba narodov), West Germany (1990 together with Chinghiz Aitmatov, Daniil Granin, Alexander Men, Nikolai Anastasyev, etc.) was reflected in numerous literary articles. In 1962–2014, he published articles not only in Lithuanian, but also in Russian (84), English (4), German (4), Spanish (6) Polish (7), Estonian (2), Latvian (7), Armenian (3), Bulgarian (2), Georgian (1), French (2), and Japanese (1). ' Most of the articles present Lithuanian literature to foreign readers. One of the first (in 1969), Bučys began to write about the Lithuanian literature created in exile and banned in the Soviet Union; he prepared two volumes of the works of playwright, novelist Antanas Škėma, wrote the foreword to his novel Izaokas, first published in English. After the restoration of independence of Lithuania, Bučys wrote the first essay on the history of the Lithuanian literature, where emigration literature is presented as an organic part of a single national literature.

== Comparative literature ==
Since 2008, Bučys published three literary studies that emerged new methodological and cultural concepts.

Many years of close acquaintance with the writers of different nations and the works of various national literatures inevitably led to the need to find and develop new methods of studying the peculiarities of each national literature. Traditional comparative methodology, unfortunately, most often identified "similarity and resemblance" literary phenomena in different national literatures. It did not help to identify the individual identity of national literature, did not disclose its historical uniqueness. Structural comparison of very different historical experience of national literatures leads to the conclusion that the traditional "literary connections" represents only the outer side of the "invisible" internal typological interactions. A study similar ideological influence on national literature in the countries of the Soviet Union, the countries of post-war socialist camp in Europe has demonstrated the crisis of traditional comparative analysis by analogy. In these cases nothing is revealed except the statement that the monotony, the detection of the same trendy genre and stylistic standards in all of the compared national literatures (for example, a panoramic post-war novels in the manner of epic by Aleksey Tolstoy on the whole territory of the USSR and the Soviet bloc in Eastern Europe). In the discussion (1985 in Vilnius) Arthur Miller openly stated that the official ideology smooths the creative individuality of Soviet writers, "it becomes difficult to distinguish you. It is impossible to determine your personality".

== Cultural paradigms ==
A new concept Bučys gradually developed in the articles on various national literatures (Armenian, Georgian, Lithuanian, Latvian and Estonian), trying to prove that the traditional search of analogies in world literature often leaves out a proper evaluation of the most outstanding and original works of one or another national literature. That is, in his opinion, an unfortunate fate that is not deserved, for example, Lithuanian poet of the late 18th century Kristijonas Donelaitis or Croatian writer of the 20th century Miroslav Krleža. At the same time, Bučys began to form the concept of comparative literature in contrast, not only by analogy. The theoretical basis and possibilities of comparative literature to contrast he presented in different aspects in a special theoretical papers, the article "National identity and the global context", translated into several languages.

In 2009, there is a book "The ancient Lithuanian literature in the time of king Mindaugas", in which analysis of cultural conflicts in the collision of Lithuania in the 13th century is based on the prior experience of the analysis of the constant interactions of the "center" and "periphery". The paganism and Christianity in the book are perceived and studied as completely independent historical and cultural paradigms, as two civilizations, two systems of thinking and values, each of which is self-sufficient and fulfilled human being. The subtitle of the book "Polyparadigmatic research of the cultural conflicts in the Middle Ages" specifies the subject and method of research. According to the author, any attempt to analyze these conflicts within the framework of one individual culture or a certain religious paradigm would be fruitless. In each case the research will result in a dead end. If we choose a Catholic paradigm this will only allow us to deny or belittle the importance of a different paradigm, for example, Orthodoxy or Paganism, embodying polytheism. Thus the traditional method of comparatives is given a new direction of polyparadigmatic research, whereby cultural occurrences are compared not only by analogy, but also by contrast, without giving preference to any of the phenomena being compared. In the history of culture of Lithuania, unfortunately, is still dominated by traditional monoparadigmatic method of research with catholic hierarchization, continuing the line of the Polish historiography of the 19–20th centuries.

In 2012, Bučys published History and Anthology of Ancient Lithuanian Literature with 13 texts in Old Slavonic and Church Slavonic, most of them were sacred and were never presented in the context of Lithuanian culture. Among them – medieval “Vita of Vaishvilkas”, the son of king Mindaugas, who founded in the middle of the 13th century one of the oldest monasteries of the Greek rite on the bank of the Nemunas river, and other sacred texts, devoted to forgotten or completely unknown in modern Lithuania the Orthodox saints Charitina of Lithuania (died 1281) and Daumantas of Pskov (died 1299).

== Scholarly reception ==
According to Lithuanian literary critic and philosopher of culture Viktorija Daujotytė, ""here comes a very important idea in the book of A. Bučys: conflicts have arisen and arise from the fact that the world from the middle ages, and earlier, could not and cannot agree, cannot find a common language due to various approaches and a fierce desire for a single truth. The position of the author, tested and discussed, it seems reasonable: " "the true sacral base by its nature is not compatible with any mono-paradigm“; sacred nature lies deeper than reaches the dogma of “monopartism” in religion and in the humanities. But the strong position of the "powers that be" suppress other positions, other paradigms“. According to the author, „the chronicle of the medieval ages is not one text shows a belief that all that is outside of the Christian faith, this is the world of heretics“. In the book positively says about the work of Vladimir Pashuto "Formation of the Lithuanian State" (1959); for this study, research-informed, lets see how much untruth has been written about the beginning of the statehood of Lithuania. The author reminds about the work of Edward Said's "Orientalism" (1978); according to A. Bučys, „we can expect a study, which, in the tradition of W.Said's, consistently and deeply will reveal a long history of creating a negative image of Paganism in the Baltic countries and ancient Lithuania". „Wherever the right is considered a single paradigm, there to its limits is narrowed world“.

The principal of Bučys: the human world (worlds) is polyparadigmatic; it is what it is today, so it was in the Middle Ages. Comparative studies, as a humanistic strategy, are obliged to study the similarities and differences that stem from the same foundation“.

== Honors and awards ==
- 1972 – Award of the Union of Soviet Writers for the best article of the year about the native literature in the foreign press
- 1975 – State Prize of the Lithuanian SSR for the scientific work Romanas ir dabartis (The Novel and Modernity).
- 1982 – Pranas Libertas Literary Award for the novel Tik priešas tavo priešams (An Enemy to your Enemies).
- 1990 – Honored artist of the Lithuanian SSR
- 2000 – Award of the Open Lithuania Foundation and the Lithuanian Writers' Union for the best article of the year in the cultural press.
- 2010 – Lithuanian Government Culture and Art Prize for books Barbarai vice versa klasikai (Barbarians vice versa Classics; 2008), Seniausioji lietuvių literatūra. Mindaugo epocha (The Oldest Lithuanian Literature. The Era of King Mindaugas; 2009) and other recent works.
