= Nereditsa Church =

Church in Russia

Coordinates: 58°29′51″N 31°18′41″E

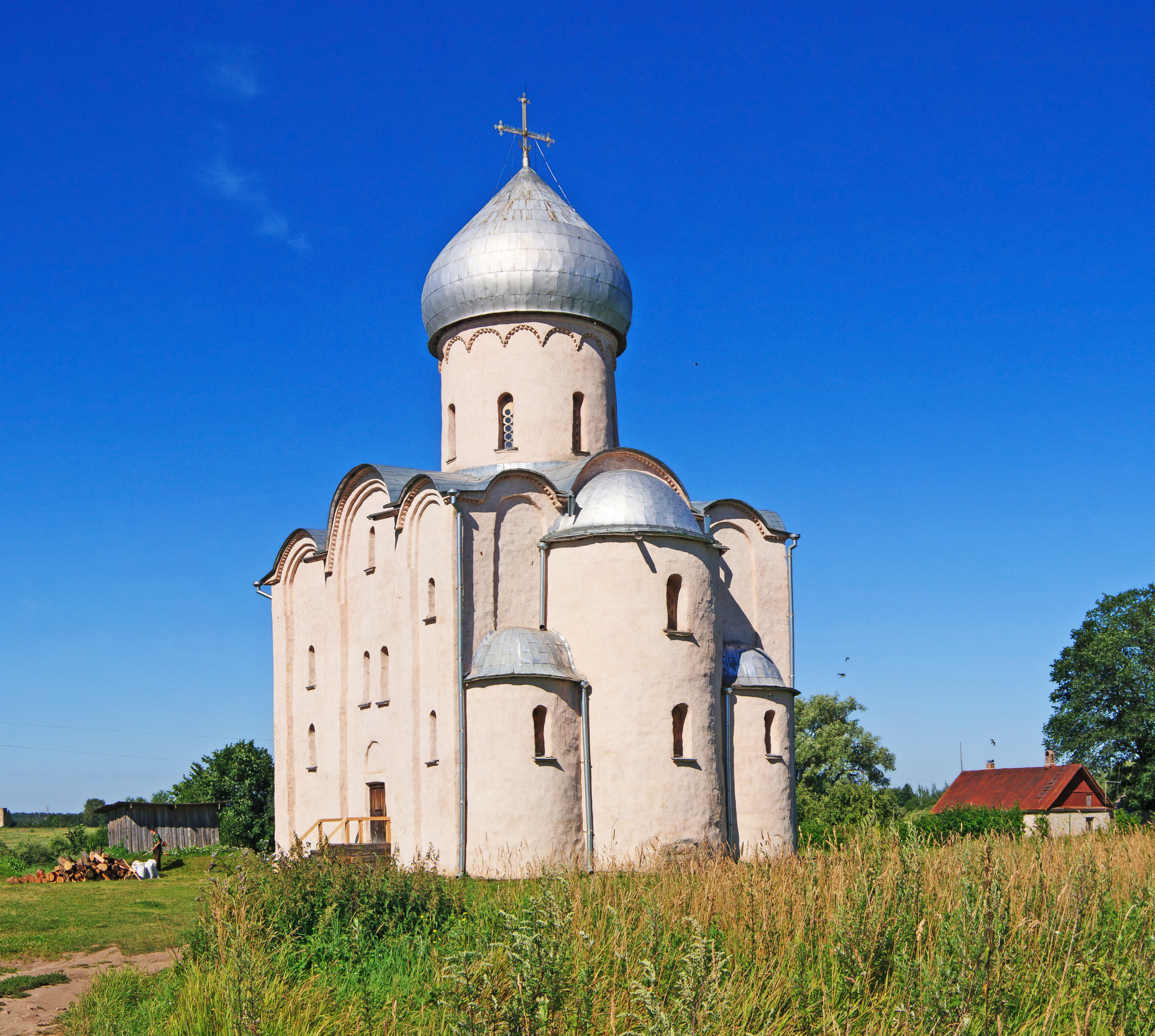
Spas-na-Nereditse Church in 2014

The Saviour Church on Nereditsa Hill near Novgorod (Russian: церковь Спаса на Нередице, Tserkov Spasa na Nereditse) is a 12th-century Orthodox church dedicated to the feast of the Saviour's Transfiguration.

The church, consecrated in 1198, became world-famous both for its remarkable state of exterior preservation and for the best preserved set of pre-Mongol wall paintings in the Russian Empire. During World War II it was selected as a target for artillery fire and was reduced to rubble.

The post-war reconstruction of the Nereditsa Church is on the World Heritage list as a part of object 604 Historic Monuments of Novgorod and Surroundings. The building has been designated an architectural monument of federal significance (#5310113002).

It is located in Novgorodsky District of Novgorod Oblast, Russia, 1.5 kilometres (0.93 mi) south of Veliky Novgorod in the village of Spas-Nereditsy on the right bank of the Maly Volkhovets River on the small Nereditsa Hill next to the Rurik hillfort.

== History ==
The church was built in 1198 by Prince Yaroslav Vladimirovich, the grandson of Mstislav Vladimirovich and painted with frescoes in 1199. It was measured and restored by Pyotr Pokryshkin in 1903-1904.

During World War II the church was located on the front line between 1941 and 1943 and was destroyed. It was subsequently restored. However, most of the frescoes could not be saved. They are currently known from pre-war photos, and watercolor sketches made by Nikolai Avenirovich Martynov in 1862.

== Architecture ==
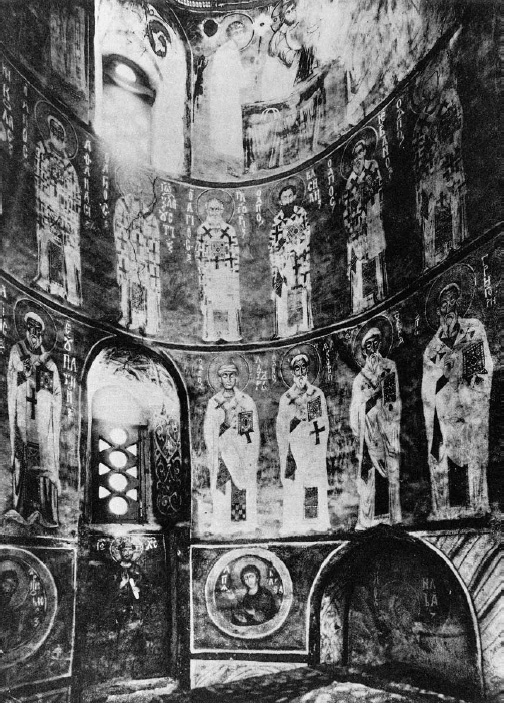
The interior was frescoed in 1199

The small stone church is built as a cube and has one dome. It is based on four pillars and has three apses at the eastern side. The type of a small church was developed in Novgorod in the end of the 12th century, and there are several churches of this type, in Novgorod and in Staraya Ladoga.

== Frescoes ==
The frescoes were created by eight to ten artists. They covered all the interior of the church, including the pillars, the walls, the ceiling, and the dome. There is no apparent system in creating the frescoes. It is possible that the painters did not know each other and had different styles. In particular, normally a fresco of Christ the Saviour should be painted in the dome. However, for the Saviour Church on Nereditsa, the dome was occupied by the Ascension. Christ was painted in the dome in the Byzantine Empire already in the 9th century, and painting other frescoes in the dome is a sign that the church belongs to a peripheral region. The most impressive fresco in the church was considered to be the Last Judgment, painted over the whole western wall. Only fragments of this fresco survive.

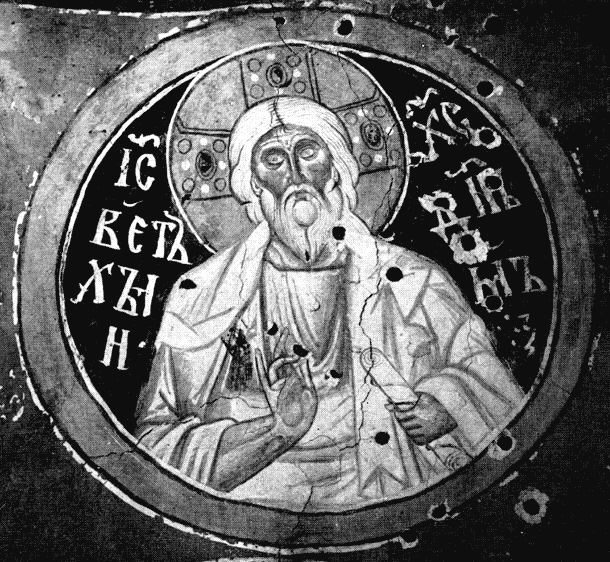

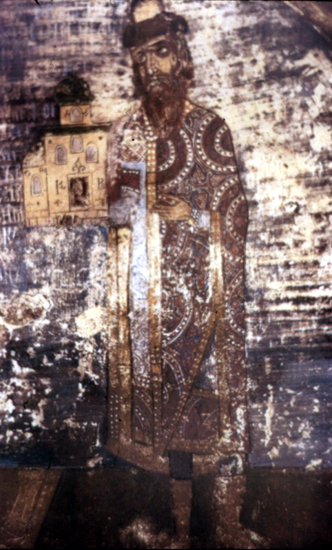
