= Zverin Monastery =

Coordinates: 58°32′09″N 31°16′34″E

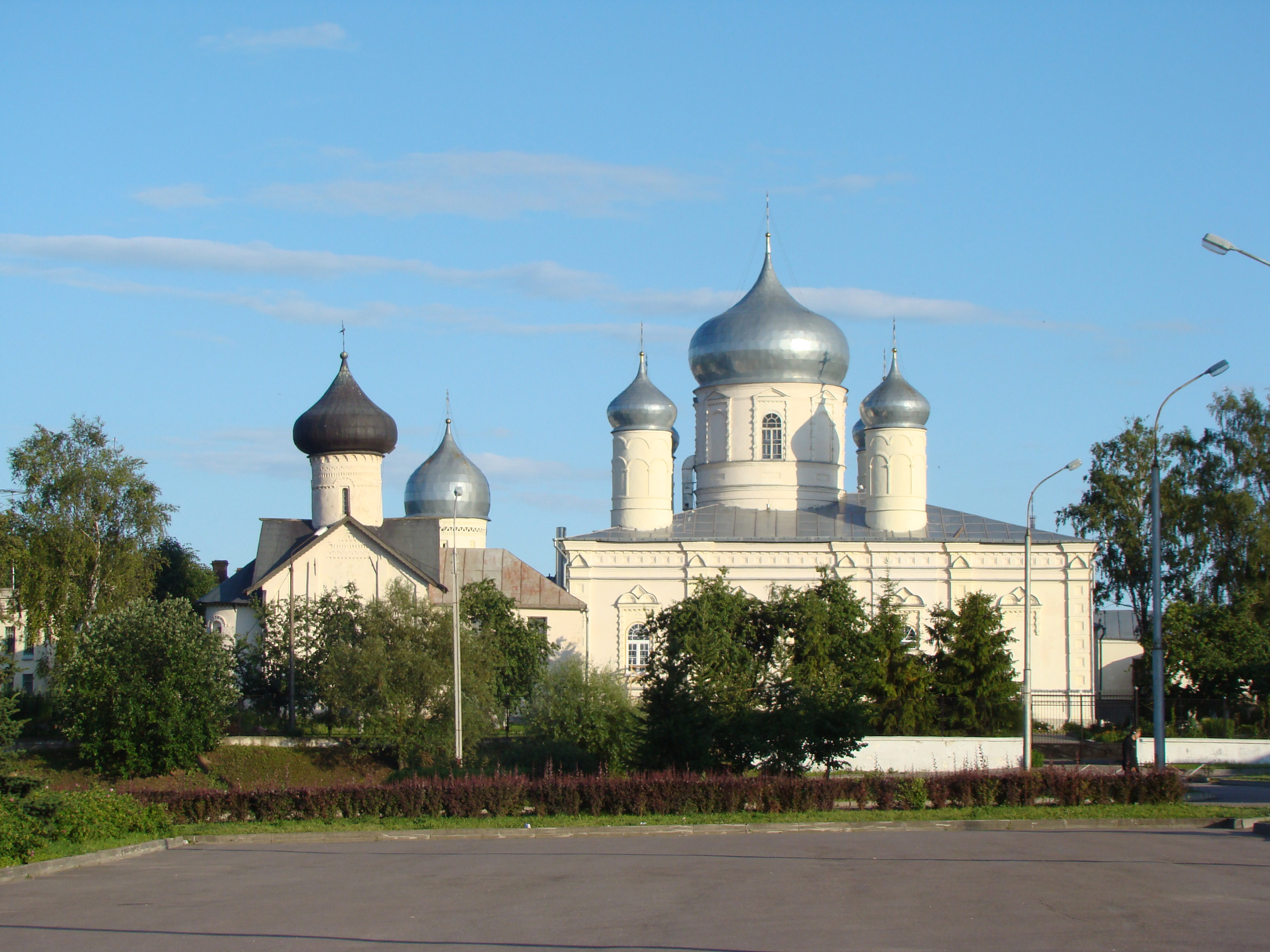
Zverin Monastery

The Zverin Monastery is a monastery in Veliky Novgorod, located on the left bank of the Volkhov River, north of the Kremlin. This is one of the oldest Russian monasteries, founded before the 12th century.

The Zverin Monastery is on the World Heritage list as a part of object 604 Historic Monuments of Novgorod and Surroundings. The building was designated an architectural monument of federal significance (#5310024000).

== History ==
It was first mentioned in the chronicles as a female monastery under the year 1148. By that time, the monastery already existed, and the wooden Intercession Church was destroyed by lightning. The name of the monastery, which derives from the Russian word зверь – a mammal – originates from Zverinets, a wooden area where the monastery was built. Zverinets is mentioned in the chronicles in 1069, but the monastery was still not built. Archbishop Vasily Kalika built a stone Intercession Church in 1335. This is the oldest building of the monastery which survived. The present stone Church of St. Simeon the God-Receiver was built in the monastery in 1467 on the site of an earlier wooden one, which was built in 1399. The stone church was built to commemorate victims of the plague.

Between 1611 and 1617, during the Time of Troubles, Novgorod was occupied by the Swedes, and the monastery was considerably damaged. In 1721, it was abolished as a separate entity and subordinated to the Syrkov Monastery. In 1727, it was re-established. Between 1840 and 1860, a wall was constructed, and in 1899–1901 the new Intercession Cathedral was built. In the end of the 20th century, about forty nuns lived in the monastery. In the 1920s, after the October Revolution, the monastery was abolished. The buildings were badly damaged during World War II. The restoration works started in the 1960s. Currently, the monastery hosts a seminary for the Novgorod eparchy.

== Architecture ==
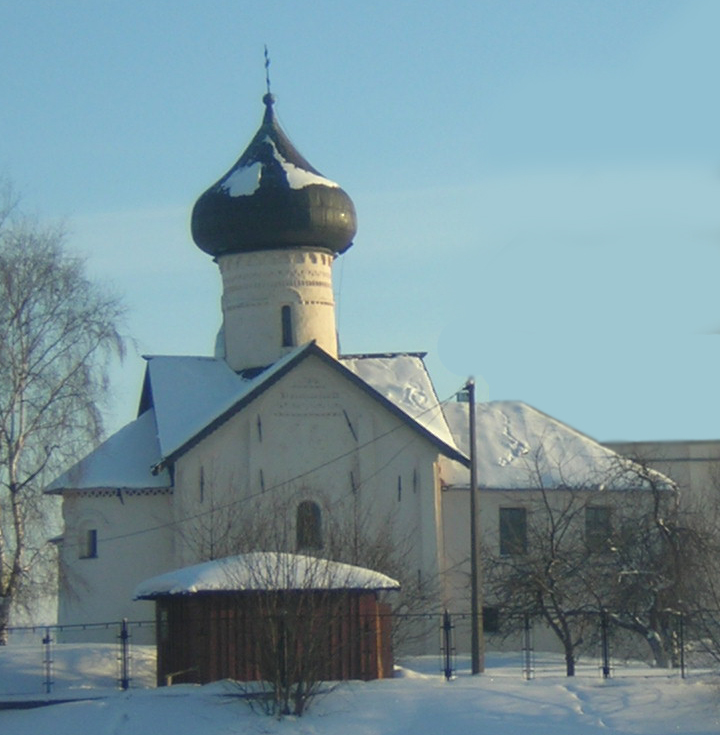
The Church of Saint Simeon.

The following three churches survived.

- The Church of Saint Simeon (Russian: Церковь Симеона Богоприимца), constructed in 1467, is a small church with one apse and one dome. In the 19th century, a secondary building was added from the western side of the church. Frescoes of the 15th century survived.
- The Intercession Church (Russian: Церковь Покрова Пресвятой Богородицы), built in 1399. Before 1399, the wooden church stood at the same place. Before 1682, the church was consecrated to the Holy Virgin. It was considerably rebuilt in the beginning of the 17th century, after the Swedes devastated the monastery, and again in 1899–1901, when the cathedral was constructed next to the church.
- The Intercession Cathedral (Russian: Собор Покрова Пресвятой Богородицы Зверина монастыря), constructed in 1899–1901 in the eclectic style. It is the tallest building in the monastery and has five domes.
