= Historic Monuments of Novgorod and Surroundings =

UNESCO World Heritage Site
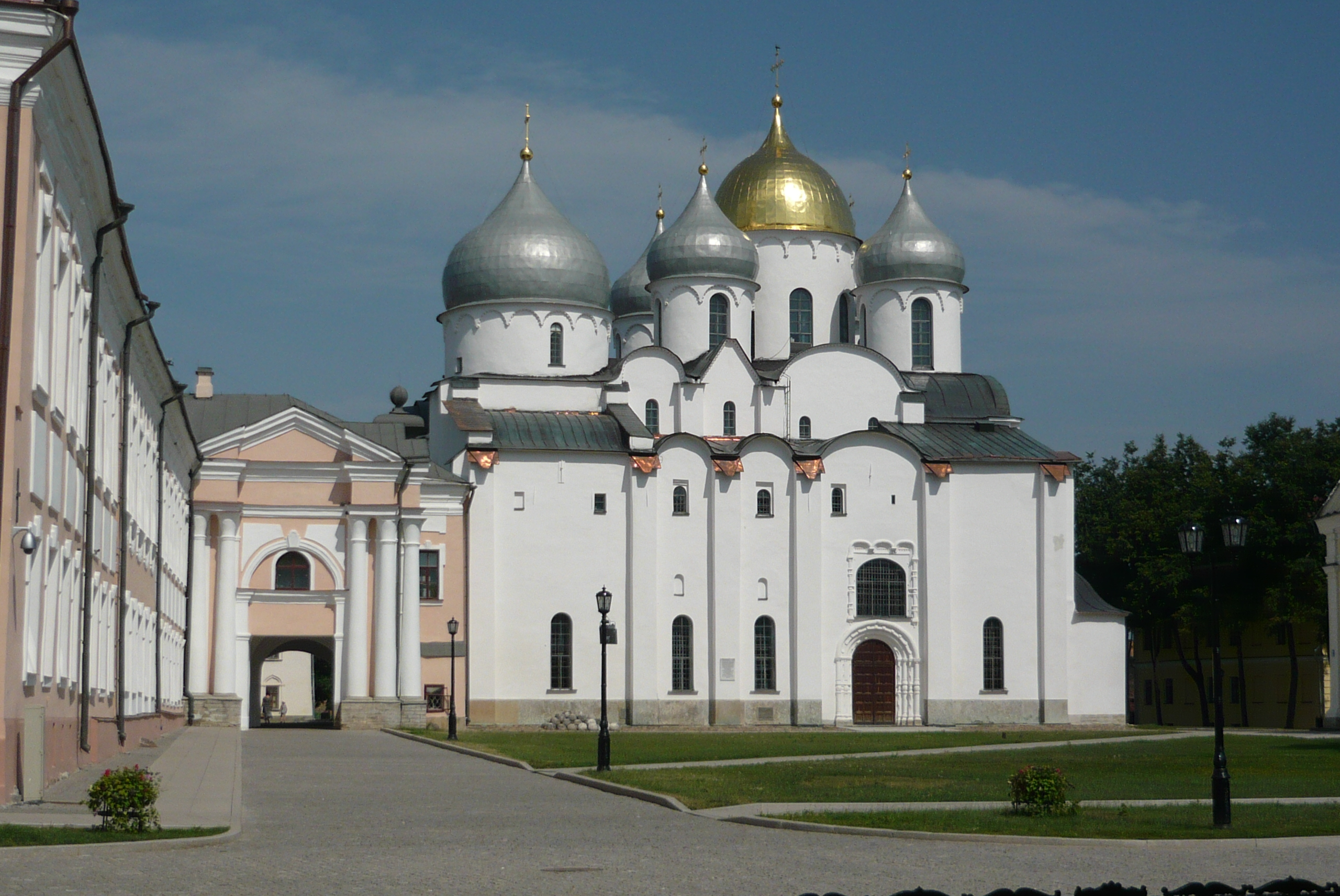
- The Saint Sophia Cathedral in Novgorod.

- Location within European Russia Location within Europe
- Location: Veliky Novgorod, Novgorod Oblast, Russia
- Includes: 1. Historic Centre of Novgorod (west) and the Novgorod Kremlin; 2. Historic Centre of Novgorod (east) with the Yaroslav's Court Cluster and Our Lady of the Sign Monastery; 3. Zverin Monastery and its environs 4. St Anthony Monastery; 5. Nativity of Christ Church in the Field; 6. Church of Our Saviour at Nereditsa; 7. Remains of the Annunciation Church at Gorodishche; 8. Peryn Monastery; 9. Yuriev Monastery; 10. Churches on Miachino Lake; St John the Alms Giver Church; Resurrection Church; 11. Sts Peter and Paul Church on Silnishche
- Criteria: Cultural: (ii), (iv), (vi)
- Reference: 604
- Inscription: 1992 (16th Session)
- Coordinates: 58°32′N 31°17′E

The Historic Monuments of Novgorod and Surroundings is a composite World Heritage Site which includes a number of medieval monuments in and around Veliky Novgorod, Russia. The site was inscribed in 1992.

== History ==
Novgorod between the 9th and the 15th centuries was one of the most significant cities of medieval Rus. It lay on the trade route from the Varangians to the Greeks and was the center of the Novgorod Republic, which included the major part of what is currently northwestern Russia. From the 12th century, it was an example of a medieval republic, in which decisions were taken by veche – a meeting of the city population – and the prince was elected. (The only other Russian city with a similar organization was Pskov.) Novgorod was one of few areas of Rus not affected by the Mongol invasions, and therefore, in particular, active ecclesiastical construction was continuing in Novgorod in the 14th century, while it was stale in the rest of Rus. Novgorod was as well the seat of archbishop and an important cultural center. The earliest known Russian manuscripts were produced in Novgorod in the 11th century. Russian whitestone architecture and Russian painting originated from Novgorod and Pskov. One of the most important Russian medieval painters, Theophanes the Greek, was active in Novgorod.

== Composition ==
The following monuments have been including to the site and are part of World Heritage, Many of the objects are operated by the Novgorod Museum Reserve.

1. Soil laid out between the 9th and the 17th centuries;
2. Chamber of Facets, officially listed as the ensemble of Novgorod Kremlin, 1433;
3. The ensemble of the Yaroslav's Court;
4. Ramparts and moat of the Okolny Gorod, 14th-16th centuries;
5. The Alexios Tower of the Okolny Gorod, 16th century;
6. The Saint Nicholas Church on Lipno Island, 1292;
7. The Nereditsa Church, 1198;
8. Ruins of the Annunciation Church in Gorodishche, 12th century;
9. The ensemble of the Peryn Skete;
10. The ensemble of the Antoniev Monastery;
11. The Saints Peter and Paul Church in Kozhevniki, 1406;
12. The Saints Peter and Paul Church at Slavna, 1367;
13. The Church of Theodore Stratelates on Shirkova Street, 13th century;
14. The Yuriev Monastery;
15. The Zverin Monastery;
16. The Trinity Church in Yamskaya Sloboda (14th century);
17. The Saint Blasius Church, 1407;
18. The Church of Saint Nicolas the White of the Saint Nicholas White Monastery, 1312-1313;
19. The Church of Twelve Apostles, 1454-1455;
20. The Annunciation Church at Lake Myachino, 1179;
21. The Saint John Church at Lake Myachino, 1422;
22. The Saint Thomas Church at Lake Myachino, 1463-1464;
23. The Church of Saint Peter and Saint Paul in Sinichya Gora, 1185-1192;
24. The Annunciation Church, 1553;
25. The Church of Saint Philip the Apostle and Saint Nicholas, 1526;
26. The Church of the Transfiguration on Ilyina Street, 1374;
27. The Saint Clement Church, 1520;
28. The Church of Demetrius of Thessaloniki with the bell-tower, 1462;
29. The Church of Theodore Stratelates, 1360-1361;
30. The Nativity Church on Krasnoye Pole, 1380;
31. The Znamensky Monastery;
32. The Trinity Church of Saint Spirit Monastery, 1557;
33. The Church of Saint Boris and Saint Gleb in Plotniki, 1536;
34. The Church of Saint John the Evangelist on Vitka, 1383-1384;
35. The Church of the Nativity of the Theotokos of Mikhaylitsky Monastery, 1379;
36. The Saint Michael Church, 1557;
37. The Saint Michail Church on Torg, 1300.
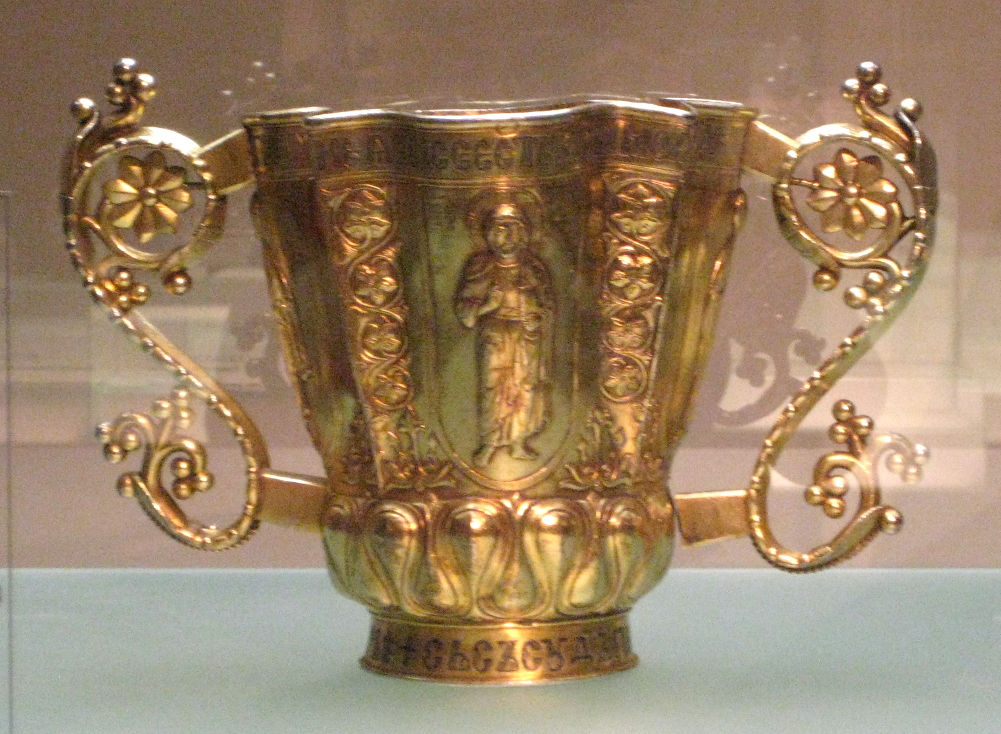

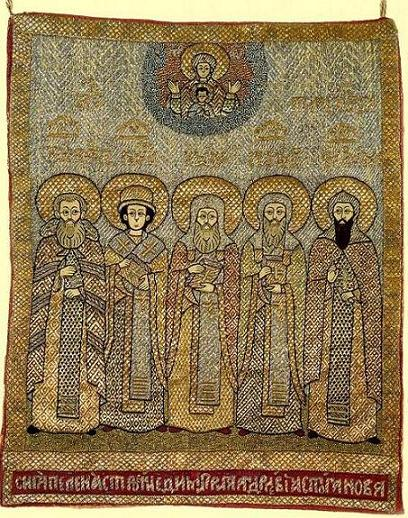

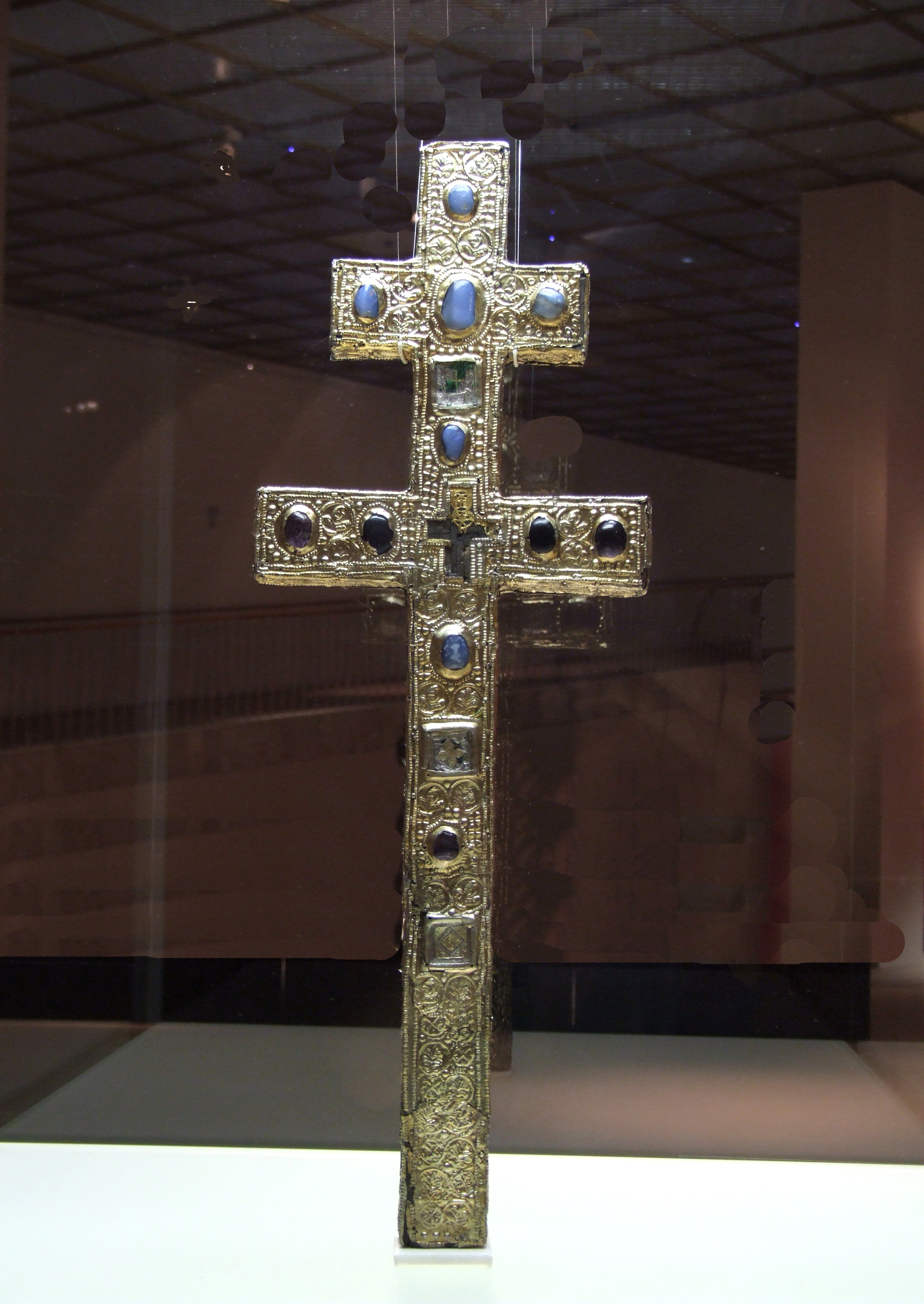

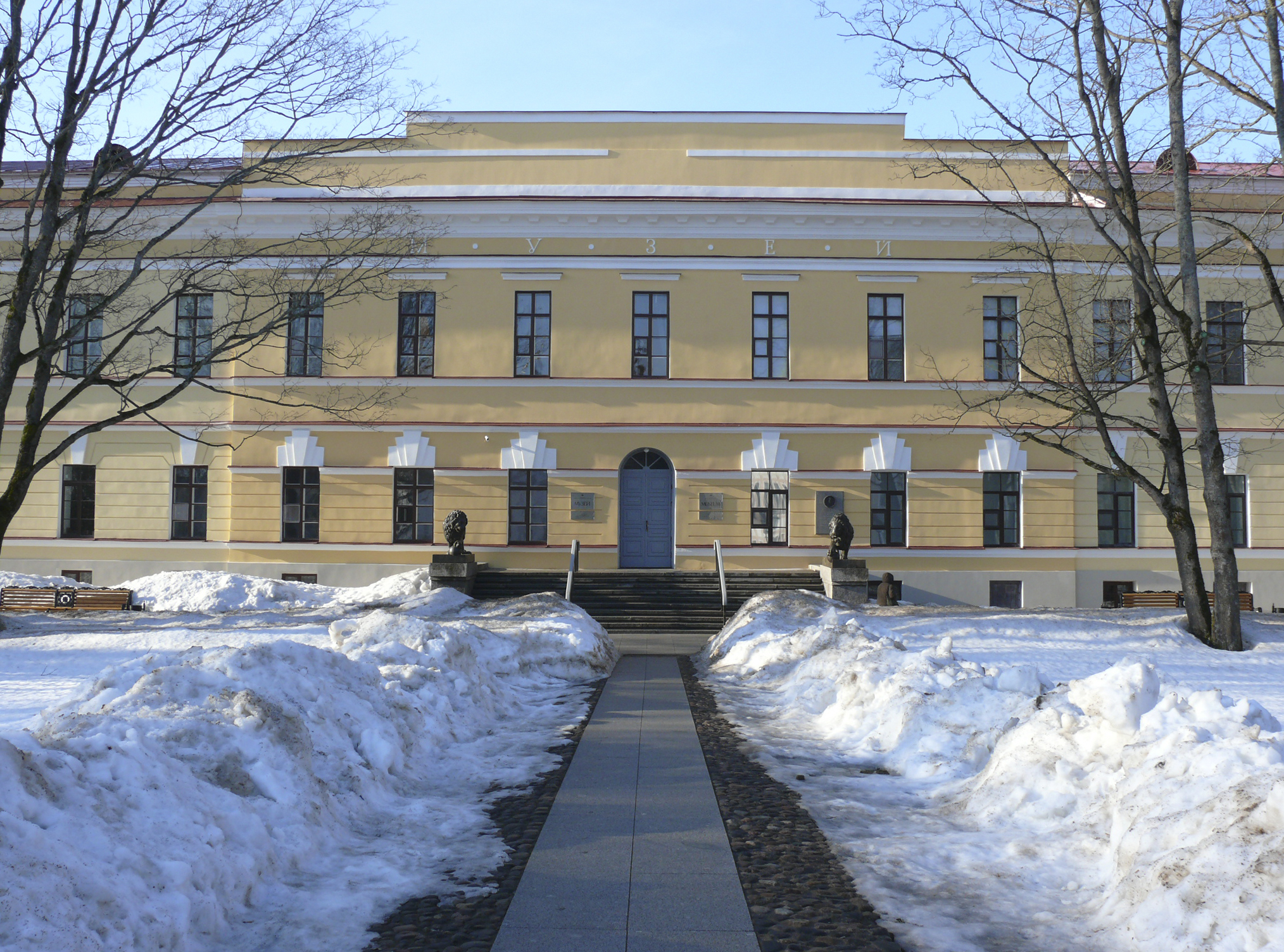

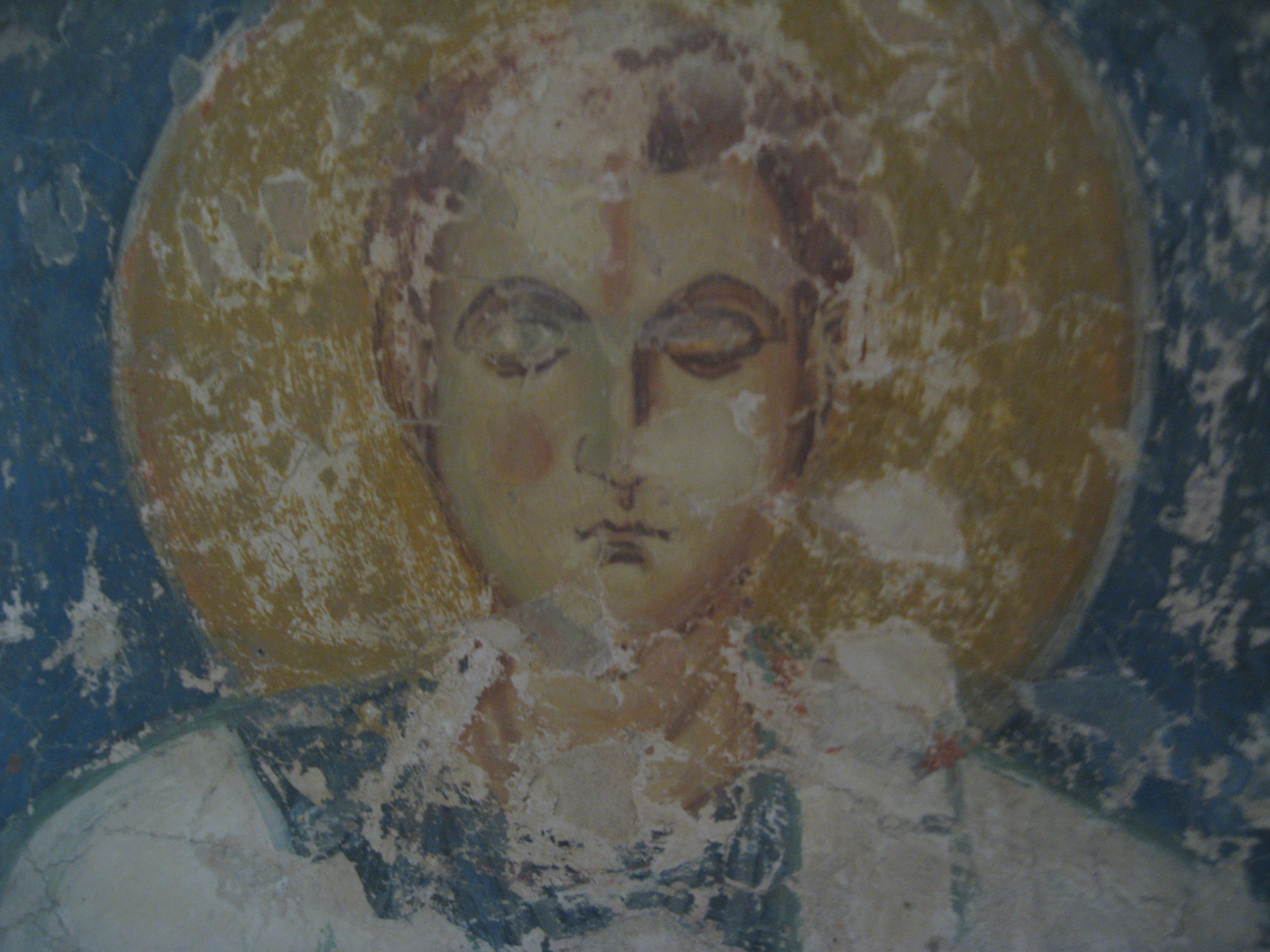
A 12th-century fresco from the Antoniev Monastery
