= Ivan Snegiryov =

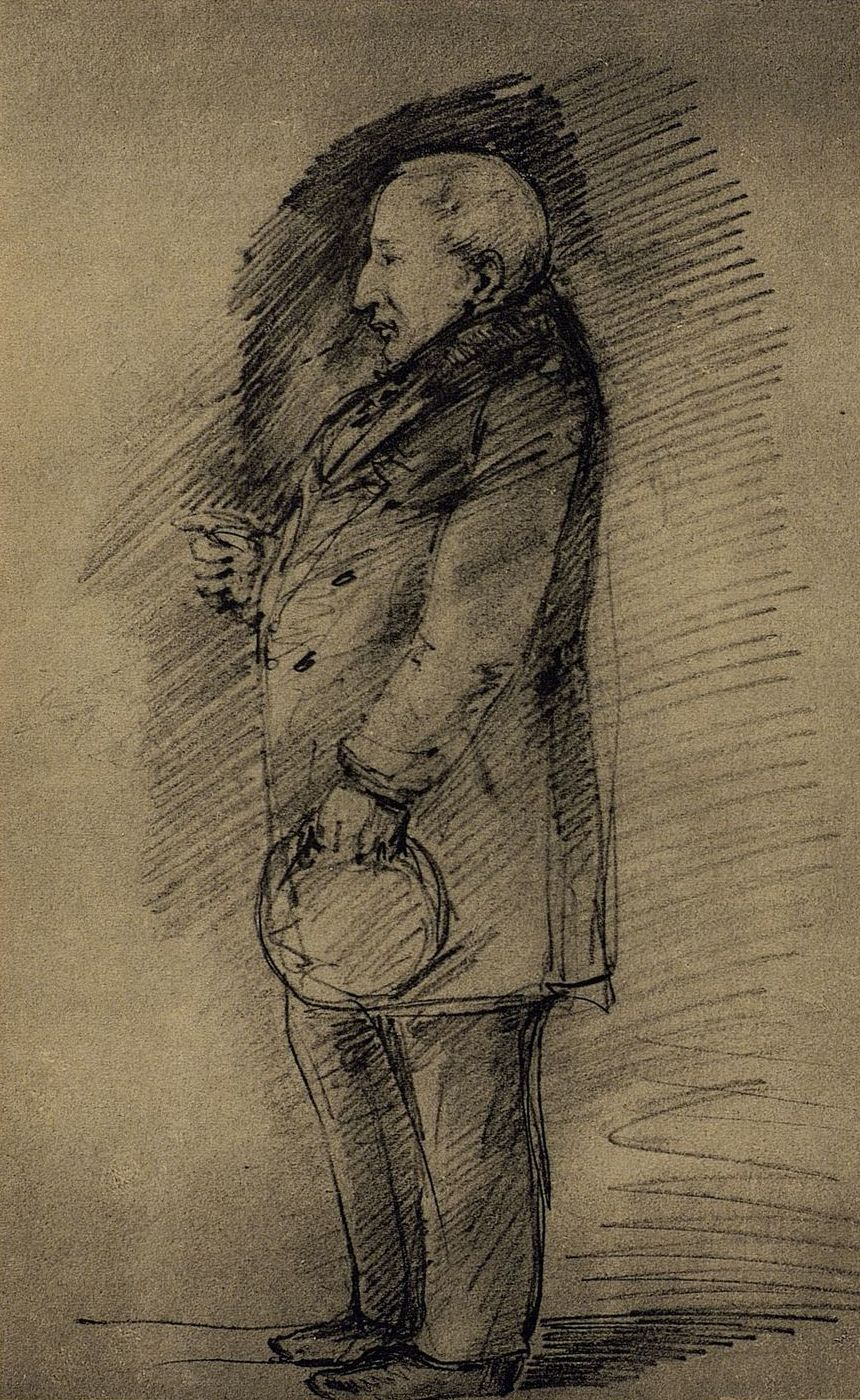
Portrait by Nikolai Avenirovich Martynov

Ivan Mikhailovich Snegiryov (Russian: Ива́н Миха́йлович Снегирёв; 1793, Moscow – 1868, Saint Petersburg) was one of the first Russian ethnographers. He published detailed descriptions of almost every church and monastery in Moscow.

The son of a university professor, Snegiryov graduated from Moscow University in 1814 and since 1818 taught Latin language there. He was active as a censor throughout Nicholas I's reign, censoring such works as Eugene Onegin and Dead Souls.

He shared the ideals of Official Nationality and belonged to a circle of antiquaries dominated by Nikolai Rumyantsev. He was one of the first to collect Russian proverbs and describe folk rituals and observances. His ground-breaking work on Russian lubok was printed in 1844.

Snegiryov's lengthy description of Moscow (1865–73) was feted by Fyodor Buslayev as the best guidebook to the city. He supervised restoration of the Kremlin buildings and the Romanov Boyar House. His journals were published in 2 volumes in 1904–05.

== Publications ==
Ivan Snegiryov authored several books on Russian proverbs, idioms, way of life, rituals and holidays:

- Russkie v svoikh poslovitsakh: razsuzhdenia i izsliedovania ob otechestvennykh poslovitsakh i pogovorkakh (lit. Russians in their idioms. Discourses and investigations about the national proverbs and idioms; 1831–1834).
- The common holidays of Russians and superstitious rites (1837–1839).
- Russian folk proverbs and parables (1848).
- On the lubok pictures of Russians (1844, second expanded edition published in 1861).

== Literature ==
- Vieillard, Stephane. 2014. Entre continuum et singularité: L'expérience d'Ivan Mixajlovič Snegirev (1793–1898), premier parémiologue russe moderne. Parémiologie. Proverbes et formes voisines, ed by Jean-Michel Benayoun, Nathalie Kieber, and Jean Philippe Zouogbo, III, 281–298. Sainte-Gemme: Presses Universitaires de Sainte-Gemme.
