= Tverdislav =

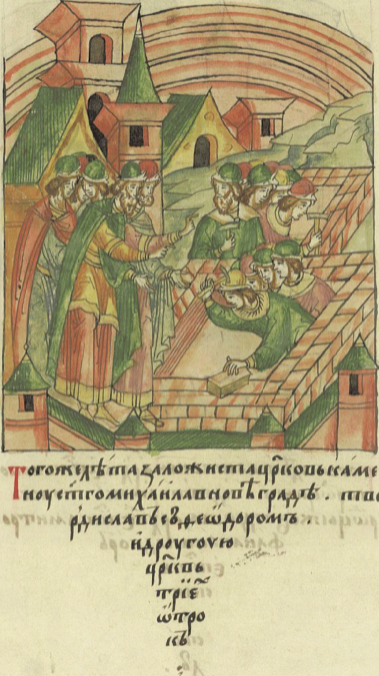
Tverdislav and Theodore lay the foundation of the Church of St. Michael

Tverdislav (Russian: Твердислав) was a posadnik of the Novgorod Republic in the 1210s. He first became posadnik around 1209. His term in office was marked by incessant civil strife, but its causes are not immediately clear.

== Life ==
His father was Mikhalko Stepanich, who was thrice elected to rule as Novgorod's posadnik. Tverdislav himself was first elected in 1209 and led the Novgorodians against Lithuania the next year. He then ceded his position to Dmitr Yakunin but was restored to office within three years. In 1214 he sided with Mstislav Romanovich against Vsevolod IV of Kiev, helping to dethrone the latter.

Tverdislav was subsequently accused by rival boyars of helping the ruling princes to stifle the republic in Novgorod. Mutual accusations between boyar factions broke into a civil war in 1218, when the prince declared Tverdislav's posadnikship over, but this act was deemed unlawful by all the parties and Tverdislav managed to retain his position.

A year later he was ousted from office but returned in 1220. On hearing about his return, the prince and two districts of Novgorod broke into open rebellion, but the archbishop effected a reconciliation between the warring parties, whereupon Tverdislav, pleading his illness and advanced age, renounced politics and took the tonsure at the Arkazhsky Monastery.

== Sources ==
- "Твердислав" . Brockhaus and Efron Encyclopedic Dictionary (in Russian). 1906.
