= Sts. Peter and Paul Church, Novgorod =

Church of Saint Peter and Saint Paul in Sinichya Gora
- Церковь Петра и Павла на Синичьей горе
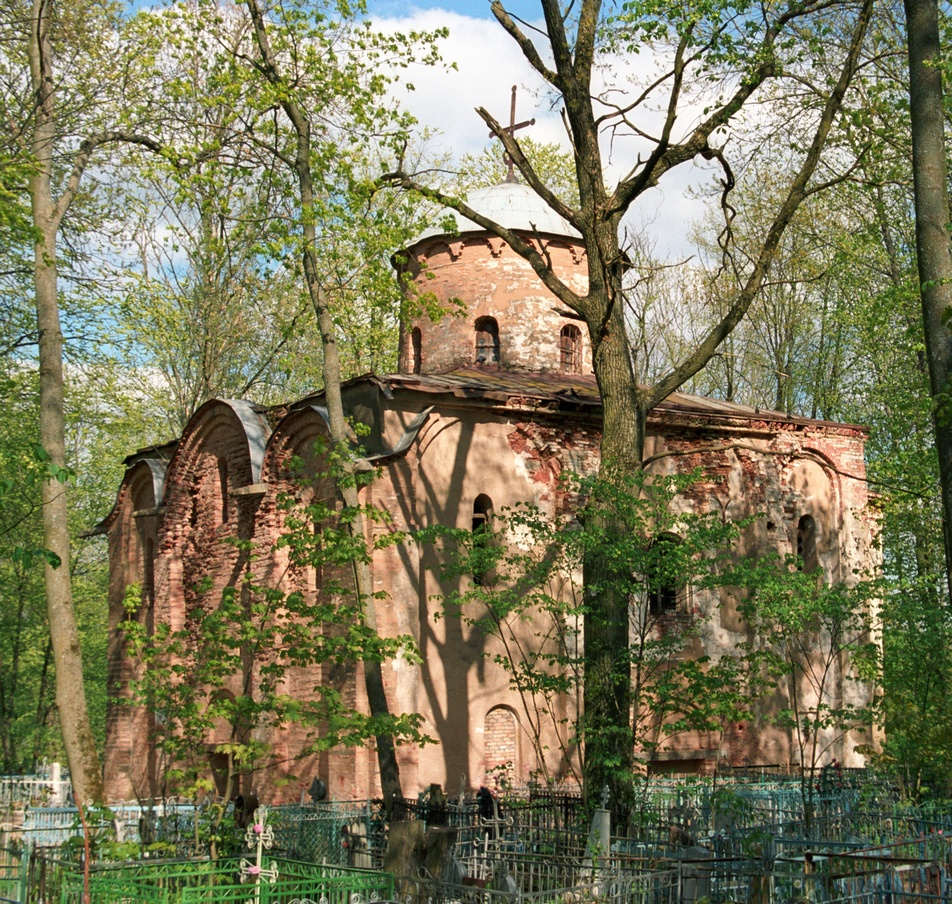
- Church of Saint Peter and Saint Paul in Sinichya Gora
- 58.50933°N 31.25886°E
- Location: Veliky Novgorod
- Country: Russia
- Denomination: Russian Orthodox

History
- Dedication: Saint Peter and Saint Paul

Architecture
- Style: Russian
- Completed: 1192

The Church of Saint Peter and Saint Paul in Sinichya Gora (Russian: Церковь Петра и Павла на Синичьей горе, romanized: Tserkov Petra i Pavla na Sinichyey Gore) in Veliky Novgorod is one of Russia's oldest churches, dating from 1192. The church is located at Saint Peter Cemetery, on the left (Sofiysky) bank of the Volkhov River, outside of the limits of the old city.

The Church of Saint Peter and Saint Paul in Sinichya Gora is on the World Heritage list as a part of object 604 Historic Monuments of Novgorod and Surroundings. The building was designated an architectural monument of federal significance (#5310038000).

== History ==
The church was built collectively by the inhabitants of the former Lukina Street, and was a part of the female Saints Peter and Paul Monastery. The monastery was plundered in 1611 by Sweden during the Time of Troubles and never recovered, finally being abolished in 1764. After the monastery was abolished, the church was converted into a cemetery church. It is the only surviving monastery building. It was closed for service in 1925 and fell into increasing dilapidation. Weather conditions in the area have played a major part in the degradation of the church. Novgorod frequently gets large amounts of snowfall, and the weight of the snow is detrimental to the structural integrity of the fragile components that were used in the original construction. Major structural damage was restored between 1961 and 1963, though currently it is undergoing a restoration.

There has been much controversy over the restoration progress of the Church of Peter and Paul. Little to no restorations have taken place since the ones that were made in the nineteen sixties, leaving the church in danger of frequent flooding, and water damage. These rough conditions have caused a lot of stress on the fragile structure. To help keep it standing, some layers of wooden scaffolding have been put in place to give it some added strength.

Community members have taken charge of the care and restoration of the church, and are working hard in order to preserve this long standing monument. Many petitions have been made to gain funding to help keep the structure standing, but most have been rejected up until this point.

== Architecture ==
The small stone church is built as a cube and has one dome. The type of a small church was developed in Novgorod in the end of the 12th century, and there are several churches of this type, in Novgorod and in Staraya Ladoga. The original structure had a bell tower that was later dismantled in 1934. Around this time, the main floor was split into an upper and lower level. The church is adorned with decorative patterns on the exterior. The south and west facades hold the most. Ornamental motifs of rosettes and eyebrow arches give a textural contrast to the main surfaces of the walls. These walls are constructed out of rough shell stone that was originally unstuccoed. Brick is also used for pilaster strips. The roof is made out of wooden shingles. These adornments along with the shape of the structure itself show the classic characteristics of Novgorodian architecture at the height of its revival in the late fourteenth century.
