= Nikolai Avenirovich Martynov =

Russian painter and watercolorist (1842-1913)

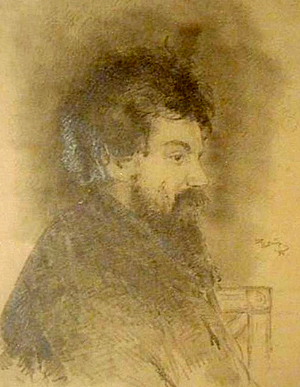
Nikolai Martynov; sketch by Ilya Ostroukhov (1884)

Nikolai Avenirovich Martynov (Russian:Николай Авенирович Мартынов; 1842–1913) was a Russian painter and watercolorist.

== Life and work ==
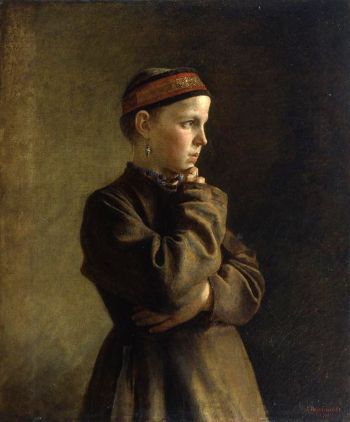
Peasant Girl from Tver

He graduated from the Moscow School of Painting, Sculpture and Architecture, and taught at various gymnasia in Moscow. In 1867, his watercolor renderings of the frescoes at Nereditsa Church earned him a bronze medal at the Exposition Universelle in Paris.

In the 1880s, he was a private tutor to the children of the Sabashnikov merchant family, including Mikhail Sabashnikov, who became a book publisher. While living at their dacha he wrote Курс рисования для средних учебных заведений» (A Drawing Course for Secondary Institutions). In 1883, he gave private lessons to the future graphic artist, Maria Yakunchikova, and her sister Vera. Mikhail Ezuchevsky and Nikolai Bartram were also his students.

In the 1890s, he was one of the first organizers of the Prechistensky "working courses"; free, general education, evening classes for adults. He was also a regular contributor to Russkiye Vedomosti. His memories of a visit with Leo Tolstoy at Yasnaya Polyana were published by them in 1891.

He lived and held classes in a large mansion owned by Viktor Nikolayevich Martynov (relationship unknown), an inspector of Caucasian and Crimean estates. Elizaveta Chebysheva, the wife of Nikolai Chebyshev, a lawyer and journalist, also taught classes there.

His works may be seen at the Tretyakov Gallery and the museum at the Abramtsevo Colony, with which he was associated. Several watercolors of birds are in the collection of the State Darwin Museum.

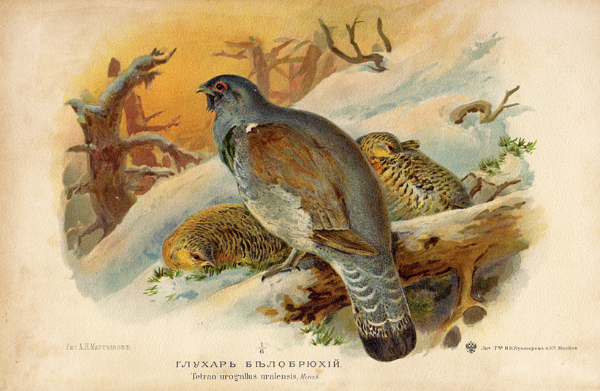
White-Bellied Capercaillie, from Hunting and Commercial Birds
