= Peryn Skete =

- Перынский скит
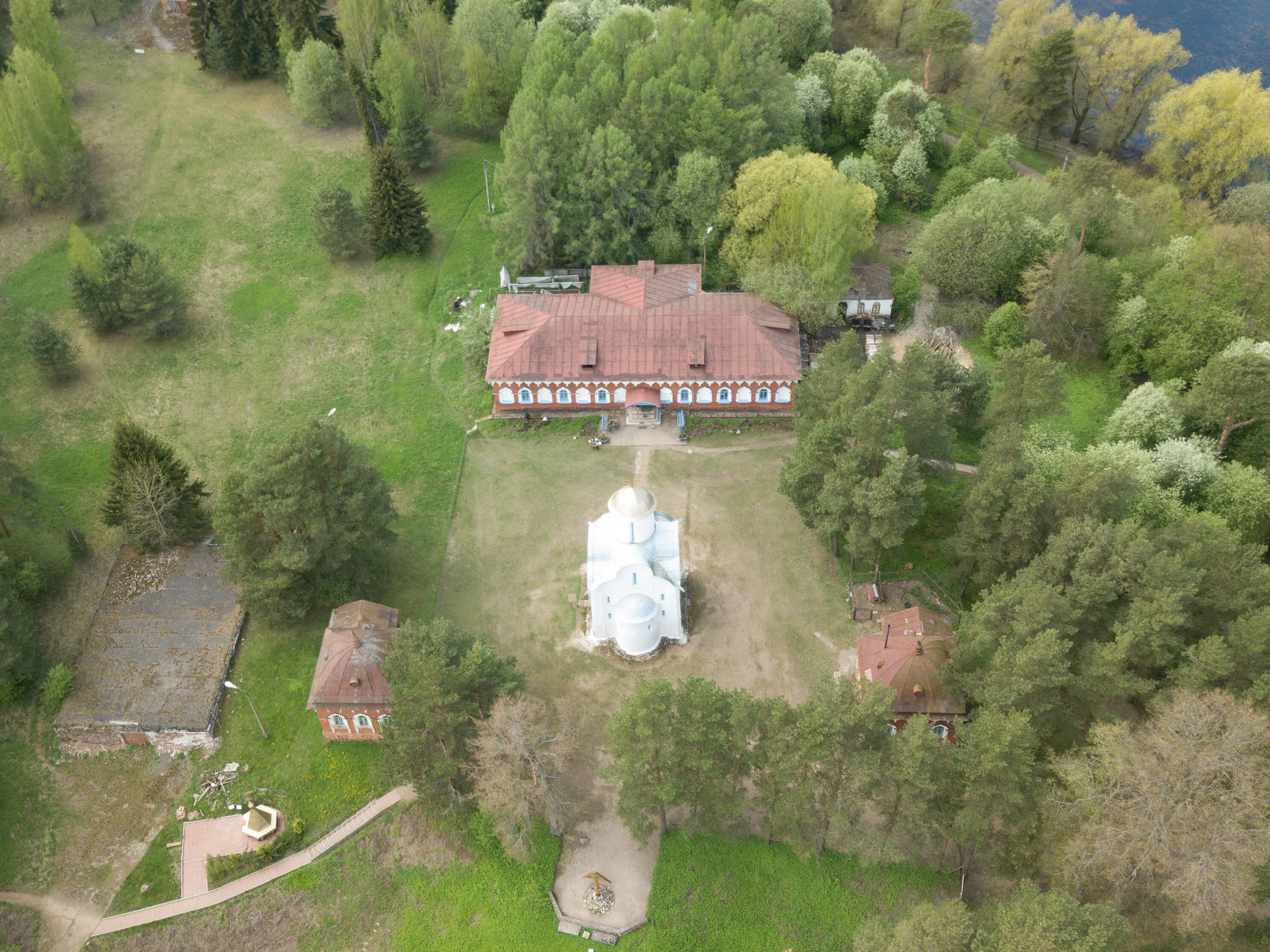
- Skete from a bird's-eye view, 2021.
- Interactive map of Peryn Skete

Monastery information
- Full name: The Nativity of the Theotokos Monastery in the Peryn Skete
- Denomination: Eastern Orthodox
- Established: in 1386 or earlier
- Disestablished: 1919
- Reestablished: 1991
- Dedication: Nativity of the Theotokos
- Diocese: Diocese of Novgorod
- Controlled churches: Church of the Nativity of the Theotokos

Site
- Country: Russia
- Coordinates: 58°28′22″N 31°16′25″E

UNESCO World Heritage Site
- Official name: Peryn Monastery
- Type: Cultural
- Criteria: ii, iv, vi
- Designated: 1992 (16th session)
- Reference no.: 604
- Region: Europe and North America

Peryn skete (Russian: Перы́нский скит, Perynskiy skit), Peryn skete of the Nativity of the Theotokos (Russian: Перы́нский Рождества́ богоро́дицы скит, Perynskiy Rozhdestva bogoroditsy skit) is a skete near Novgorod, Russia. It was built on the site of a former alleged place of worship of Slavic god Perun. The first mention of the monastery dates back to 1386. Over time, it was repeatedly destroyed and closed. It was reactivated in 1991.

The skete is included in the list of Russian cultural heritage register and the UNESCO's Historic Monuments of Novgorod and Surroundings.

== History ==
=== Pre-Christian times ===
The Novgorod First Chronicle states that in 980, Dobrynya, the voivode of Kievan Prince Vladimir, erected a statue of Perun on the upper reaches of the Volkhov. In 998, in connection with the adoption of Christianity, Dobrynia, together with the Bishop of Novgorod, Joachim, destroyed the temple, cut down the statue of Perun, and threw it into the Volkhov.

=== Further history ===
The monastery was probably founded in Peryn shortly after the destruction of the alleged pagan temple, when a wooden Orthodox church was reportedly built there. According to tradition, the wooden church was built in 995, but according to archaeological data, the limestone walls, tiles, and preserved frescoes date back to the 13th century, around 1220-1230 The first mention of the monastery in the chronicles appeared only in 1386. The chronicle states that the monastery was one of 24 monasteries burned down by the inhabitants of Novgorod so that they would not remain in the hands of the supporters of Dmitry Donskoy, Grand Prince of Moscow, who in 1386 rebelled against Novgorod.

The remains of the church were probably discovered by Vasily Sedov during excavations in a small northern chapel in 1952. The wooden Church of Holy Trinity was the second church built in Peryn. All wooden buildings were destroyed during the Swedish occupation of Novgorod in 1611–1617: the monastery was plundered. The 1617 inventory of Novgorod's property noted:

The monastery of the Virgin Mary in Peryn. The church of the Nativity of the Theotokos Monastery in the monastery has been destroyed. There are no cells or fences near the monastery. Old man Maxim is the only monk in the monastery. All his possessions, coming from God's grace [i.e., financed by donations], are a crucifix and five books.

In order to maintain and support the monastery after the destruction in 1611–1617, it was merged with the Yuriev Monastery (the main monastery of Novgorod). According to one source, this took place in 1634, according to another in 1671 After the secularization carried out by Catherine the Great in 1764, the monastery was closed down.

The monastery was restored to life in the 18th century thanks to Anna Orlova-Chesmenskaya and Archimandrite Photius. Archimandrite Photius, being a hieromonk in Saint Petersburg, rejected the idea of direct communication between man and God, outside the influence of the Church, which was popular at the time. He undertook a thorough renovation of the monastery of Yuriev and Peryn monasteries, with the financial support of countess Anna Orlova-Chesmenskaya, his wealthy goddaughter. Initially, Photius requested that the island of Peryn be returned to the Yuriev Monastery. After obtaining consent in 1824, he organized a thorough renovation of the church in Peryn: the walls inside and outside were thoroughly renovated, the interior of the church was refreshed, an extension was added on the west side, and the floor and dome were replaced.

The church was reconsecrated in 1828. The monastery was expanded in the 1830s and early 1840s: brick cells for monks and two small buildings for the abbot and archimandrite were erected, maintaining the same architectural style. The monastery was equipped with two farm buildings and surrounded by a brick wall; the complex was complemented by a bell tower.

In 1828, Photius managed to grant the monastery the status of a skete, a monastery with strict rules, isolated from the outside world.

The monastery was closed in 1919 and some of the buildings were demolished.

After the War, the monastery was converted into a sanatorium. In the 1960s, a dam was built connecting the island of Peryn with the mainland. This significantly changed the water regime, and the historic island became a peninsula, which only turned into an island during spring floods, and then into a hill.

In 1991, the monastery was handed over to the Church and reactivated as a skete of the Nativity of the Theotokos belonging to the Yuriev Monastery.

== Church of the Nativity of the Theotokos ==
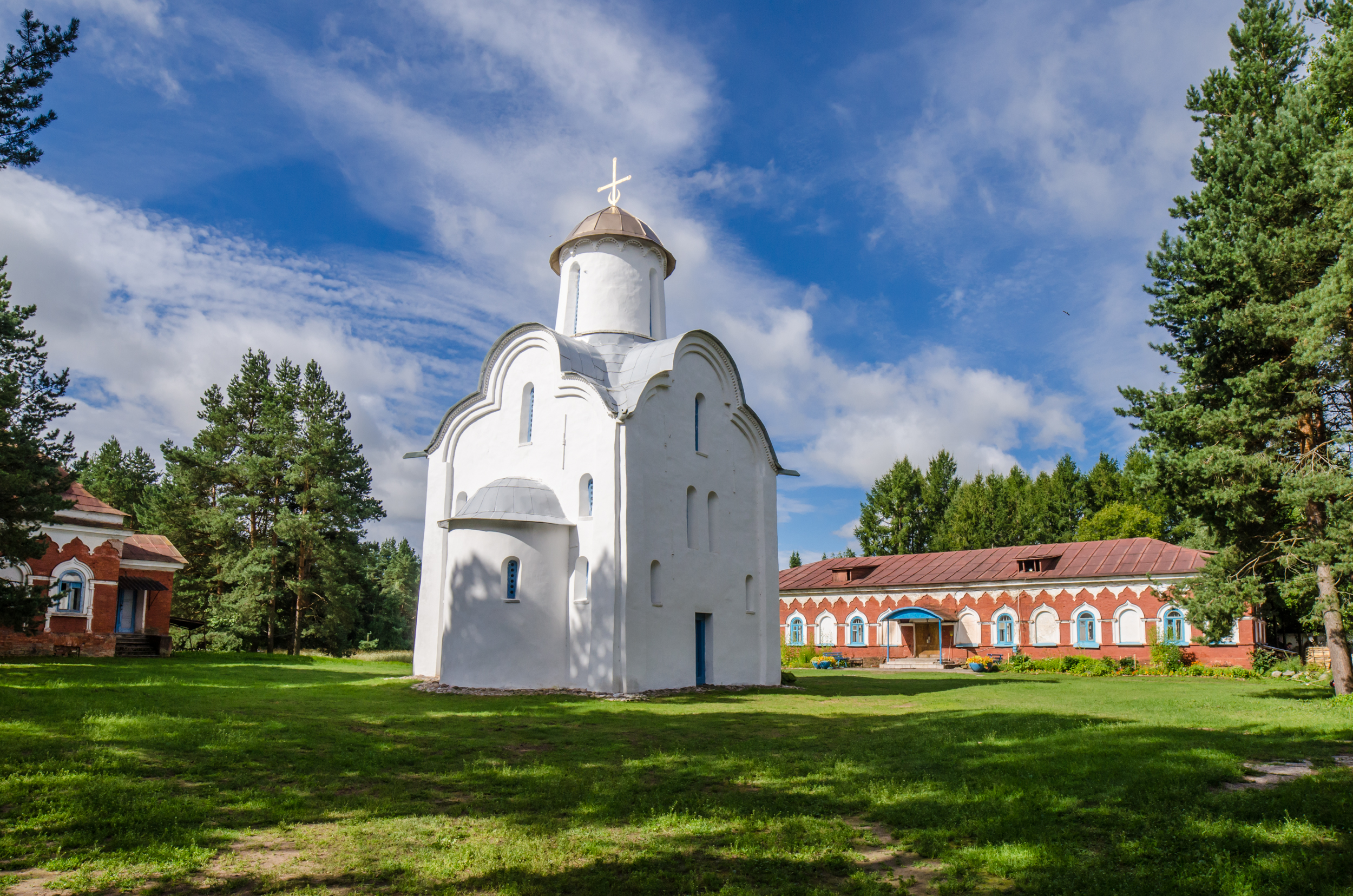
Peryn church

According to tradition, the wooden church was built in 995, but archaeologists claim that it was built in the first half of the 13th century, and historian Leonid Krasnorechev gives the date of 1226, when the election of the archimandrite of the church took place. It is one of the smallest churches in the Novgorod region.

== Gallery ==
Media related to Peryn skete at Wikimedia Commons

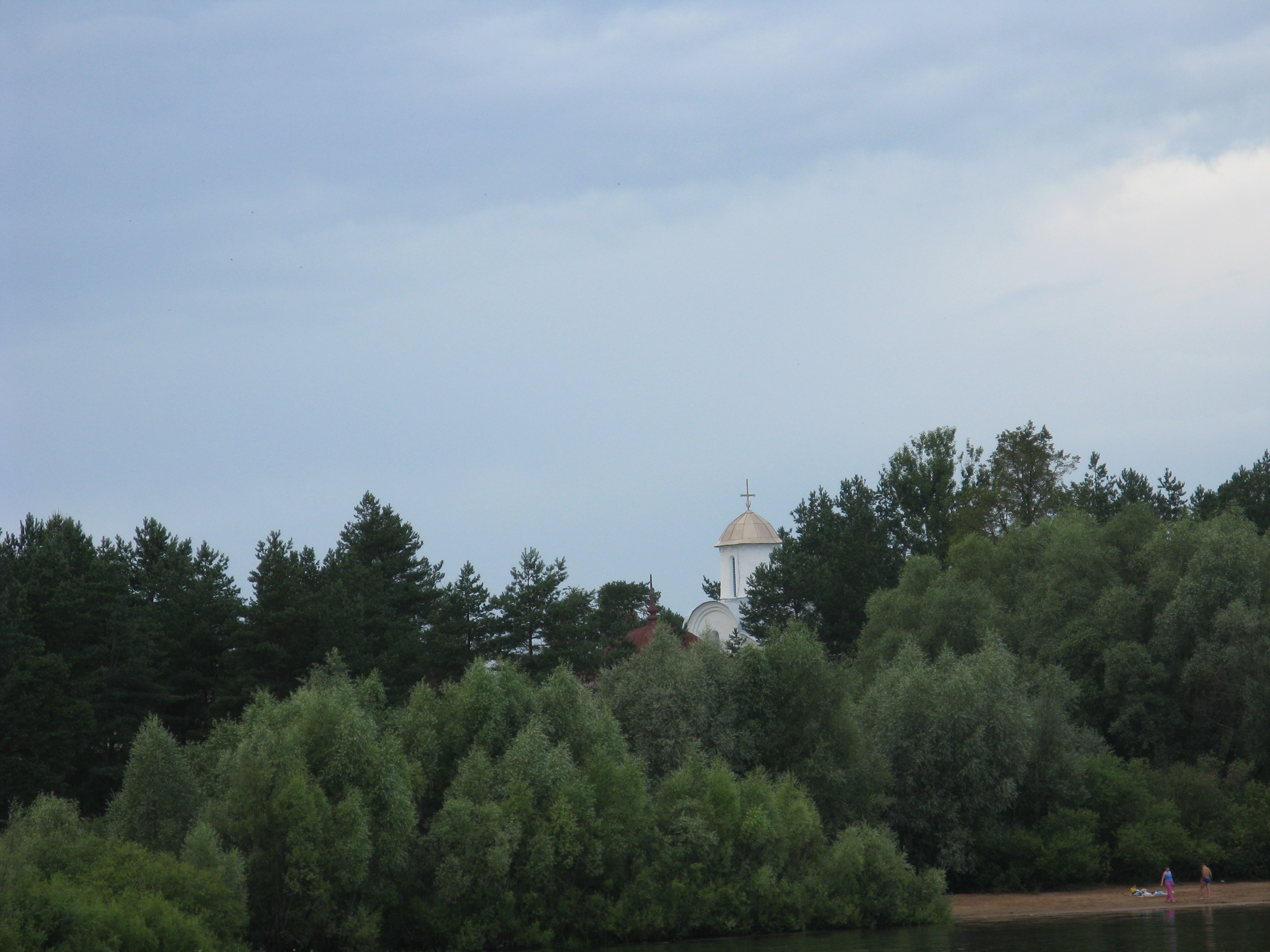
View of the skete church from the Volkhov River

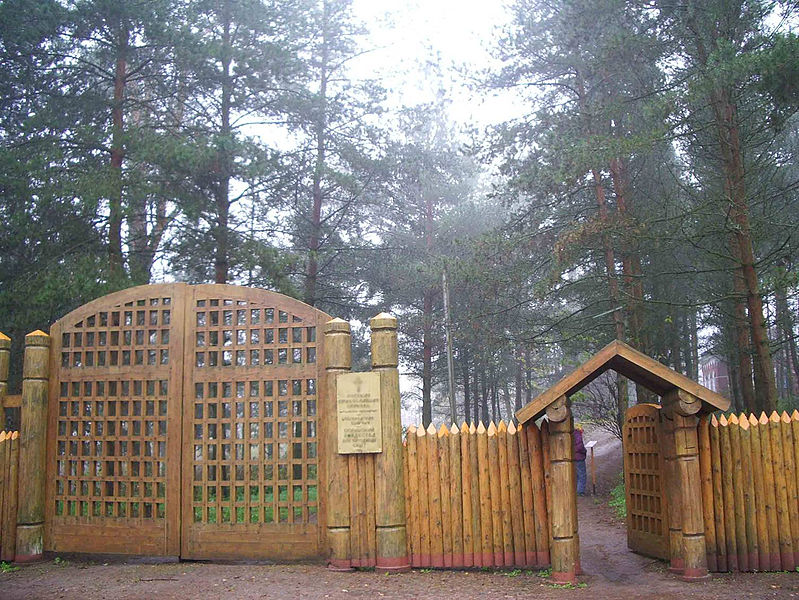
Gate of the skete

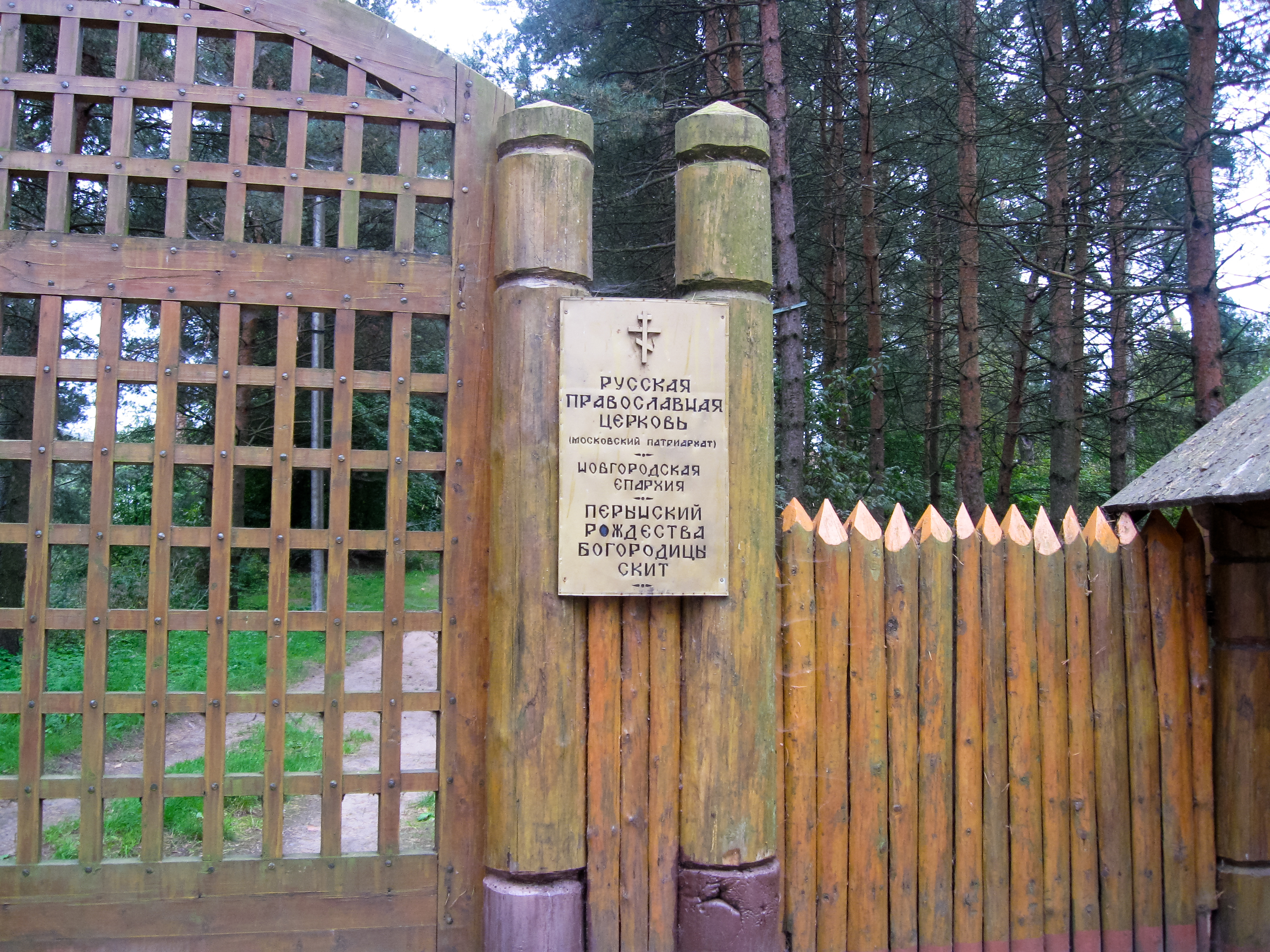
Board on the gate

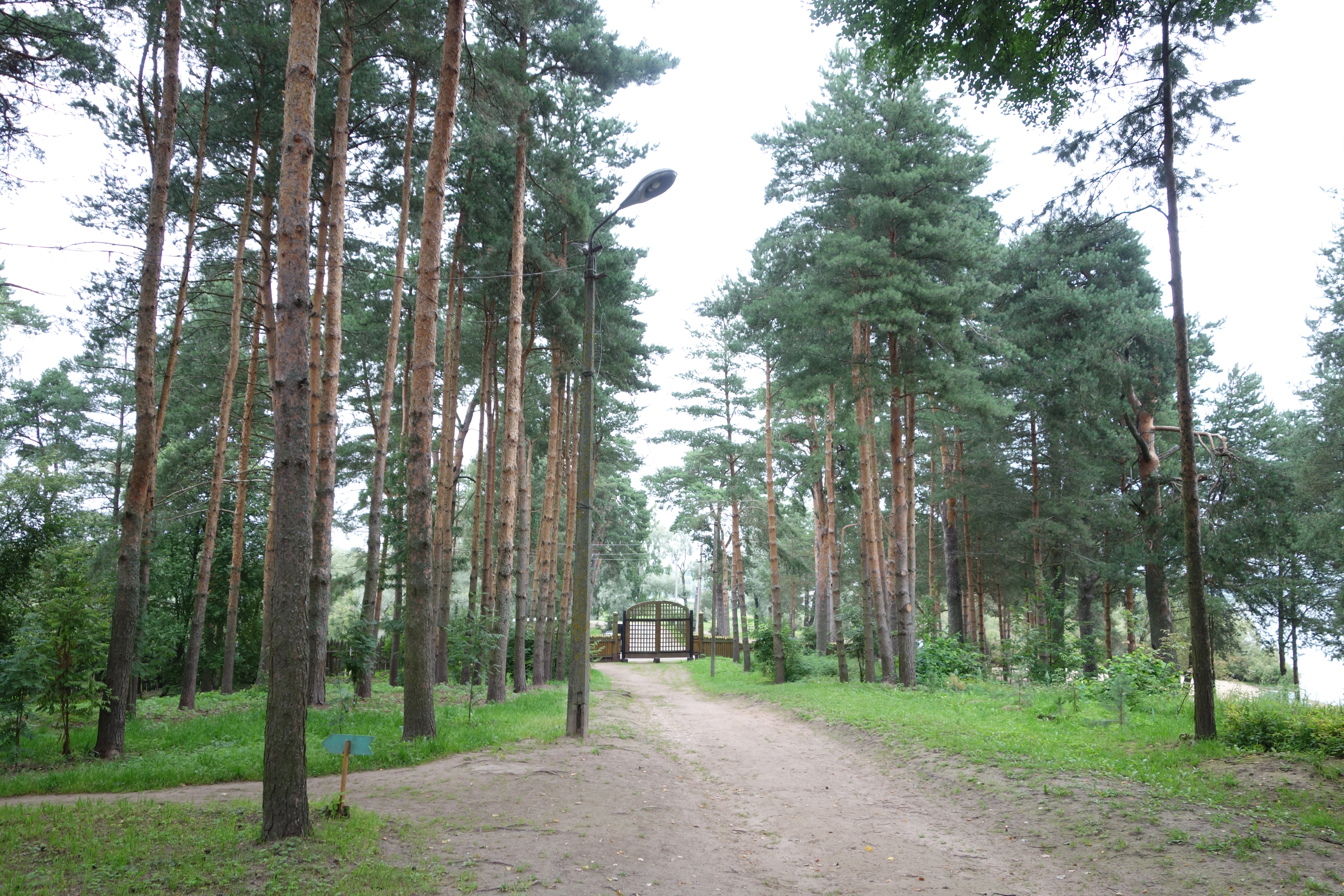
Internal road

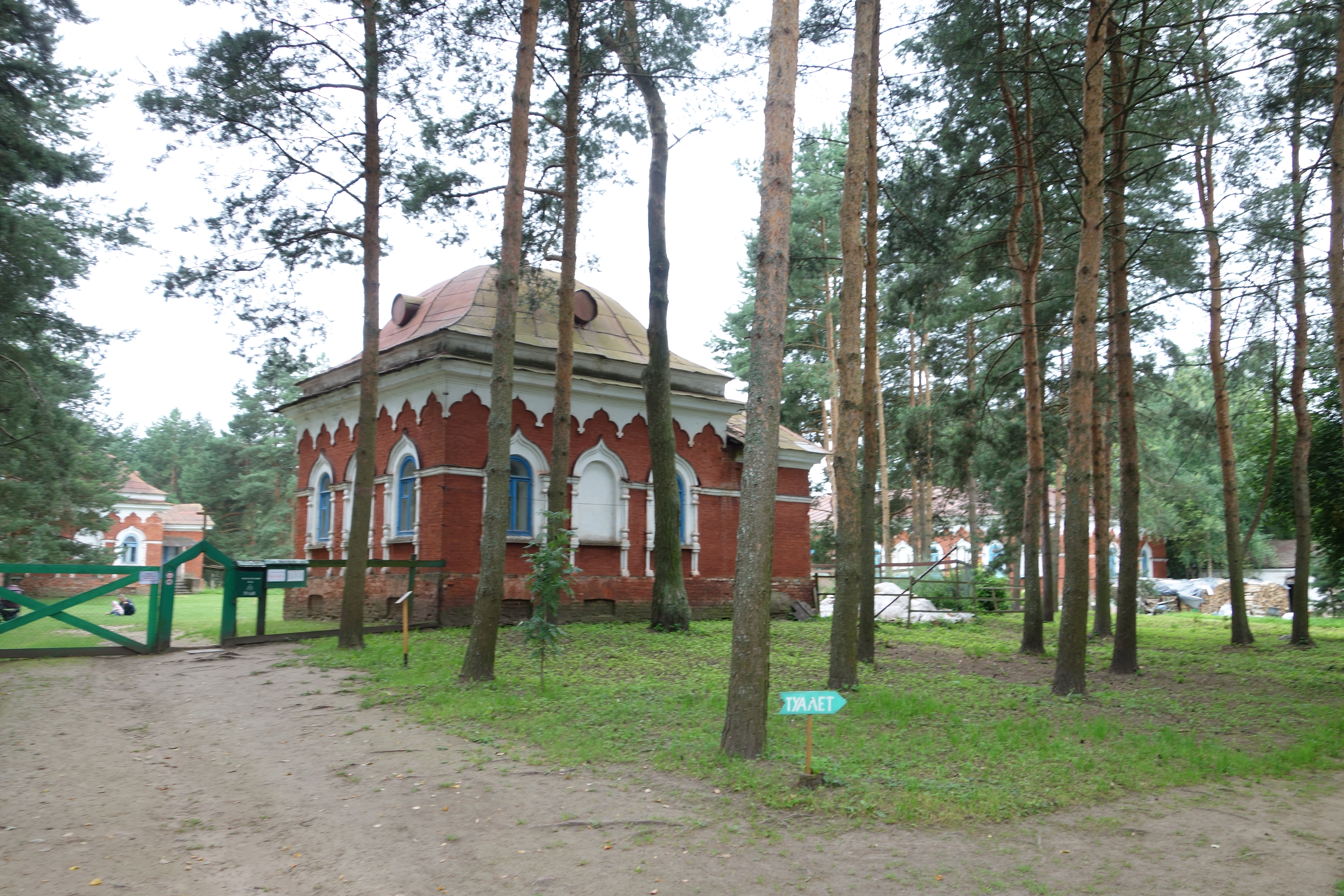
Entrance to the main part of the skete

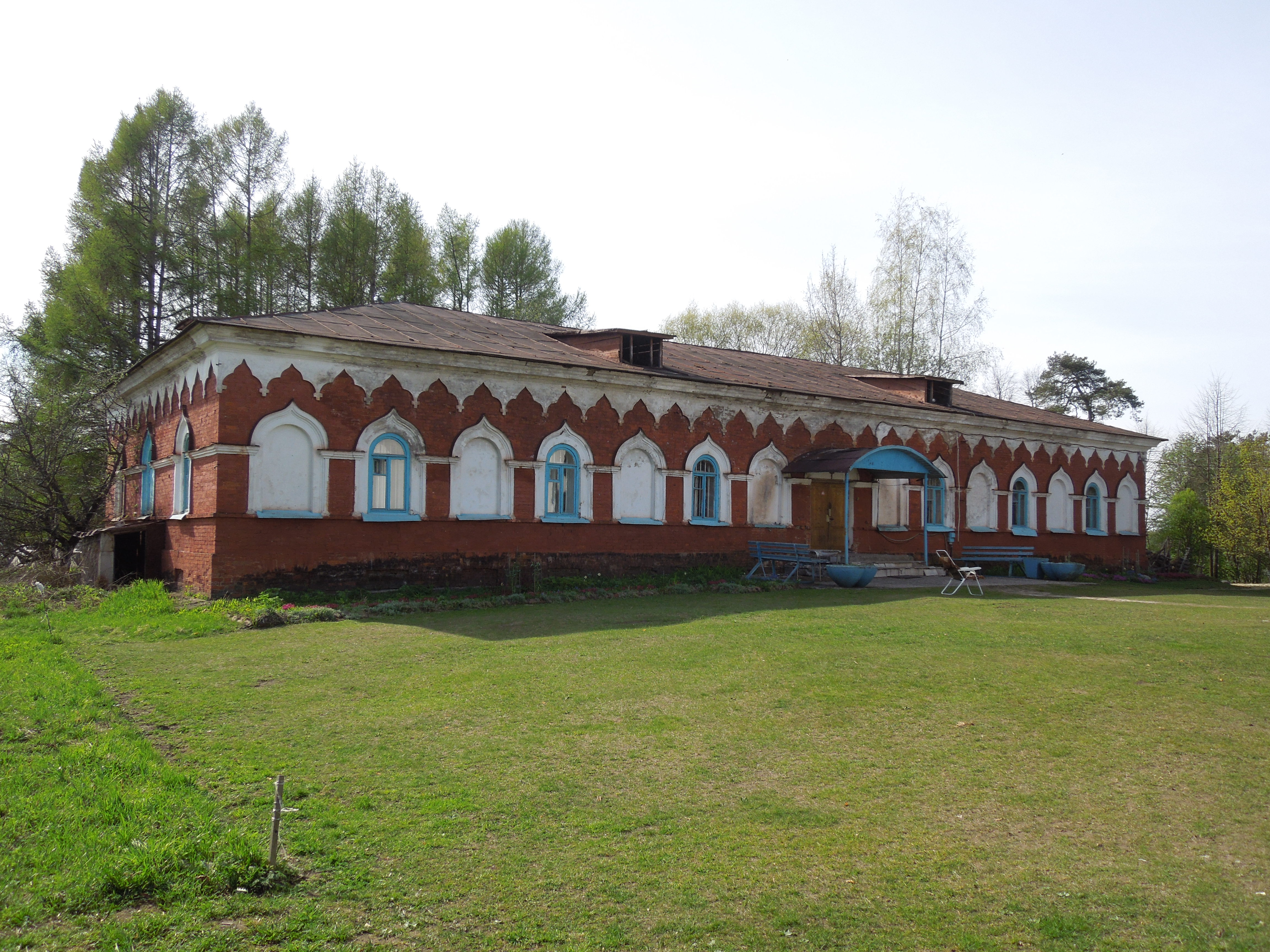
Western building

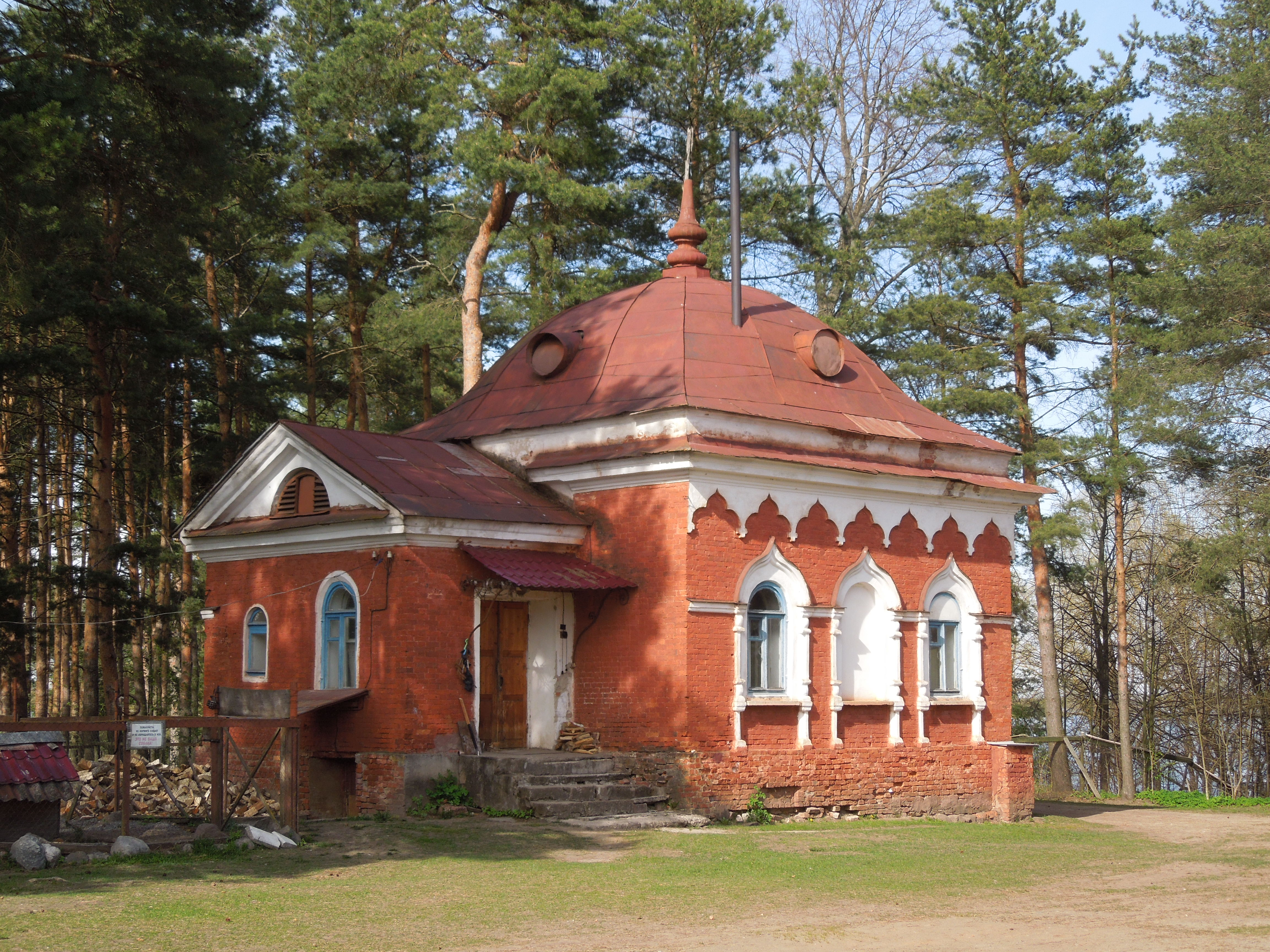
Northern cell

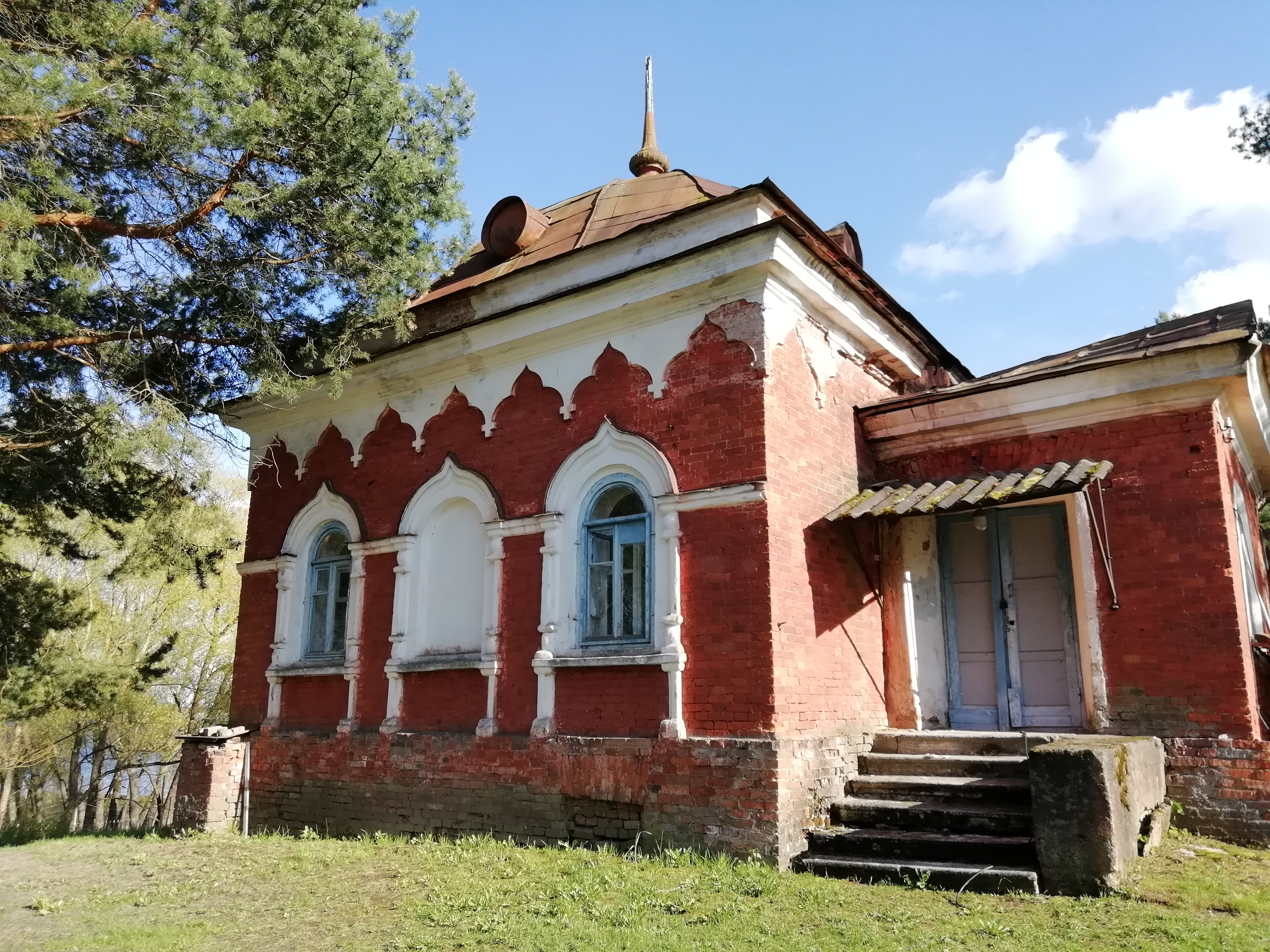
Southern cell

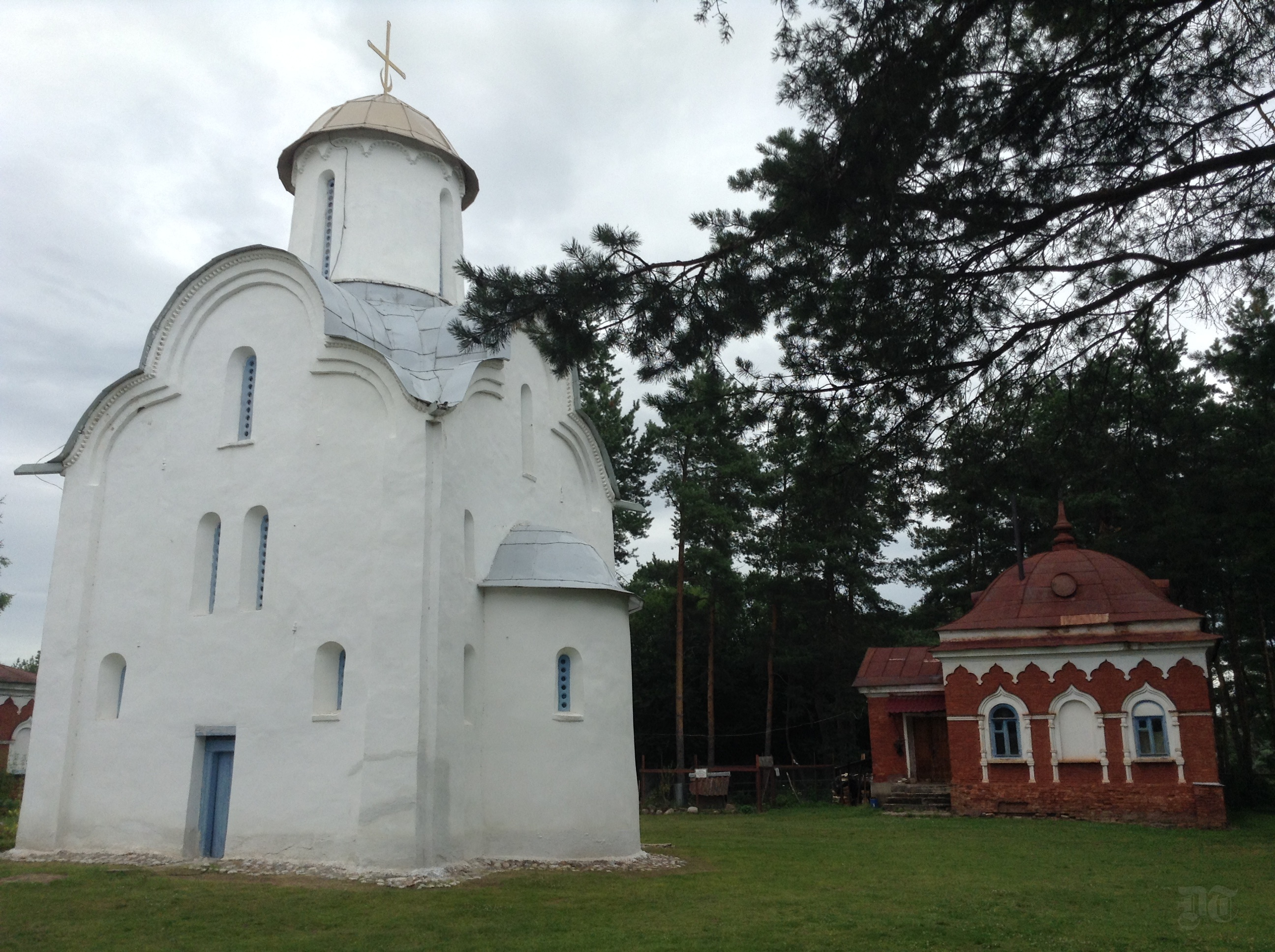
Church and northern cell

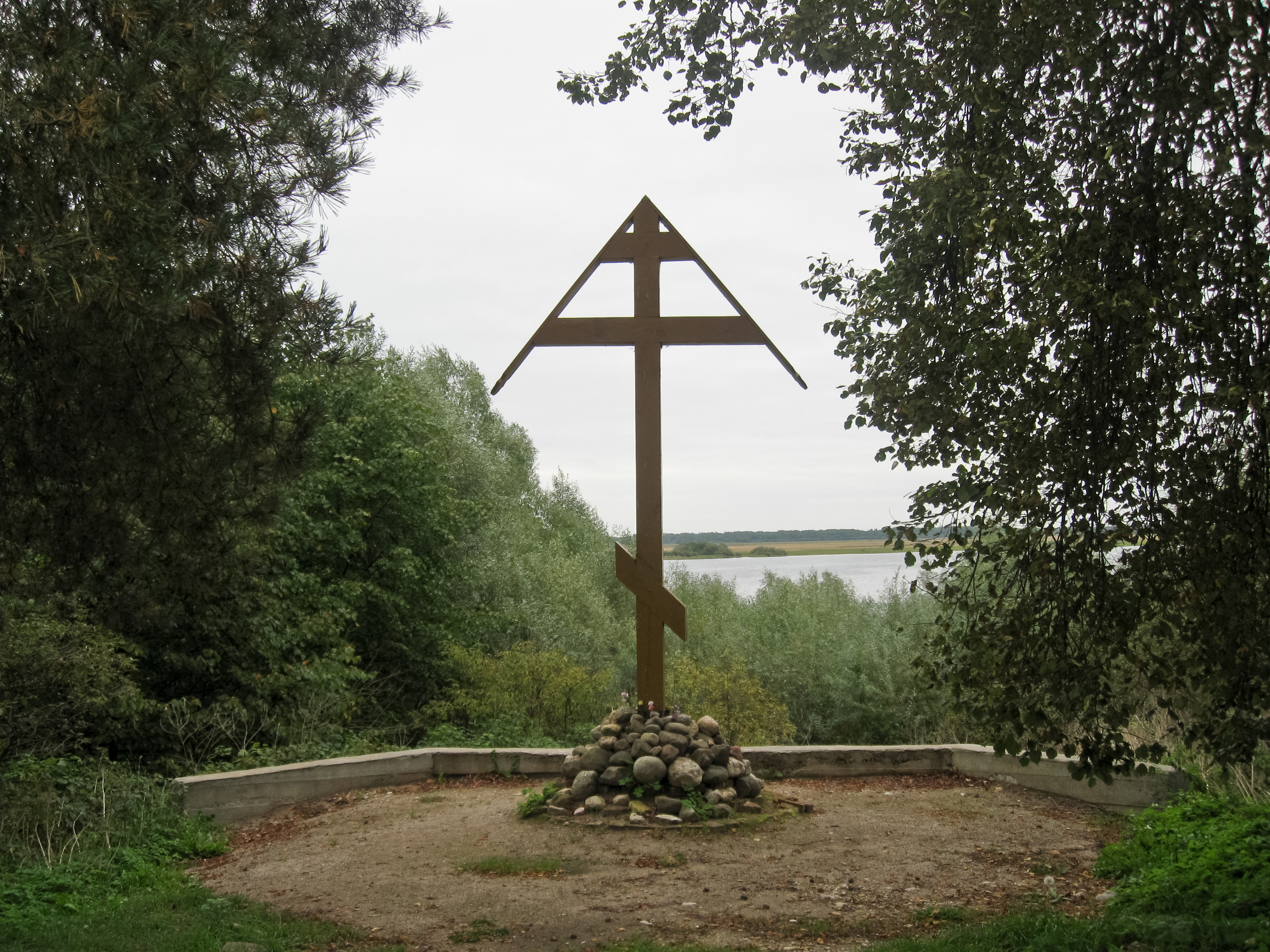
Cross

== Bibliography ==
- Tatishchev, Vasily (1994). Sobranie sočineniy v 8 tomax. Istoriă Rossiyskaă s samyh drevneishih vremёn (in Russian). Vol. 2, 3. Moscow: Ladomir. ISBN 978-5-86218-160-9.
- Rybakov, Boris (1987). Язычество древних славян (in Russian). Moscow: Akademia Nauk ZSRR.
- Sedov, Vladimir (2009). Церковь Рождества Богородицы в Перыни: новгородский вариант башнеобразного храма (in Russian). Moscow: Severny Palomnik.
- Yanin, Valentin (1984). Опись Новгорода 1617 года (in Russian). Moscow: Akademia Nauk ZSRR. p. 1–175.
- Stroyev, Pavel (2007). Списки иерархов и настоятелей монастырей российския церкви (in Russian). Moscow: Рукописные памятники Древней Руси. ISBN 978-5-9551-0072-2.
- Minakov, Arkady (2013). "The Circumstances of the Occurrence and Activity of the "Orthodox Party" in the 1820s". Hristianskoe čtenie. 1: 25–38. ISSN 1814-5574.
- Mizeretsky, Ivan (1885). "Рассказы об архимандрите Фотии / Записал Ф. С". Istorychesky Vestnik (in Russian). 21 (9 ed.): 557–575.
- "ПЕРЫ́НЬ". Great Russian Encyclopedia. Online version (in Russian). 2006.
- Nosov, Yevgeny (2007). "Перынь". Великий Новгород. История и культура IX – XVII веков: энциклопедический словарь. Petersburg: Нестор-История.
- Ulubin, Vyacheslav, ed. (2008). Летопись Новгородского Юрьева монастыря (in Russian). Petersburg: Алетейя. ISBN 978-5-903354-06-1.
- Novgorod Fourth Chronicle. Moscow: Языки русской культуры. 2000.
