= Arkazhsky Monastery =

Coordinates: 58°29′35″N 31°15′01″E

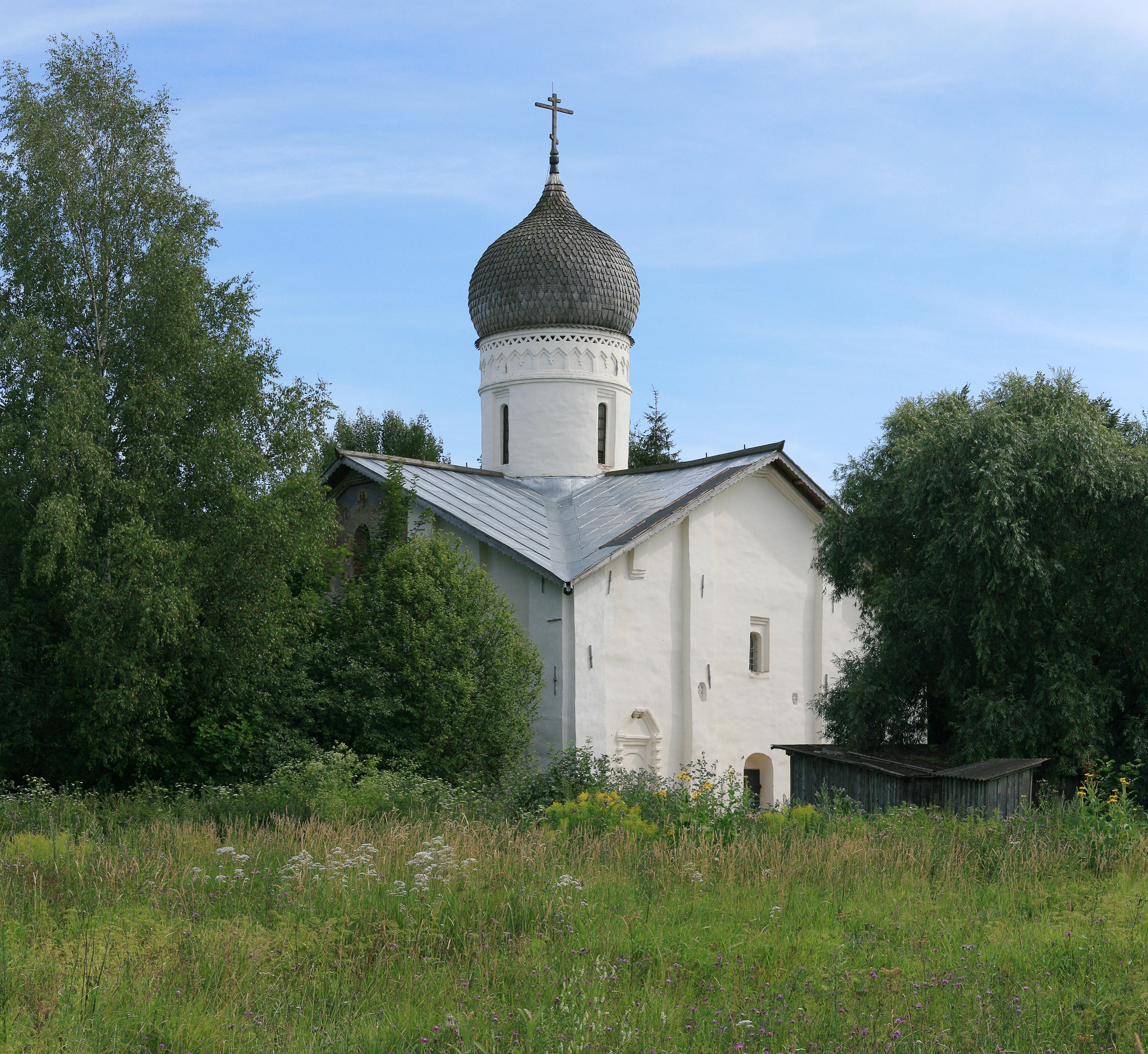
The Church of the Assumption of the Virgin

The Arkazhy Monastery (Russian: Аркажский монастырь, lit. 'Monastery of Arcadius') was one of the most important monasteries of medieval Novgorod the Great. It stood about two miles south of the city and just west of the Yuriev Monastery. All that remains of it today is the Church of the Assumption of the Mother of God, which is visible on the road out to the Yuriev Monastery. The foundations of the medieval monastery were excavated by Soviet archaeologists in 1961.

The monastery was founded by and takes its name from Arkadii, who founded it in 1153 prior to his being elected bishop of Novgorod (1156–1165). He initially built a wooden church to the Assumption. This church was subsequently rebuilt in stone in 1188 by Simeon Dibakevits and was consecrated by Archbishop Gavriil (1186–1192) the following year. Other boyars, including several posadniks, helped add to the monastery over the centuries. In 1206, Posadnik Tverdislav Mikhailovich built the Church of Simeon Stylites over the gates of the monastery; in 1395, Isaak Onkifov had the Church of St. Michael the Archangel rebuilt in stone; it was overhauled in 1407 by Posadnik Yuri Dmitrievich and his cousin Yakov.

In addition to patronizing the monastery, at least two posadniks, in fact a father and son, became monks there: in 1206, Posadnik Mikhailko was shorn in the schema, the highest level of Eastern Christian monasticism, in the Arkazhsky Monastery and died there, having taken the monastic name Mitrofan. In 1222, his son Tverdislav was also shorn a monk in the monastery after he had taken ill.
