= List of oldest Russian icons =

This is a list of the oldest Russian icons that were painted before and during the reign of Alexander Nevsky (1220–1263).

== 1000–1130 ==
Image	Name and date	Provenance	Current location
Russo-Byzantine icons (possibly painted by Greek artists in Kievan Rus)
	Saviour in a Golden Riza c. 1050 (overpainted in 1699)	Saint Sophia Cathedral in Novgorod	Dormition Cathedral, Moscow
	Saints Peter and Paul c. 1050 (partly overpainted in the 16th century)	Saint Sophia Cathedral in Novgorod	Novgorod Art Museum
	Saint George // Hodegetria (double-sided) c. 1100	Yuriev Monastery; Dormition Cathedral, Moscow	Dormition Cathedral, Moscow
	Theotokos of Vladimir c. 1100	Dormition Cathedral, Vladimir; Dormition Cathedral, Moscow; State Tretyakov Gallery (Church of St. Nicholas in Tolmachi)	Cathedral of Christ the Saviour

== 1130–1200 ==
Image	Name and date	Provenance	Current location
Icons of Novgorod
	Ustyug Annunciation, c. 1130	Yuriev Monastery Cathedral of the Annunciation	State Tretyakov Gallery
	Saint George c. 1130	Yuriev Monastery	State Tretyakov Gallery
	The Sign (double-sided) c. 1150	Saint Sophia Cathedral in Novgorod	Saint Sophia Cathedral in Novgorod
	The Mandylion (double-sided) c. 1180	Dormition Cathedral, Moscow	Tretyakov Gallery
	The Angel with Golden Hair	Rumyantsev Museum	State Russian Museum
	Eleusa	Dormition Cathedral, Moscow	State Tretyakov Gallery
	Saint Nicholas c. 1200	Novodevichy Convent	State Tretyakov Gallery
Icons of Vladimir-Suzdal
	Theotokos of Bogolyubovo; 1155	Bogolyubovo	Convent of Princesses, Vladimir
	Our Lady of Saint Theodore // Saint Paraskevi (double-sided)	Gorodets-on-the-Volga (Alexander Nevsky's family)	Theophany Monastery, Kostroma
	Deesis with the Archangels; 1180s?	Dormition Cathedral, Moscow	State Tretyakov Gallery

== 1200–1250 ==
Image	Name and date	Provenance	Current location
Icons of Vladimir and Suzdal
	Deesis with John the Baptist and the Virgin	Dormition Cathedral, Moscow	State Tretyakov Gallery
	Saint Michael Appearing to Joshua; 1190s? 1210s?	Dormition Cathedral, Moscow	Dormition Cathedral, Moscow
	Demetrius of Thessaloniki; 1190s? 1210s?	Dormition Cathedral, Dmitrov (a gift from Vsevolod III)	State Tretyakov Gallery
	Saviour of Golden Locks (Christ Chalkites) c. 1200	Dormition Cathedral, Moscow (probably brought from Yaroslavl)	Dormition Cathedral, Moscow
Icons of Yaroslavl and Rostov
	Orans of Yaroslavl (Great Panagia) c. 1220	Dormition Cathedral, Yaroslavl	State Tretyakov Gallery
	Saviour of Yaroslavl (Christ Pantocrator) c. 1220	Dormition Cathedral, Yaroslavl	Yaroslavl Art Museum
	Michael the Archangel c. 1220	Archangel Cathedral, Yaroslavl	State Tretyakov Gallery
	The Mandylion	Novlenskoye (near Poshekhonye)	State Tretyakov Gallery
	Christ Pantocrator c. 1250	Gavshinka Church near Yaroslavl	Andrei Rublev Museum (Andronikov Monastery)
	Theotokos of Tolga Enthroned	Tolga Monastery, Yaroslavl	State Tretyakov Gallery
	Theotokos of Kashin	St. Demetrius Monastery, Kashin	Kalyazin Art Museum
Icons of Novgorod and Belozersk
	The Cloud Dormition c. 1200	Monastery of the Tithes, Novgorod	State Tretyakov Gallery
	Our Lady of the Sign // Saint Juliana	Zverin Monastery, Novgorod	Pavel Korin's collection at the Tretyakov Gallery
	Eleusa of Staraya Russa	Staraya Russa	State Russian Museum
	Theotokos of Belozersk c. 1220	Belozersk Cathedral	State Russian Museum
	Saints Peter and Paul	Church of Sts. Peter and Paul; Belozersk	State Russian Museum
	St. John Climacus with Sts. George and Blaise c. 1250	Krestsy near Novgorod	State Russian Museum

== See also ==
- Russian icons

== Sources ==
- В. Д. Сарабьянов, Э. С. Смирнова. История древнерусской живописи. М., ПСТГУ, 2007.
