= Ustyug Annunciation =

12th-century Russian icon

Annunciation of Ustyug
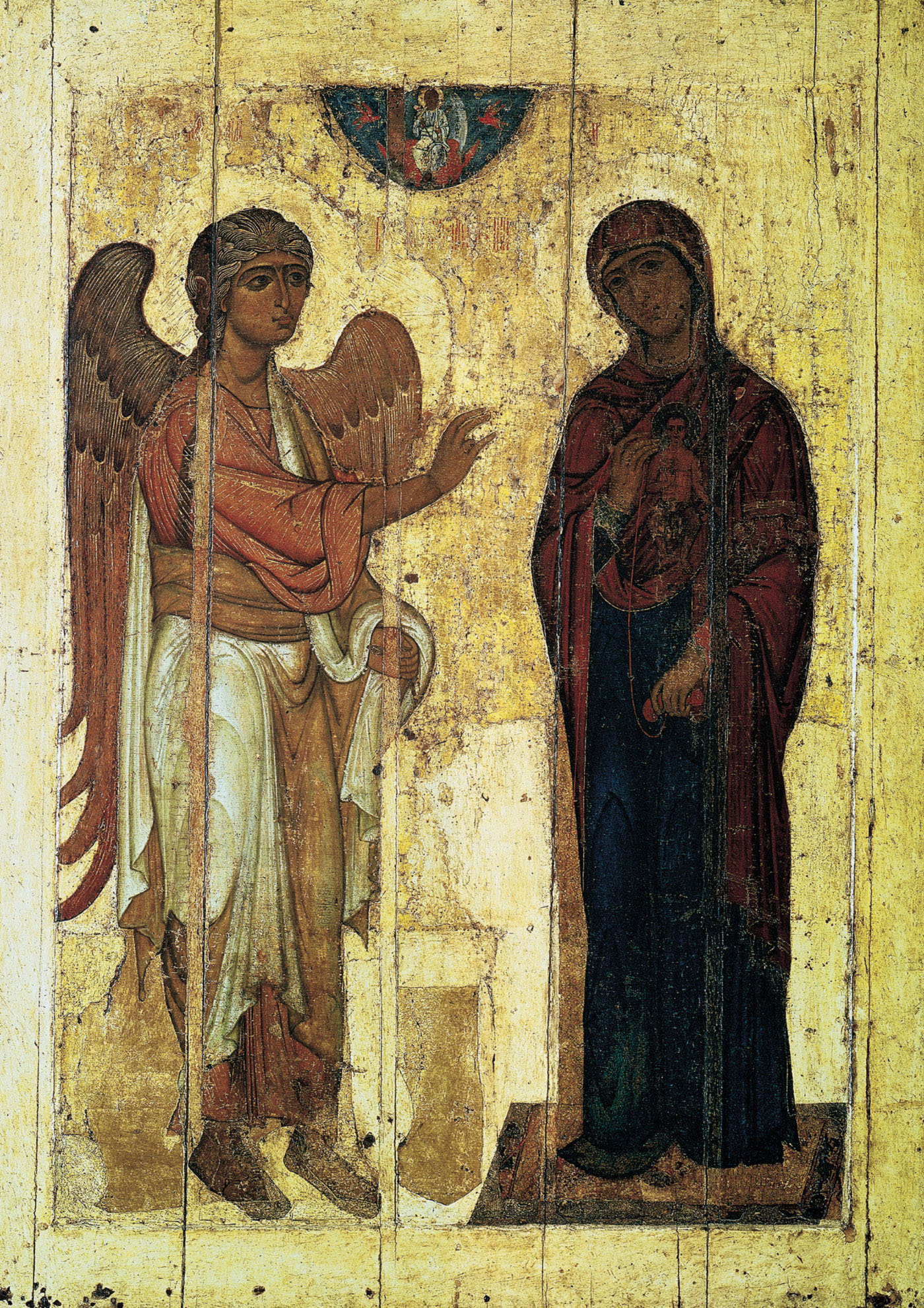
- Artist: Unknown artist
- Year: circa 1120–1130
- Type: Wood, tempera
- Dimensions: 238 cm × 168 cm (94 in × 66 in)
- Location: Tretyakov Gallery, Moscow

Annunciation of Ustyug (Russian: Устюжское Благовещение) is a Russian Annunciation icon, created in Novgorod in the 12th century, and one of the few icons which survived the Mongol invasion of Rus'. The Annunciation of Ustyug is currently held in the Tretyakov Gallery. The origins of the icon and the exact date of its creation are disputed.

== History ==
A history of this icon is known because it was described in several 16th–17th-century sources, including the Second Chronicle of Novgorod. The chronicles depict the scene of transferring it by Ivan the Terrible from Saint Sophia Cathedral to Moscow in the mid-16th century. The exact date of transfer is unknown, as different versions state 1547, 1554 or 1561. At first it was held in Cathedral of the Annunciation in the Moscow Kremlin, but in the fore-part of the 17th century was moved to Dormition Cathedral. Circa 16th-17th century, it was decorated with gold, gemstones and pearls. After the shutting of Dormition Cathedral in 1918, Annunciation of Ustyug was taken to the State Historical Museum. In 1920 scientists started to work on its restoration. In 1930 the museum handed it over to Tretyakov Gallery, where in 1935 restoration was finally finished. It was also restored in the 16th and 17th centuries.

=== Name ===
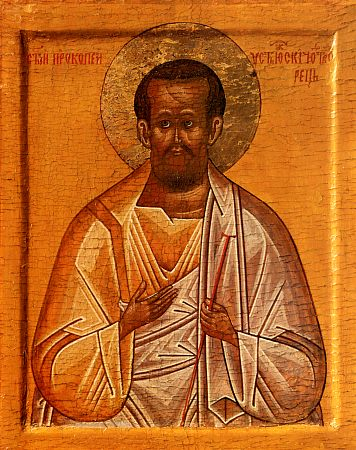
Procopius of Ustyug.

Annunciation of Ustyug gained its name due to the legend that Saint Procopius of Ustyug predicted the fall of meteorite near Veliky Ustyug town. He predicted subsequent storm, tornado and conflagrations as well. He tried to convince Veliky Ustyug's citizens to confess their sins and pray for the city to be saved, but they did not believe him and only in the last minute, when the storm had already started, escaped to the church and started to pray. The whole story was outlined in Life of Procopius of Ustyug (Russian: Житие Прокопия Устюжского), written in the 17th century. A legend, which appeared in the 18th century, said that Procopius himself prayed in front of Annunciation to be saved from beating with "stone hail". However no historical confirmation of this event was found. To the contrary, according to the Chronicles of Ustyug, the fire of 1496 destroyed every icon and book inside the church, where the Annunciation was held. Hence it had been burnt down even before Ivan the Terrible was born.

Nevertheless, many authoritative religious figures maintained the legend, connecting the Annunciation with Saint Procopius. In 1747 a copy of the Annunciation was made and solemnly carried to Veliky Ustyug. On July 8 (Julian calendar) the holiday "A sign from the Annunciation icon in Ustyug town" was established. During the French invasion of Russia golden decoration and gemstones were stolen, and Veliky Ustyug's citizens donated eight thousand rubles to renew the icon.

=== Origin and dating ===
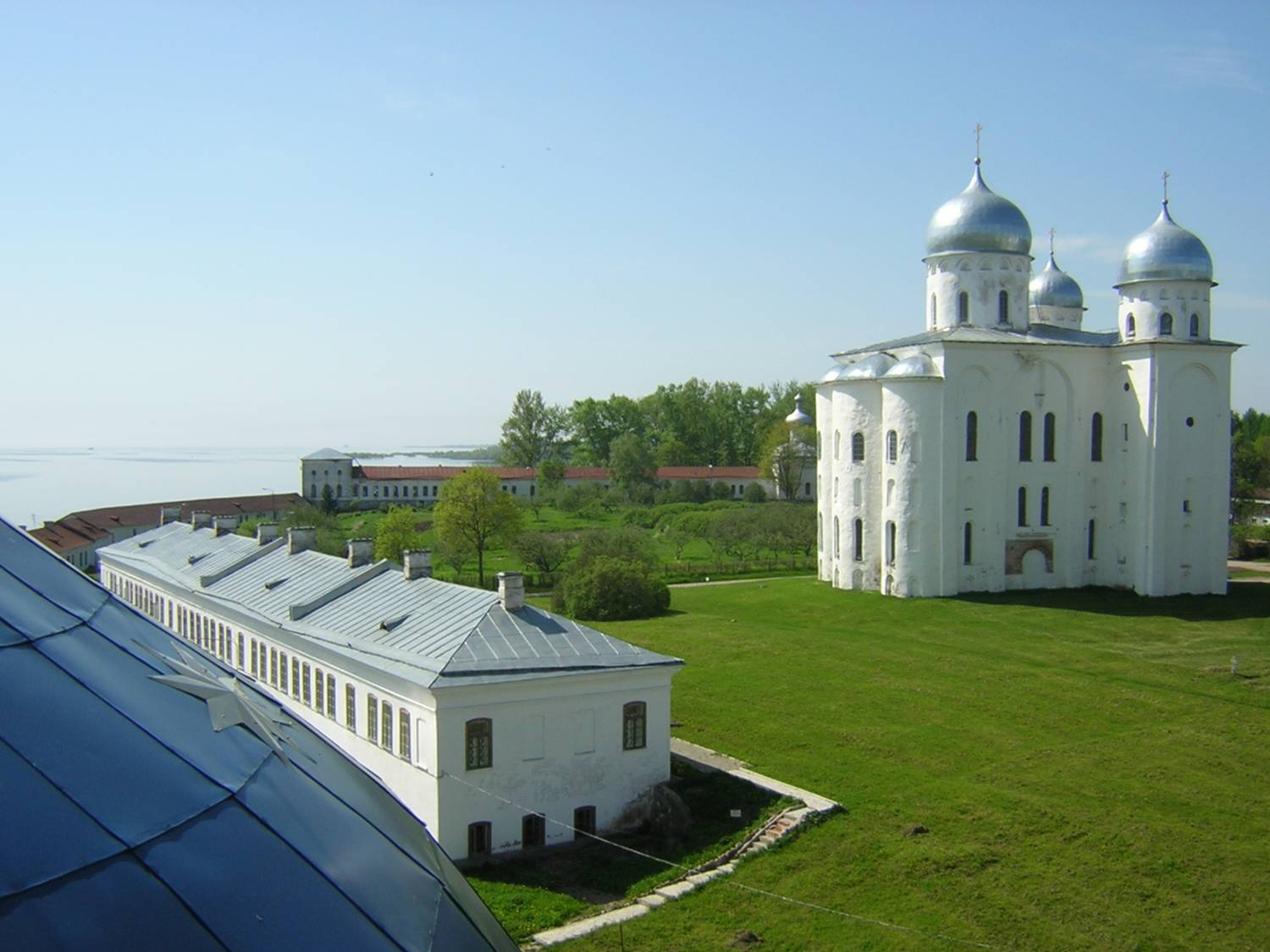
St. George's Cathedral (built in 1119).

Novgorod origin of the Annunciation of Ustyug was first discussed in 1928, although no one showed any proofs of this theory. In 1933 Dmitry Aynalov tried to develop the proof based on the 1554 message of dyak Ivan Viskovatyi, who mentioned Annunciation icon in connection with Novgorod's Yuriev Monastery (Church Slavonic: "да на оконе Благовещениа Святыя Богородици, вверху написанъ образъ Господа Саваофа… вземъ царь и великий князь в Великом Новеграде в Юрьеве Монастыре, а письмо корсунское, а как принесена из Корсуни, тому лет пятьсот и более"). Finally, Soviet arts critic Viktor Lazarev found a decisive evidence. He compared the proportions of Novgorod's Saint George icon (created at the same time) with Annunciation of Ustyug and found definite sameness. He also discovered several identical Annunciation icons in the art of Novgorod.

Viktor Lazarev marked the date of creation as 1119–1130, connecting icon's making with the building of St. George's Cathedral in Yuriev Monastery. Macarius I, dating it the 11th century, supposed that it was created in the year when the Yuriev Monastery itself was built. Some scientists named the earlier dates, yet Galina Kolpakova attributed the Annunciation to 1119—1130 period.

== Copies ==
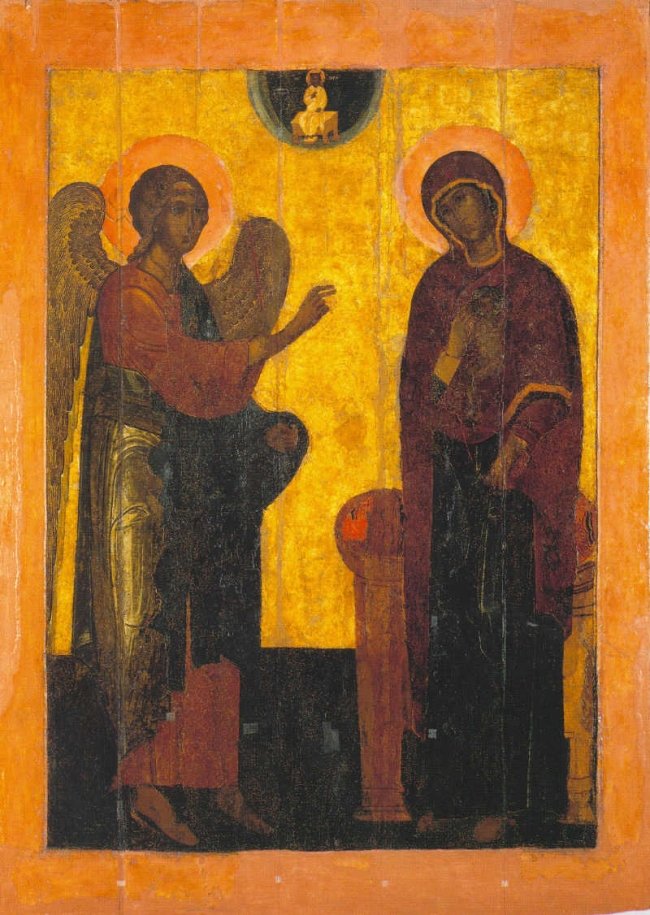
A copy of Annunciation of Ustyug in Cathedral of the Archangel (16th century).

Several copies from the original Annunciation were created.

- for Cathedral of the Archangel, painted in the 16th century. Considered to be the closest to the original.
- for Troitse-Sergiyeva Lavra, painted in the 16th century.
- for Cathedral of the Annunciation in Moscow Kremlin, painted in the 17th century.
- for Novodevichy Convent.
- for Solovetsky Monastery, painted in the 16th-17th centuries.
