= Epitaphios of Dmitry Shemyaka =

1444 Russian epitaphios

Epitaphios of Grand Prince Dmitry Shemyaka
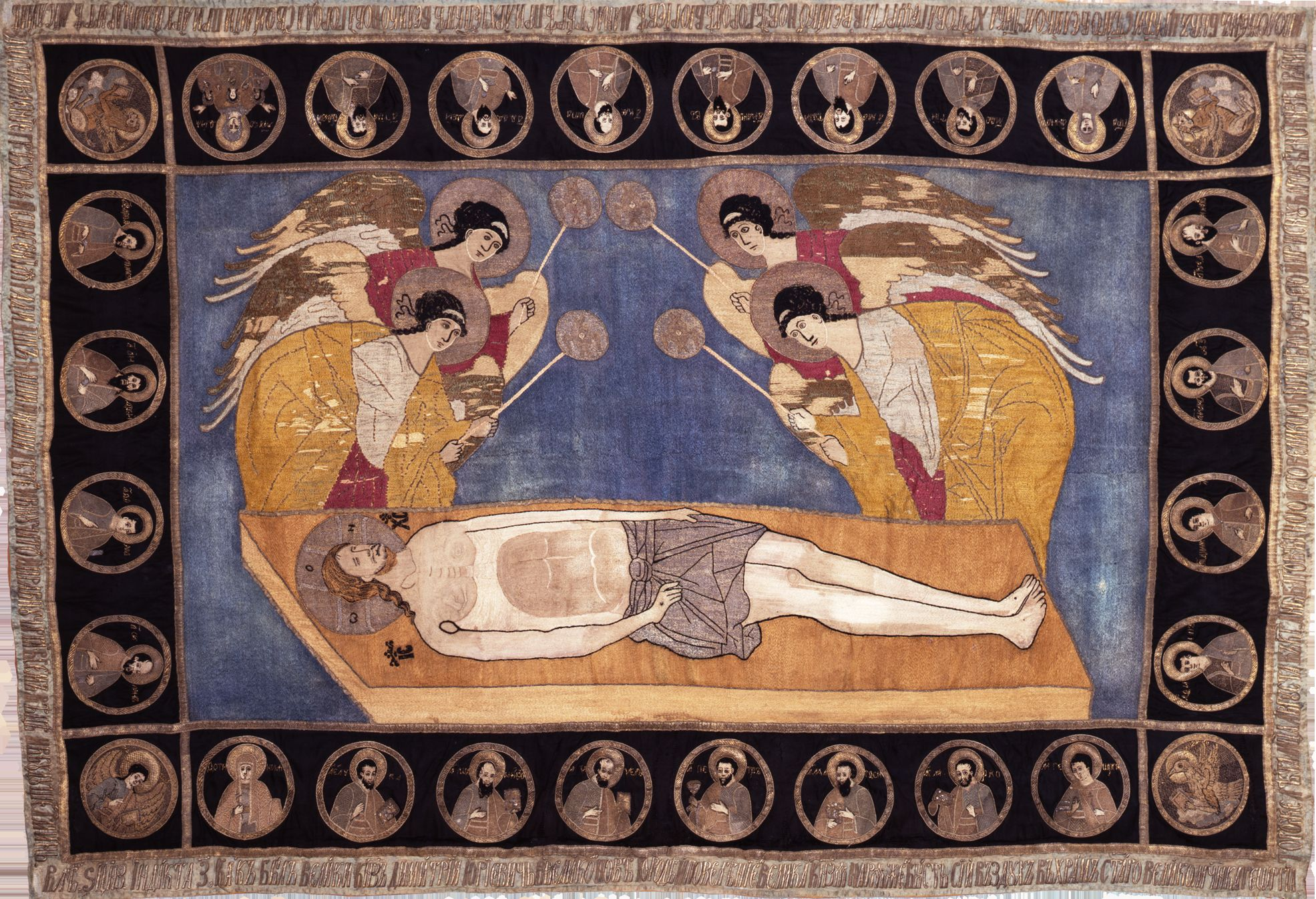
- Material: taffeta, gold thread, silver thread, silk thread, canvas
- Size: 183 cm × 124.5 cm (6 ft 0 in × 4 ft 1.0 in)
- Present location: Veliky Novgorod
- Period: 1444

Epitaphios of Grand Prince Dmitry Shemyaka (Russian: Шемякина плащаница) is an epitaphios donated to the Yuriev Monastery by the family of Dmitry Shemyaka. It dates back to 1444. The work is kept in the Novgorod Museum-Reserve.

== Description ==
The epitaphios depicts Christ in the tomb and four angels. It is a contribution of Dmitry Shemyaka, his wife Sofiya Dmitrievna and son Ivan to the Yuriev Monastery as evidenced by the inscription on the edge of the fabric.

The materials of the epitaphios are taffeta, gold thread, silver thread, silk thread, canvas; its size is 183 × 124,5 cm.
