= Veliky Ustyug (disambiguation) =

Veliky Ustyug is a town in Vologda Oblast, Russia.

Veliky Ustyug may also refer to:

- Veliky Ustyug (pseudometeorite)
- Veliky Ustyug Airport
