= The Angel with Golden Hair =

Painting from the Russian Museum

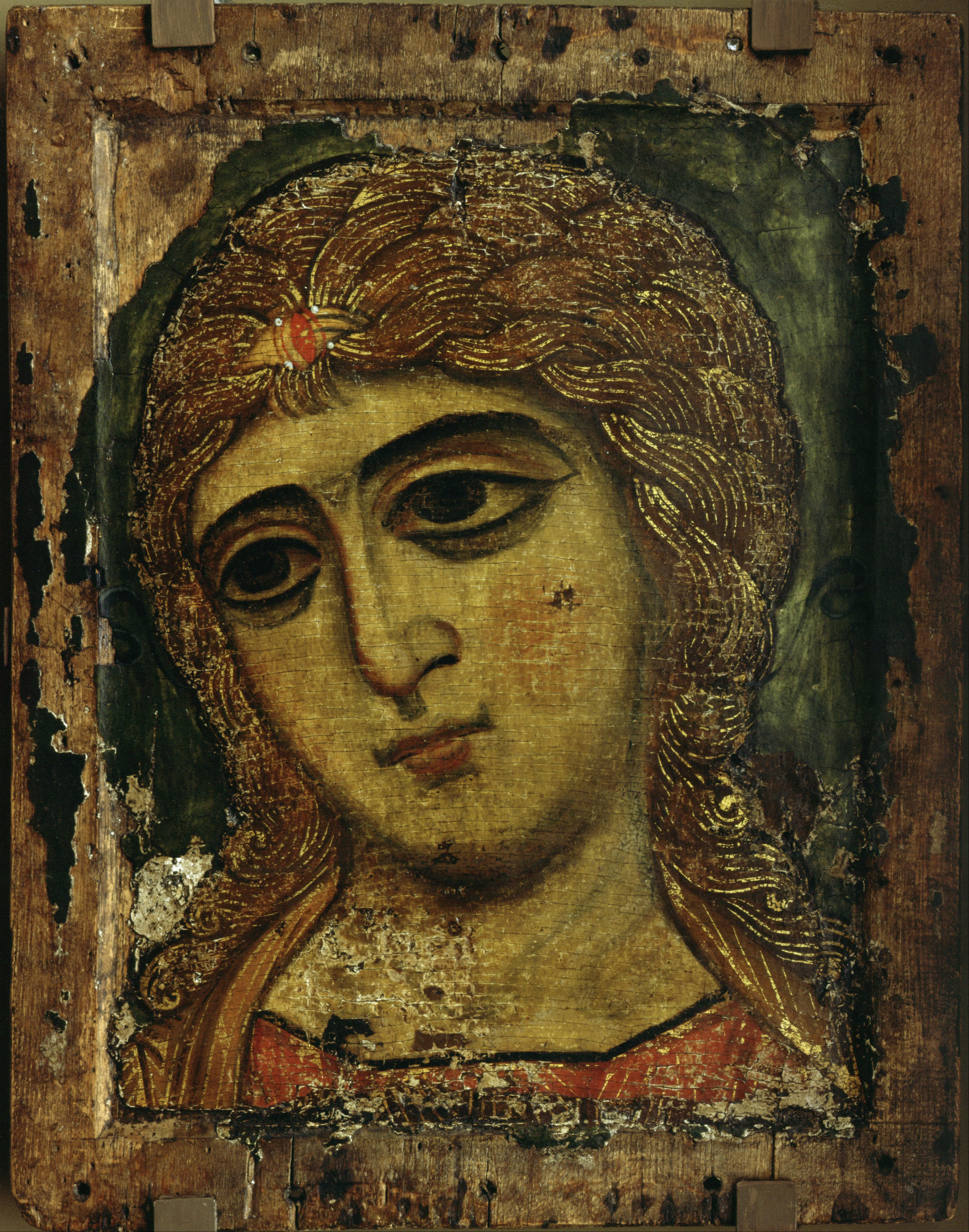
- Year: c. 1200
- Medium: Tempera on wood
- Dimensions: 48.8 cm × 39 cm (19.2 in × 15 in)
- Location: Russian Museum, Saint Petersburg

The Angel with Golden Hair (Russian: Ангел Златые Власы, romanized: Angel Zlatye Vlasy), also known as the Archangel Gabriel (Russian: Архангел Гавриил), is a tempera icon by an unknown Russian artist, painted in the second half of the 12th century. It is displayed in the Russian Museum in Saint Petersburg.

The Angel with Golden Hair is the oldest Russian icon from the collection of the Russian Museum. Most experts attribute it to the Novgorod school of icon painting. What characterizes this icon is the golden hair with added gold leaf. For each hair of the angel a thin gold strip from a gold leaf was laid, which makes the hair shine with a celestial light, as the gold symbolizes the divine.

== Description ==
The icon is one of Russia's oldest surviving icons, dating from the pre-Mongol invasion period. It was hung at the Kremlin church in Moscow in the 16th century. The icon was possibly brought from Novgorod to the city of Moscow during the reign of Ivan the Terrible, when he pillaged the city and moved its sacred objects to his capital.

During the 12th century, the most prominent tier of the iconostasis, a screen of icons in front of the altar, was the Deesis (also known as "Supplication") tier—an image of Christ with his mother surrounded by angels and saints. It is thought that 'The Angel with Golden Hair was part of that. The huge cheeks and a wide almond-shaped eyes of this icon resemble the frescoes in the Chapel of the Theotokos on the Patmos island in Greece. Otherwise it is close to the style in the murals of the Saviour Church on Nereditsa Hill (1199) in Novgorod, where it is suggested that it was part of the Deesis tier. The artwork is the result of the Byzantine art influence of the city of Novgorod between the late 12th and early 13th centuries, which spread to the city of Moscow around the year 1200.

== History ==
The icon was discovered by the art historian Georgy Filimonov in 1864 while dismantling the "junk storeroom" in the "tent" (the attic) of the Ivan the Great Bell Tower in Moscow Kremlin, where "dilapidated and unusable" icons were laid, destined for destruction. The icon was moved to Rumyantsev Museum, where it was attributed to Simon Ushakov's circle. The conclusion was based on the last restoration of the icon, made in the 17th century. After the dissolution of the Rumyantsev Museum in 1925, the icon as part of the collection of Christian antiquities was transferred to the State Historical Museum, where the restorer E. I. Bryagin cleaned it. Due to the poor preservation of the painting, the restorer was forced to preserve significant remains of the 17th-century additions to the icon, such as the green background, clothes, writing on the hair, and gold. In 1926 it was first exhibited at an exhibition of the monuments of ancient Russian icon paintings in the State Historical Museum. In 1930 the collection of Christian antiquities was moved to the Tretyakov Gallery. Then in 1934 the icon was moved to the collection of Russian Museum. According to Viktor Lazarev: you have to connect this icon to Byzantine influence exerted on the art of Novgorod in the 12th century. It could be a work of the workshop of Olisey the Greek. The icon is similar to the Holy Face of Novgorod painted on the back of the Adoration of the Cross but which is attributed to "an unknown author" by the Tretyakov Museum.

== See also ==
- List of oldest Russian icons

== Bibliography ==
- Kolpakova, Galina (2007). Art of Ancient Rus': Pre-Mongol Period (in Russian). ABC (publishing house). pp. 451–452. ISBN 978-5-352-02088-3.
- Shalina, I. A. (1997). "Icon "Angel Golden Hair" and Its Place in the Artistic Culture of Russia Around 1200". Old Russian Art. 800 Years of the Dmitrievsky Cathedral in Vladimir (in Russian). pp. 188–219.
