= Christotokos =

Greek title of Mary

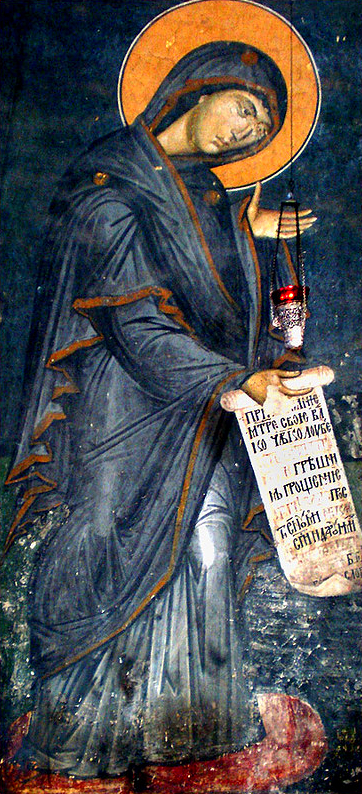
"Mary, Mother of Christ" from Visoki Dečani Monastery, Serbia

Christotokos (Greek: Χριστοτόκος) is a title of Mary, the mother of Jesus. Its English translation is Christ-bearer or, less literally, Mother of Christ. It is used by Christians universally, but particular attention is given to it in the non-Ephesian (or "Nestorian") Church of the East, due to its grievances with the title Theotokos.

== Etymology ==
Christotokos is derived from two Greek words: Christos (Χριστός), meaning "Christ", a title meaning "anointed one" and corresponding to the Hebrew term "Messiah"; and Tokos (τόκος), meaning "bearer" or "giver of birth".

As a term that is much less theologically complex, "Christotokos" can be easily translated into many languages, as precise accuracy is not essential in this context.

== Theology ==
While it explicitly describes the Virgin Mary, who birthed Jesus Christ, it also makes implicit theological statements about Jesus himself, particularly with regard to his natures and how they subsist within the prosopon of the Incarnate Word.

=== Third Ecumenical Council ===
One of the main proponents of the term was Nestorius of Constantinople, who, during the events surrounding the Council of Ephesus, fiercely defended its complete orthodoxy against Theotokos, a term preferred by his opponent, Cyril of Alexandria.

== See also ==
- Anthropotokos
