= Theotokos of Bogolyubovo =

Russian Marian icon

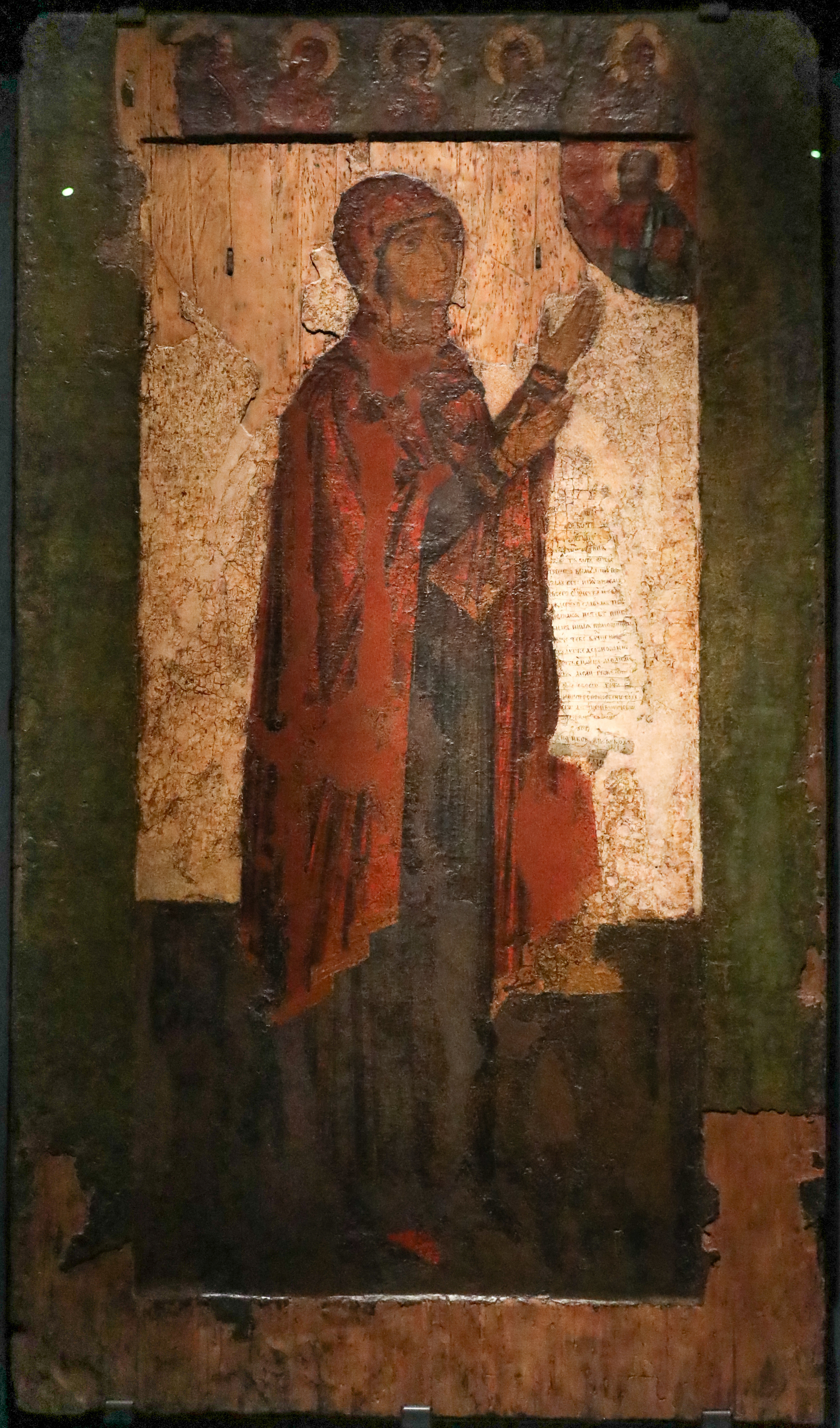
The Bogolubskaya Icon of the Theotokos, 12th century (Vladimir-Suzdal Museum).

The Theotokos of Bogolyubovo or Bogolubovo Icon (Russian: Боголюбская икона Божией Матери) is a Theotokos Agiosoritissa, a type of Marian icon, which is venerated and perceived as wonderworking by the Russian Orthodox Church. The icon was painted in 1157 at the request of Grand Prince Andrew Bogolubsky, in commemoration of an appearance to him by the Mother of God.

== History ==
According to Orthodox tradition, when the prince was moving from Vyshgorod to the Suzdal Principality in 1155, he took the Wonderworking Icon of the Theotokos from the Mezhyhirskyi Monastery in Vyshgorod with him, and served molebens in front of it every day. About 11 versts (7.26 miles) from the city of Vladimir, as they approached the shore of the Klyazma River, the horses carrying the icon suddenly stopped and would not move forward. After prayer, the prince went to his tent and there the Theotokos appeared to him in a dream-like vision holding a scroll in her right hand, and commanded him to place her icon in the city of Vladimir and to build a temple (church) and monastery on the place of the vision. (Ever since this time, that icon has been known as Our Lady of Vladimir.) Great Prince Andrew did as he was told, and also commissioned the Bogolubsky Icon of the Theotokos.

== Description of icon ==
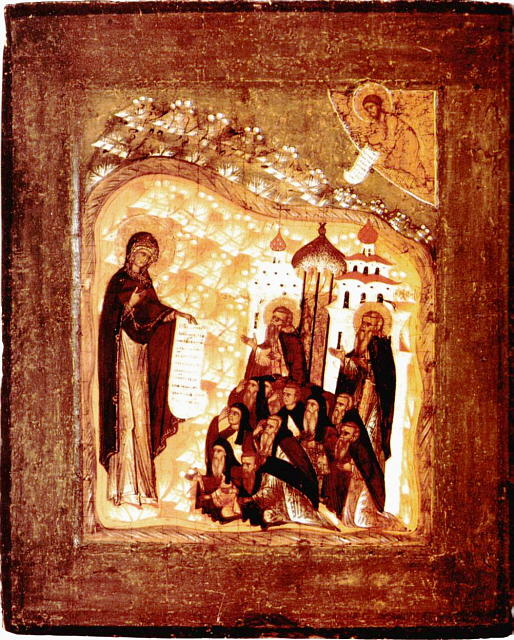
The Bogolubskaya Icon of the Theotokos with Ss. Zosimus and Sabbatius (Old Believer oratory at Volkov cemetery, St. Petersburg).

On the icon, the Theotokos is depicted in full stature, holding a scroll in her right hand. Her left hand is turned in prayer to Jesus Christ, who is depicted in an aureole in the upper-right hand corner. Prince Andrew himself is depicted prayerfully, on his knees before the Theotokos. In variations of the icon, other saints may appear at the feet of the Virgin, such as saints Zosimus and Sabbatius of Solovki.

== Naming and residences ==
The icon came to be named after Prince Andrew Bogoliubsky ("Lover of God") and was placed in the monastery he built. The church prince Andrew built was consecrated in honor of the Great Feast of the Nativity of the Theotokos, and the icon he commissioned was placed there. The monastery he built has come to be known as Bogolubsky Convent, and the town which grew up around it was called Bogolubovo. The icon of Our Lady of Vladimir remained in the convent while work was completed on the Dormition Cathedral in Vladimir, after which it was solemnly translated to the cathedral.

The original Bogolubskaya icon is kept in the Knyaginin Convent of Vladimir, but over the centuries numerous copies of the icon have been made, and it continues to be venerated in many churches both in Russia and throughout the world. Before the Bolshevik Revolution the icon was brought annually on May 21 (June 3) to the city Vladimir where it remained until July 16 (July 29), when it was returned from there to the monastery.

== Feast day ==
In 1771 a feast day was established in honor of the Bogolubskaya icon and in memory of the deliverance of the city of Vladimir and its vicinity from plague. The feast day is June 18 (for those churches which use the traditional Julian Calendar, June 18 currently falls on July 1 of the modern Gregorian Calendar).

== See also ==
- List of oldest Russian icons
