= Theotokos =

Title of Mary in Eastern Christianity

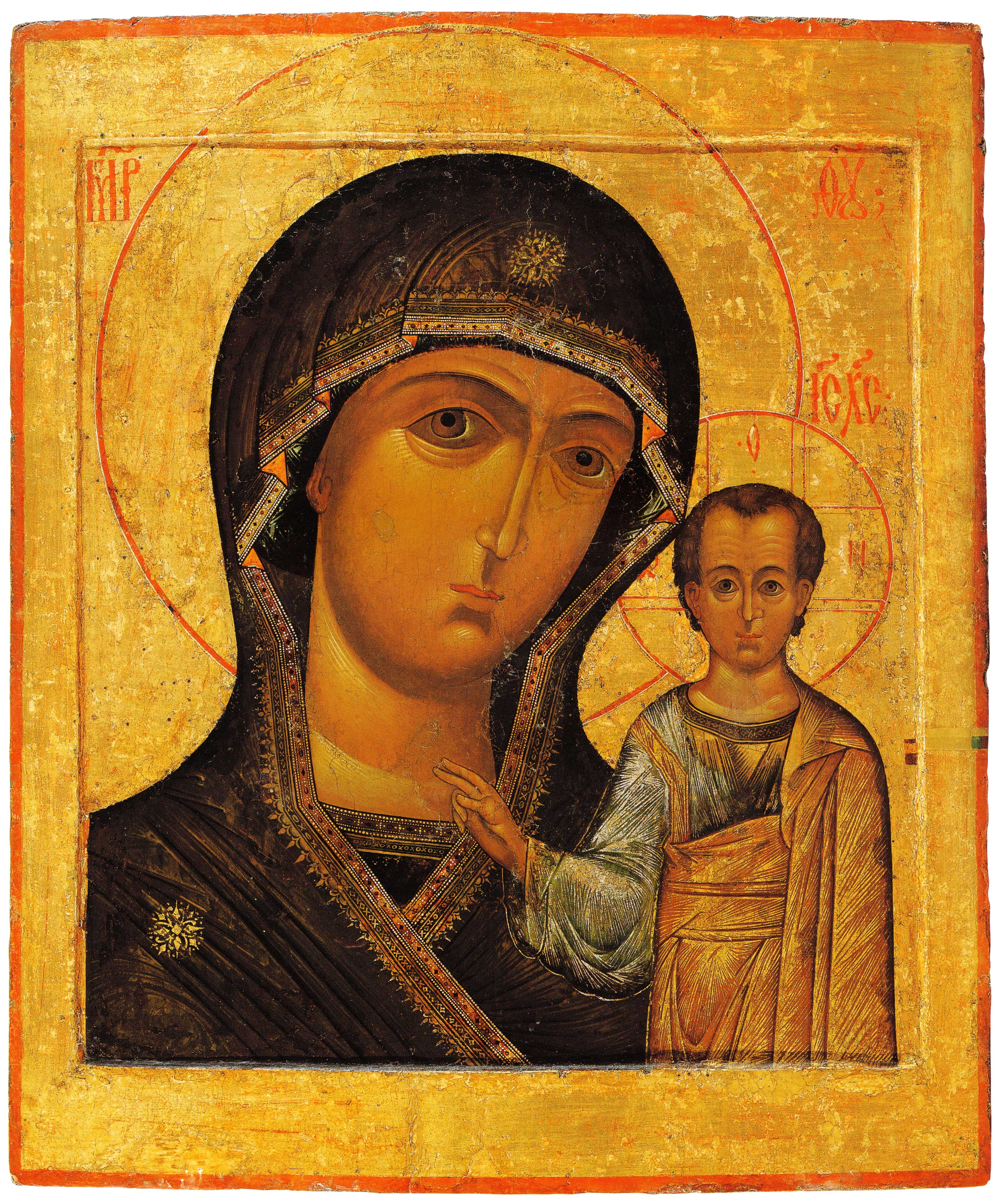
An icon of the Theotokos of Kazan.

Theotokos (Koine Greek: Θεοτόκος) (Note: English pronunciation: UK: /θiˈɒtəkɒs/, US: /ˌθiːəˈtoʊkoʊs, ˌθeɪə-, -ˈtɒk-, -kəs/; Modern Greek pronunciation: [θeoˈtokos].) is a title of Mary, mother of Jesus, used especially in Eastern Christianity. The usual Latin translations are Dei Genitrix or Deipara (approximately "parent [fem] of God"). Common English translations are "Mother of God" or "God-bearer", but these both have different literal equivalents in Ancient Greek: Μήτηρ Θεοῦ and Θεοφόρος respectively.

The title has been in use since the 3rd century, and in the 4th-century Liturgy of Saint James. The Council of Ephesus in AD 431 decreed that Mary is the Theotokos because her son Jesus is both God and man: one divine person from two natures (divine and human) intimately and hypostatically united.

The title of Mother of God (Ancient Greek: Μήτηρ (τοῦ) Θεοῦ) or Mother of Incarnate God, abbreviated ΜΡ ΘΥ (the first and last letter of main two words in Greek), is most often used in English, largely due to the lack of a satisfactory equivalent of the Greek τόκος. For the same reason, the title is often left untranslated, as Theotókos, in Eastern liturgical usage of other languages.

Theotokos is also used as the term for an Eastern icon, or type of icon, of the Mother with Child (typically called a Madonna in the Western tradition), as in "the Theotokos of Vladimir" both for the original 12th-century icon and for icons that are copies or imitate its composition.

== Etymology ==
Byzantine mosaic of the enthroned Theotokos, Basilica of Sant'Apollinare Nuovo, Ravenna, c. AD 560.

Theotokos is an adjectival compound of two Greek words Θεός "God" and τόκος "childbirth, parturition; offspring". A close paraphrase would be "[she] whose offspring is God" or "[she] who gave birth to one who was God". The usual English translation is "Mother of God"; Latin uses Deipara or Dei Genitrix.

The Church Slavonic translation is Bogoroditsa (Russian/Serbian/Bulgarian Богородица). The full title of Mary in Slavic Orthodox tradition is Прест҃а́ѧ влⷣчица на́ша бцⷣа и҆ прⷭ҇нод҃ва мр҃і́а (Russian: Пресвятая Владычица наша Богородица и Приснодева Мария), from Greek Ὑπεραγία δέσποινα ἡμῶν Θεοτόκος καὶ ἀειπάρθενος Μαρία "Our Most Holy Lady Theotokos and Ever-Virgin Mary". German has the translation Gottesgebärerin (lit. 'bearer of God'). In Arabic, there are two main terms which are widely used at the general level, first one is: Walidatu-liilahi (Arabic: وَالِدَةُ ٱلْإِلَـٰهِ lit. 'Birther of God') and Ùmmu-'llahi (أُمُّ ٱللهِ) or Ùmmu-l'iilahi, (أُمُّ ٱلْإِلَـٰهِ), lit. 'Mother of God').

"Mother of God" is the literal translation of a distinct title in Greek, Μήτηρ τοῦ Θεοῦ (Mḗtēr toû Theoû), a term which has an established usage of its own in traditional Orthodox and Catholic theological writing, hymnography, and iconography. In an abbreviated form, ΜΡ ΘΥ (Russian: М҃Р Ѳ҃Ѵ), it often is found on Eastern icons, where it is used to identify Mary. The Russian term is Матерь Божия (also Богома́терь).

Variant forms are the compounds

- Θεομήτωρ: Theomḗtōr
- Μητρόθεος: Mētrótheos
- Θεογεννήτωρ: Theogennḗtōr
- Θεοκυήτωρ: Theokuḗtōr

These are found in patristic and liturgical texts.

The theological dispute over the term concerned the term Θεός "God" versus Χριστός "Christ", and not τόκος (genitrix, "bearer") versus μήτηρ (mater, "mother"), and the two terms have been used as synonyms throughout Christian tradition. Both terms are known to have existed alongside one another since the Early Church, but it has been argued, including in modern times, that the term "Mother of God" is unduly suggestive of Godhead having its origin in Mary, imparting to Mary the role of a Mother Goddess. But this is an exact reiteration of the objection by Nestorius, resolved in the 5th century, to the effect that the term "Mother" expresses exactly the relation of Mary to the incarnate Son ascribed to Mary in Christian theology. (Note: "Pearson is mistaken in supposing that the resolution of the compound Theotocos into μήτηρ τοῦ Θεοῦ was unknown to the early Greek writers. It is not an open question whether Mater Dei, Dei Genitrix, Deipara, μήτηρ τοῦ Θεοῦ are proper equivalents for Θεοτόκος. This point has been settled by the unvarying use of the whole Church of God throughout all the ages from that day to this, but there is, or at least some persons have thought that there was, some question as to how Theotocos should be translated into English. Throughout this volume I have translated it 'Mother of God,' and I propose giving my reasons for considering this the only accurate translation of the word, both from a lexico-graphical and from a theological point of view.") (Note: "It is evident that the word is a composite formed of Θεός God, and τίκτειν to be the mother of a child. Now I have translated the verbal part 'to be the mother of a child' because 'to bear' in English does not necessarily carry the full meaning of the Greek word, which (as Bp. Pearson has well remarked in the passage cited above) includes 'conception, nutrition, and parturition.' It has been suggested that 'God-bearer' is an exact translation. To this I object, that in the first place it is not English; and in the second that it would be an equally and, to my mind, more accurate translation of Θεοφόρος than of Θεοτόκος. Another suggestion is that it be rendered 'the bringer forth of God.' Again I object that, from a rhetorical standpoint, the expression is very open to criticism; and from a lexicographical point of view it is entirely inadequate, for while indeed the parturition does necessarily involve in the course of nature the previous conception and nutrition, it certainly does not express it. Now the word Mother does necessarily express all three of these when used in relation to her child. The reader will remember that the question I am discussing is not whether Mary can properly be called the Mother of God; this Nestorius denied and many in ancient and modern times have been found to agree with him.") (Note: "It only remains to consider whether there is from a theological point of view any objection to the translation, 'Mother of God.' It is true that some persons have thought that such a rendering implied that the Godhead has its origin in Mary, but this was the very objection which Nestorius and his followers urged against the word Theotocos, and this being the case, it constitutes a strong argument in favour of the accuracy of the rendering. Of course the answer to the objection in each case is the same, it is not of the Godhead that Mary is the Mother, but of the Incarnate Son, who is God. 'Mother' expresses exactly the relation to the incarnate Son which St. Cyril, the Council of Ephesus, and all succeeding, not to say also preceding, ages of Catholics, rightly or wrongly, ascribe to Mary.")

== Theology ==
Theologically, the terms "Mother of God", "Mother of Incarnate God" and their variants do not mean that Mary is the source of the divine nature of Jesus, who Christians believe existed with the Father from all eternity.

Within the Orthodox and Catholic traditions, Mother of God has not been understood, nor been intended to be understood, as referring to Mary as Mother of God from eternity — that is, as Mother of God the Father — but only with reference to the birth of Jesus, that is, the Incarnation. To make it explicit, it is sometimes translated Mother of God Incarnate.

The Niceno-Constantinopolitan Creed of 381 affirmed the Christian faith on "one Lord Jesus Christ, the only-begotten Son of God, begotten of the Father before all worlds (æons)", that "came down from heaven, and was incarnate by the Holy Ghost and of the Virgin Mary, and was made man". Hence, the term affirms Jesus Christ's full divinity as God by referencing Mary as the "Mother of [that] God". In the Syriac tradition, the creed contains an addition of Theotokos after mentioning the incarnation, where it reads "...was incarnate by the Holy Spirit and of the Virgin Mary, Mother of God [Syriac: ܝܠܕܬ ܐܠܗܐ, romanized: Yāldath Alāhā or Yoldath Aloho]."

The status of Mary as Theotokos was a topic of theological dispute in the 4th and 5th centuries and was the subject of the decree of the Council of Ephesus of 431 to the effect that, in opposition to those who denied Mary the title Theotokos ("the one who gives birth to God") but called her Christotokos ("the one who gives birth to Christ"), Mary is Theotokos because her son Jesus is one person who is both God and man, divine and human. This decree created the Nestorian Schism. Cyril of Alexandria wrote, "I am amazed that there are some who are entirely in doubt as to whether the holy Virgin should be called Theotokos or not. For if our Lord Jesus Christ is God, how is the holy Virgin who gave [Him] birth, not [Theotokos]?" (Epistle 1, to the monks of Egypt; PG 77:13B). But the argument of Nestorius was that divine and human natures of Christ were distinct, and while Mary is evidently the Christotokos (bearer of Christ), it could be misleading to describe her solely as the "bearer of God" without referencing the humanity. At issue is the interpretation of the Incarnation, and the nature of the hypostatic union of Christ's human and divine natures between Christ's conception and birth.

Within the Orthodox doctrinal teaching on the economy of salvation, Mary's identity, role, and status as Theotokos is acknowledged as indispensable. For this reason, it is formally defined as official dogma. The only other Mariological teaching so defined is that of her virginity. Both of these teachings have a bearing on the identity of Jesus Christ. By contrast, certain other Marian beliefs which do not bear directly on the doctrine concerning the person of Jesus (for example, her sinlessness, the circumstances surrounding her conception and birth, her Presentation in the Temple, her continuing virginity following the birth of Jesus, and her death), which are taught and believed by the Orthodox Church (being expressed in the Church's liturgy and patristic writings), are not formally defined by the Church.

== History of use ==
=== Early Church ===
Originally a title of the Egyptian goddess Isis, the use of Theotokos for the Virgin Mary is first attested in the writings of Hippolytus of Rome. Other early Church Fathers who used it include Ephrem the Syrian in 318, Alexander I of Alexandria in 321, Athanasius of Alexandria in 330, Gregory the Theologian in 370, John Chrysostom in 400, and Augustine of Hippo. In his Epistle to the Ephesians, Ignatius of Antioch (c. 33–108) stated that "God ... was conceived by Mary" (Greek: Ὁ θεὸς ... ἐκυοφορήθη ὑπὸ Μαρίας).

The oldest preserved extant hymn dedicated to the Virgin Mary, Beneath thy Compassion (Greek: Ὑπὸ τὴν σὴν εὐσπλαγχνίαν, Latin: Sub tuum praesidium), has been continually prayed and sung for at least sixteen centuries. It contains the word Theotokos in the Koine Greek vocative as ΘΕΟΤΟΚΕ. The oldest record of this hymn is a papyrus found in Egypt, mostly dated to after 450, but according to a suggestion by Henri de Villiers possibly older, dating to the mid-3rd century.

Gregory of Nazianzus (329–390) wrote:

If anyone does not confess that the Virgin Mary is Theotokos, he is found to be far from God. Whoever maintains that Christ passed through the Virgin as through a channel and was not fashioned in her in a manner at the same time divine and human—in a divine manner because [the conception occurred] without a man, in a human manner because Christ developed in her according to the principles of nature—is likewise godless. Whoever maintains that the human being was formed first, and later God descended upon him, is to be condemned.

Basil of Caesarea (330–378) wrote:

According to the blameless faith of the Christians which we have obtained from God, I confess and agree that I believe in one God the Father Almighty; God the Father, God the Son, God the Holy Ghost; I adore and worship one God, the Three. I confess to the œconomy of the Son in the flesh, and that the holy Mary, who gave birth to Him according to the flesh, was Mother of God.

Augustine of Hippo (354–430) wrote:

An Angel speaks to Zacharias; fertility is given to the barren; the priest comes forth dumb from the place of incense; John bursts forth into speech while yet confined within his mother's womb; an Angel blesses Mary and promises that she, a virgin, shall be the mother of the Son of God.

John Cassian (360–435) wrote:

Since then you said that God was born of Mary, how can you deny that Mary was the mother of God? Since you said that God came, how can you deny that He is God who has come?

And so you say, O heretic, whoever you may be, who deny that God was born of the Virgin, that Mary the Mother of our Lord Jesus Christ ought not to be called Theotokos, i.e., Mother of God, but Christotocos, i.e., only the Mother of Christ, not of God. For no one, you say, brings forth what is anterior in time. And of this utterly foolish argument whereby you think that the birth of God can be understood by carnal minds, and fancy that the mystery of His Majesty can be accounted for by human reasoning, we will, if God permits, say something later on. In the meanwhile we will now prove by Divine testimonies that Christ is God, and that Mary is the Mother of God. Hear then how the angel of God speaks to the Shepherds of the birth of God. There is born, he says, to you this day in the city of David a Saviour who is Christ the Lord. Luke 2:11 In order that you may not take Christ for a mere man, he adds the name of Lord and Saviour, on purpose that you may have no doubt that He whom you acknowledge as Saviour is God, and that (as the office of saving belongs only to Divine power) you may not question that He is of Divine power, in whom you have learned that the power to save resides.

=== Third Ecumenical Council ===
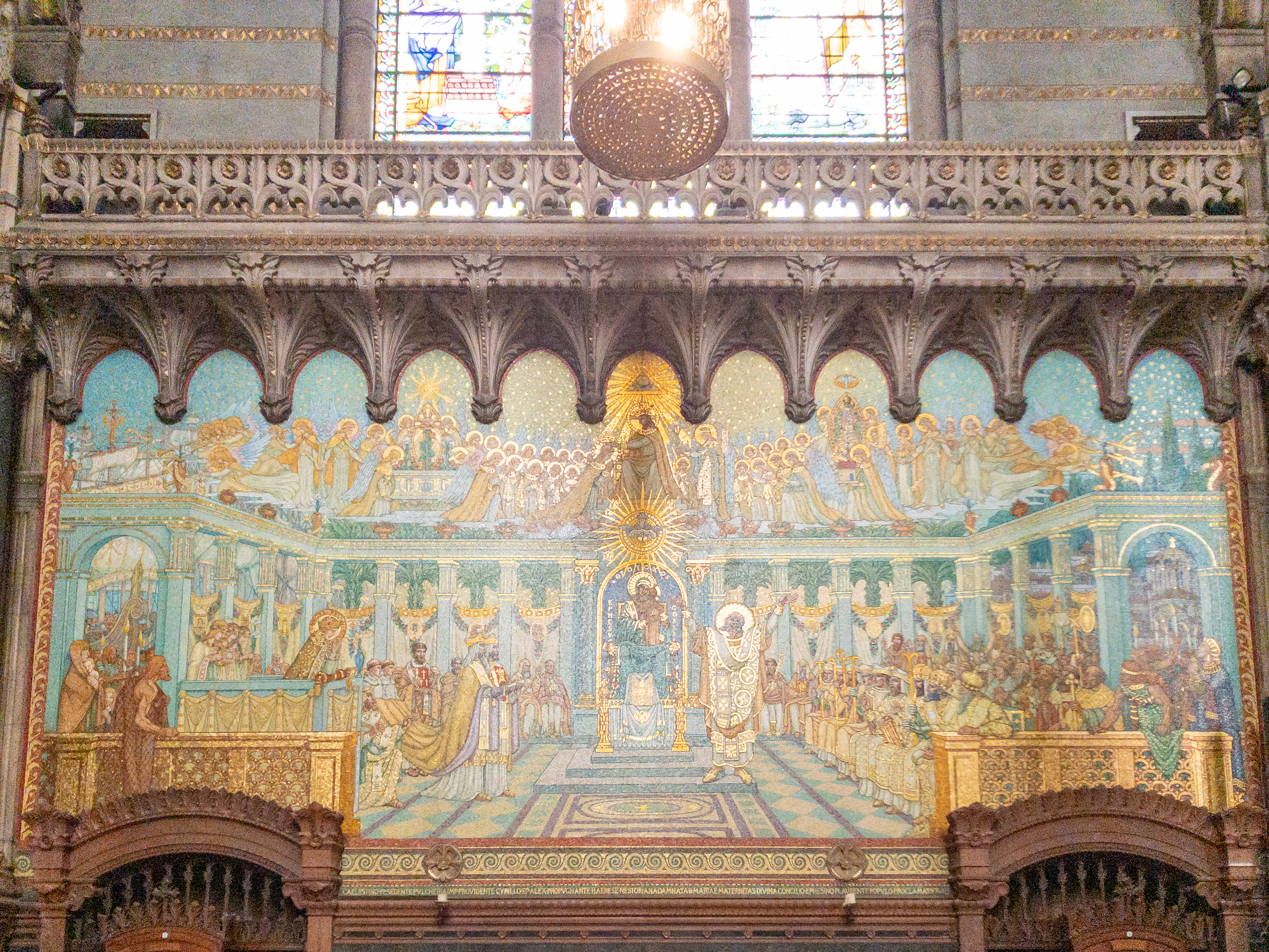
A mural in the Basilica of Notre-Dame de Fourvière in Lyon depicting Cyril of Alexandria defending his doctrine of one-nature in Christ and the term Theotokos at Ephesus, 431 AD. On the throne is the Virgin Mary and child Jesus.

The use of Theotokos was formally affirmed at the Third Ecumenical Council held at Ephesus in 431. It proclaimed that Mary truly became the Mother of God by the human conception of the Son of God in her womb:

Mother of God, not that the nature of the Word or his divinity received the beginning of its existence from the holy Virgin, but that, since the holy body, animated by a rational soul, which the Word of God united to himself according to the hypostasis, was born from her, the Word is said to be born according to the flesh.

The competing view, advocated by Patriarch Nestorius of Constantinople, was that Mary should be called Christotokos, meaning "Birth-giver of Christ," to restrict her role to the mother of Christ's humanity only and not his divine nature.

Nestorius' opponents, led by Cyril of Alexandria, alleged that this view, in conjunction with Nestorius's two-nature Christology, leads to two persons in Christ, which results in an incomplete incarnation and, by extension, incomplete salvation for mankind. The council accepted Cyril's reasoning and his one-nature Christology, affirmed the title Theotokos for Mary, and anathematized Nestorianism as heresy.

In letters to Nestorius which were afterwards included among the council documents, Cyril explained his doctrine. He noted that "the holy fathers... have ventured to call the holy Virgin Theotokos, not as though the nature of the Word or his divinity received the beginning of their existence from the holy Virgin, but because from her was born his holy body, rationally endowed with a soul, with which the Word was united according to the hypostasis, and is said to have been begotten according to the flesh" (Cyril's second letter to Nestorius).

Explaining his rejection of Nestorius' preferred title for Mary (Christotokos), Cyril wrote:

Confessing the Word to be united with the flesh according to the hypostasis, we worship one Son and Lord, Jesus Christ. We do not divide him into parts and separate man and God as though they were united with each other [only] through a unity of dignity and authority... nor do we name separately Christ the Word from God, and in similar fashion, separately, another Christ from the woman, but we know only one Christ, the Word from God the Father with his own flesh... But we do not say that the Word from God dwelt as in an ordinary human born of the holy virgin... we understand that, when he became flesh, not in the same way as he is said to dwell among the saints do we distinguish the manner of the indwelling; but he was united by nature and not turned into flesh... There is, then, one Christ and Son and Lord, not with the sort of conjunction that a human being might have with God as in a unity of dignity or authority; for equality of honor does not unite natures. For Peter and John were equal to each other in honor, both of them being apostles and holy disciples, but the two were not one. Nor do we understand the manner of conjunction to be one of juxtaposition, for this is insufficient in regard to natural union.... Rather we reject the term 'conjunction' as being inadequate to express the union... [T]he holy virgin gave birth in the flesh to God united with the flesh according to hypostasis, for that reason we call her Theotokos... If anyone does not confess that Emmanuel is, in truth, God, and therefore that the holy virgin is Theotokos (for she bore in a fleshly manner the Word from God become flesh), let him be anathema. (Cyril's third letter to Nestorius)

=== Nestorian schism ===
The Church of the East, the church which existed in the Sasanian Empire, was not involved in the councils of churches within the Roman Empire, and did not participate in the Council of Ephesus. The Church of the East came to accept the teachings of Nestorius's mentor, Theodore of Mopsuestia, as official doctrine, and was sometimes therefore called 'the Nestorian church', though modern scholarship has shown that this designation is theologically incorrect. The Church of the East was not outright opposed to using the term 'Mother of God' (in Syriac, its predominant language, ܝܠܕܬ ܐܠܗܐ), as long as this did not lead to the confusion of Jesus' two natures; for example, Babai the Great, a prominent Church of the East cleric and theologian, wrote in his Book of the Union that "because of the union, the blessed Mary is called Mother of God (ܝܠܕܬ ܐܠܗܐ) and Mother of Man - mother of man as from her own nature, and mother of God because of the union which he had with his manhood".

=== Reformation ===
Lutheran tradition retained the title of "Mother of God" (German: Mutter Gottes, Gottesmutter), a term already embraced by Martin Luther; and officially confessed in the Formula of Concord (1577), accepted by the Lutheran World Federation.

Whilst Calvin believed that Mary was theologically speaking rightly qualified as "the mother of God", he rejected common use of this as a title, saying, "I cannot think such language either right, or becoming, or suitable. ... To call the Virgin Mary the mother of God can only serve to confirm the ignorant in their superstitions."

=== 20th century ===
In 1994, Pope John Paul II and Patriarch of the Assyrian Church of the East Mar Dinkha IV signed an ecumenical declaration, mutually recognizing the legitimacy of the titles "Mother of God" and "Mother of Christ." The declaration reiterates the Christological formulations of the Council of Chalcedon as a theological expression of the faith shared by both churches, at the same time respecting the preference of each Church in using these titles in their liturgical life and piety.

== Liturgy ==
Theotokos is often used in hymns to Mary in the Eastern Orthodox, Eastern Catholic and Oriental Orthodox Churches. The most common is Axion Estin (It is truly meet), which is used in nearly every service.

Other examples include Sub tuum praesidium, the Hail Mary in its Eastern form, and All creation rejoices, which replaces Axion Estin at the Divine Liturgy on the Sundays of Great Lent. Bogurodzica is a medieval Polish hymn, possibly composed by Adalbert of Prague (d. 997).

The Solemnity of Mary, Mother of God is a Roman Catholic feast day introduced in 1969, based on older traditions associating 1 January with the motherhood of Mary. (Note: The 1969 revision of the liturgical year and the calendar states: "1 January, the Octave Day of the Nativity of the Lord, is the Solemnity of Mary, the Holy Mother of God, and also the commemoration of the conferral of the Most Holy Name of Jesus.") (Note: In his Apostolic Letter, Marialis Cultus, Pope Paul VI explained: "This celebration, placed on January 1 ...is meant to commemorate the part played by Mary in this mystery of salvation. It is meant also to exalt the singular dignity which this mystery brings to the 'holy Mother...through whom we were found worthy to receive the Author of life.'")

== Iconography ==
The tradition of Marian veneration was greatly expanded with the affirmation of her status as Theotokos in 431. The mosaics in Santa Maria Maggiore in Rome, dating from 432 to 40, just after the council, does not yet show her with a halo. The iconographic tradition of the Theotokos or Madonna (Our Lady), showing the Virgin enthroned carrying the infant Christ, is established by the following century, as attested by a very small number of surviving icons, including one at Saint Catherine's Monastery in Sinai, and Salus Populi Romani, a 5th or 6th-century Byzantine icon preserved in Rome. This type of depiction, with subtly changing differences of emphasis, has remained the mainstay of depictions of Mary to the present day. The roughly half-dozen varied icons of the Virgin and Child in Rome from the 6th to 8th centuries form the majority of the representations surviving from this period, as most early Byzantine icons were destroyed in the Byzantine Iconoclasm of the 8th and 9th century, notable exceptions being the 7th-century Blachernitissa and Agiosoritissa.

The iconographic tradition is well developed by the early medieval period. The tradition of Luke the Evangelist being the first to have painted Mary is established by the 8th century.

An early icon of the Virgin as queen is in the church of Santa Maria in Trastevere in Rome, datable to 705–707 by the kneeling figure of Pope John VII, a notable promoter of the cult of the Virgin, to whom the infant Christ reaches his hand.

The earliest surviving image in a Western illuminated manuscript of the Madonna and Child comes from the Book of Kells of about 800 (there is a similar carved image on the lid of St Cuthbert's coffin of 698). The oldest Russian icons were imports from Byzantium, beginning in the 11th century.

== Gallery ==
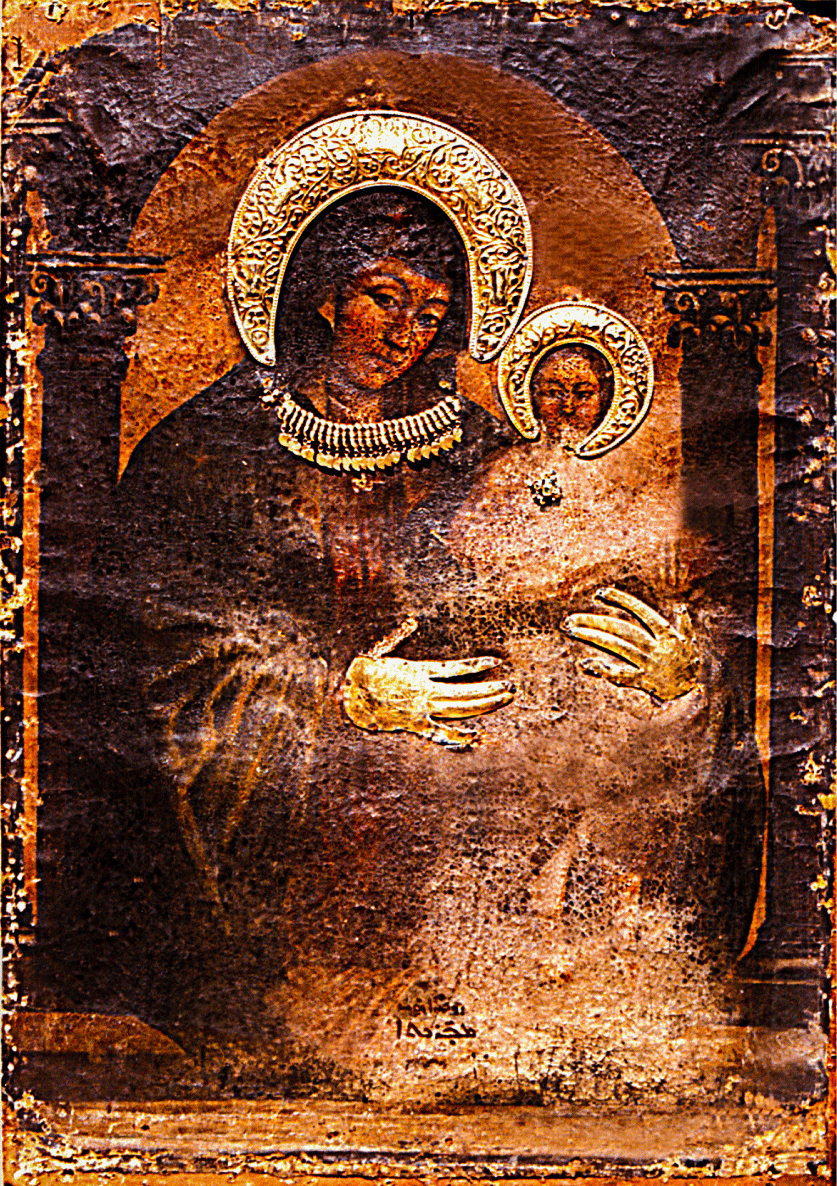
Icon in Monastery of Saint Mark, traditionally attributed to Luke the Evangelist

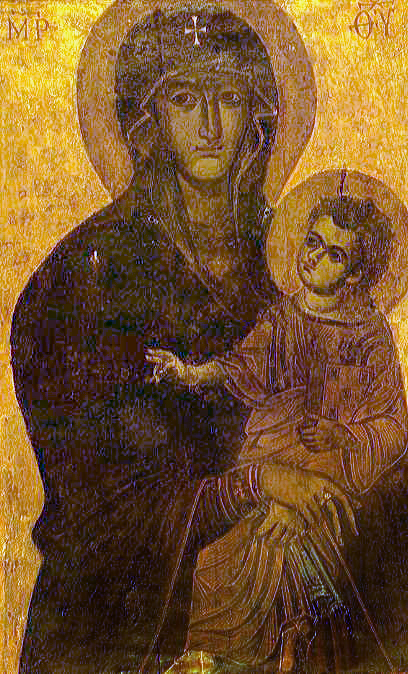
Salus Populi Romani, Rome, 5th or 6th ct.

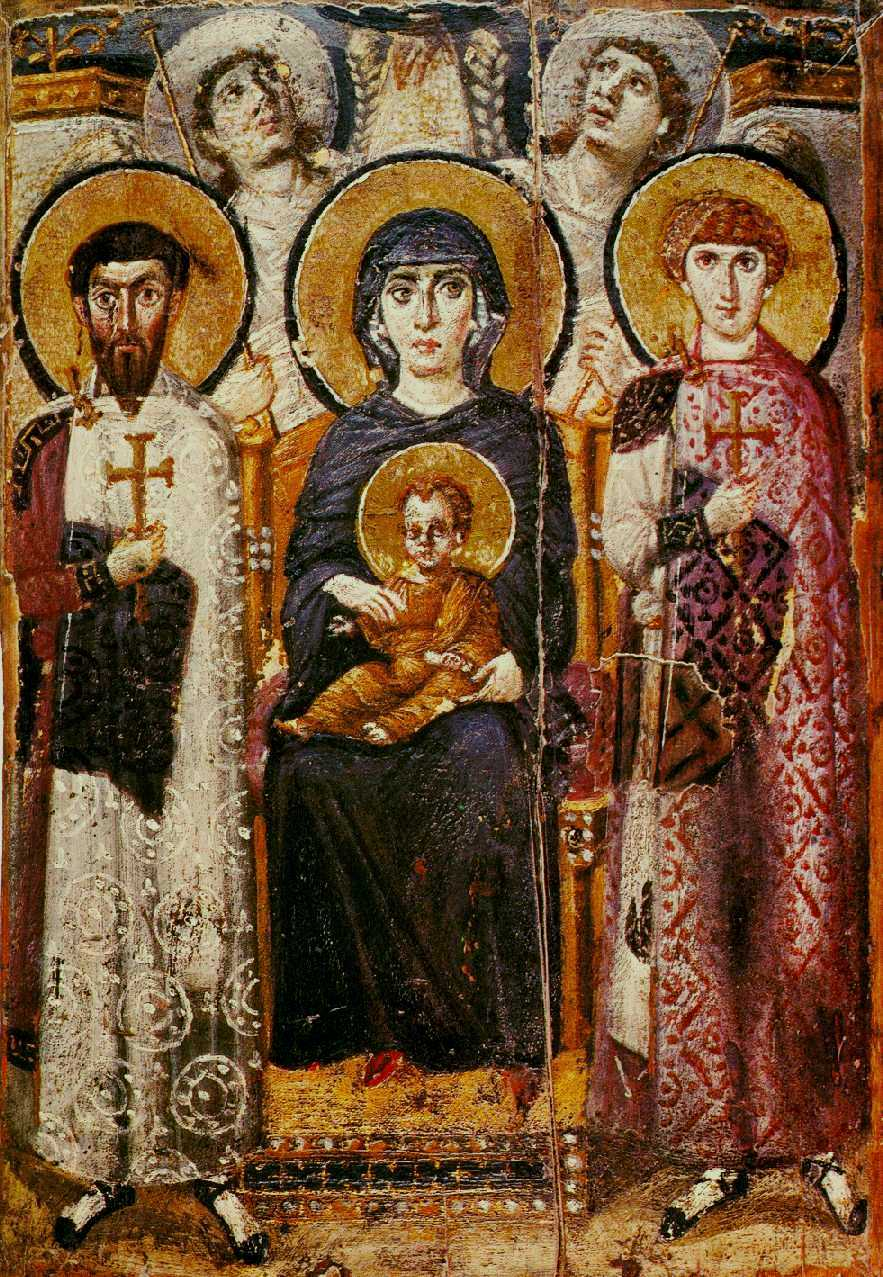
Encaustic icon, Saint Catherine's Monastery, Sinai, 6th ct.

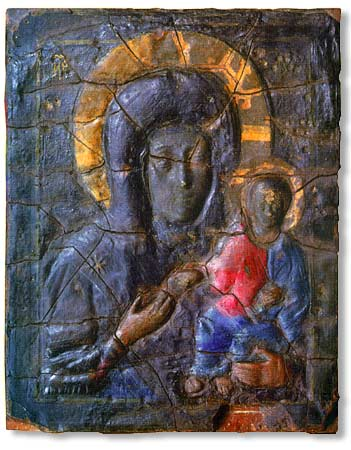
Blachernitissa, 7th ct.

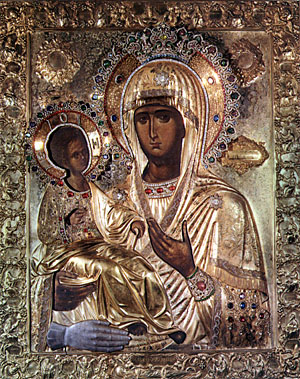
Trojeručica, c. 8th ct., Serbia

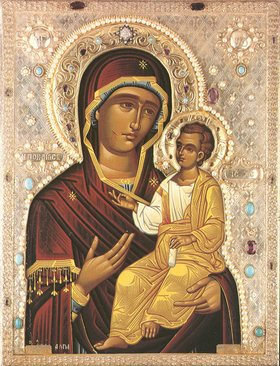
Iveron Theotokos, Iviron Monastery, Mount Athos, 11th ct.

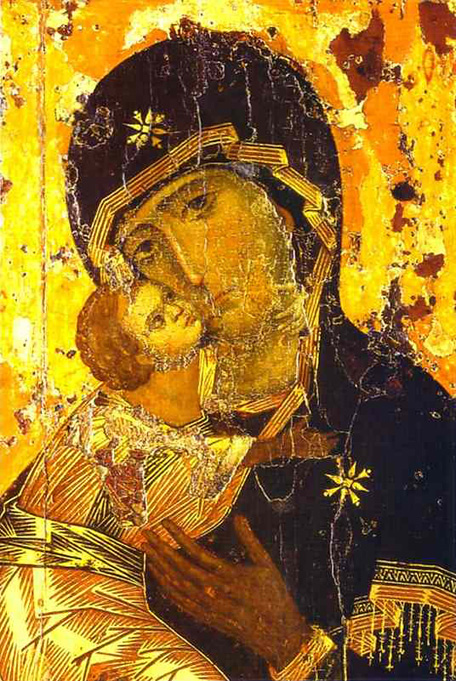
Theotokos of Vladimir, c. 1100

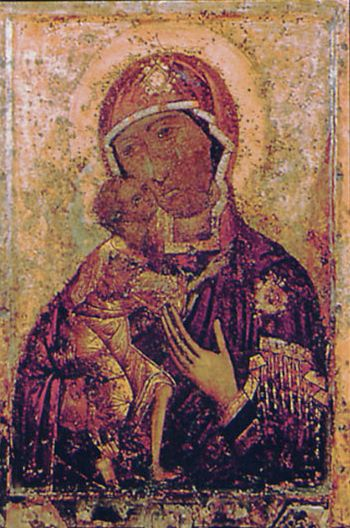
Theotokos of St. Theodore, 12th ct.

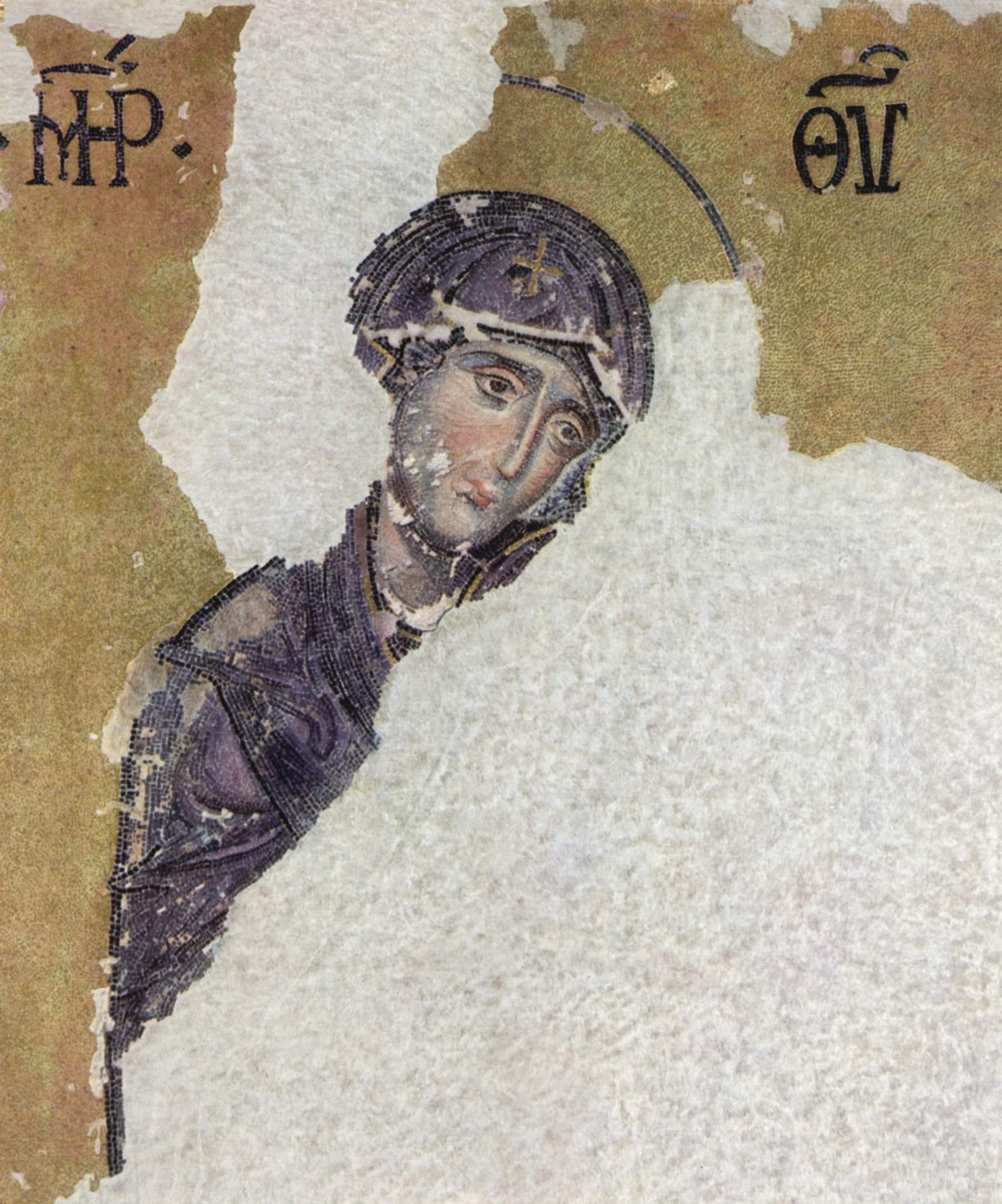
Mosaic icon, Hagia Sophia, 12th ct.

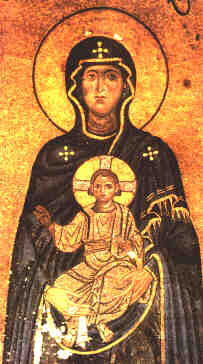
Mosaic, c. 1130, Gelati Monastery, Georgia

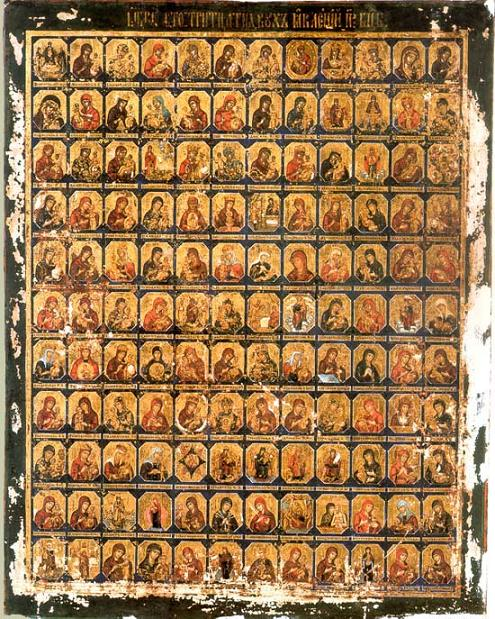
An 18th-ct. Russian chart of the various types of Bogoroditsa icons

== See also ==
- Anthropotokos
- Christotokos
- Hymns to Mary
- Mother of the Church
- Perpetual virginity of Mary
- Panagia Ierosolymitissa
- List of oldest Russian icons

== Sources ==
- Bethune-Baker, J. F. (1998). Nestorius and His Teachings: A Fresh Examination of the Evidence. Wipf and Stock Publishers. ISBN 978-1-57910-194-7.
- Braaten, Carl E.; Jenson, Robert W. (2004). Mary, Mother of God. William B. Eerdmans Publishing Company. p. 84. ISBN 0-8028-2266-5.
- Kazhdan, Alexander (1991). Oxford Dictionary of Byzantium. Oxford University Press.
- Kelly, J. N. D. (1965). Early Christian Doctrines. ISBN 978-0060643348.
- Migne, Jacques Paul (1857). Patrologia Graeca. Vol. 5.
- Percival, Henry, ed. (1916) [1900]. Nicene and Post-Nicene Fathers, Second Series. Vol. 14. New York City: Charles Scribner's Sons. OCLC 43516663.
- Witvliet, John (1997). "The Anaphora of St. James". In Bradshaw, Paul (ed.). Essays on Early Eastern Eucharistic Prayers.
