= Archimandrite Photius =

Russian priest and mystic (1792–1838)

Archimandrite Photius (Russian: Архимандрит Фотий, romanized: Arkhimandrit Fotii, secular name Pyotr Nikitich Spassky, Russian: Пётр Никитич Спасский; Julian calendar: 4 June 1792, Novgorodsky Uyezd – 26 February 1838, Novgorod) was an influential and reactionary Russian Orthodox priest and mystic. In 1822, he was appointed the Archimandrite of Yuriev Monastery in Novgorod. From 1823 to 1825, he and Alexey Arakcheyev plotted the downfall of Arakcheyev's political rival, Alexander Nikolaevich Golitsyn, Minister of Education and Spiritual Affairs. As in the later reign of Tsar Nicholas II, this was an age of rebellion, dissent and disputed succession, and Photius, a "theatrical and hypnotic character", has been compared to Rasputin.

== Biography ==
Photius arrived in Saint Petersburg in 1817 as a theology teacher to the Cadet Corps. In 1820 he began to preach in the Kazan Cathedral against the Evangelical Russian Bible Society, which he alleged was responsible for all the unrest among young Russians. He and others feared that there might be a Reformation in Russia. This impressed powerful sponsors, such as the immensely wealthy Countess Anna Orlova-Chesmenskaya, Arakcheyev, and Speransky's assistant, Magnitsky. In 1822 and 1824 Photius met Tsar Alexander I who regarded Photius as 'divinely inspired' and agreed to abolish the Masonic Lodges. Photius also pleaded for Golitsyn's dismissal. The Tsar hesitated, and Photius then confronted Golitsyn with a curse, later confirmed by Metropolitan Seraphim; 'Anathema! You will be damned!'. Golitsyn was thus forced to resign, his ministry was abolished, and control of the Bible Societies passed to the Orthodox Church; in 1826 Photius and Seraphim persuaded Nicolas I to abolish it altogether. It was a 'surreal episode of fanaticism' by a 'psychologically unstable' priest. Arakcheyev was the mastermind behind the plot and Photius continued to support him in later years, for example insisting that Arakcheyev's murdered mistress should be 'buried in holy ground'.

According to Czech scholar and president Tomas Masaryk, Arakcheyev and Photius "represent theocratic cæsaropapism at the close of Alexander's reign; they are the throne and the altar which Photius defended against the revolution."

Photius died in 1836, the same year he had previously predicted would see the start of the Apocalypse. Countess Orlova is buried alongside Photius near the Church of the Annunciation in Novgorod.

== In popular culture ==
Pushkin capitalised on the rumours of an affair with Orlova by writing three short satirical poems: Photius was a 'half saintly fool who means no good'; the countess 'pious on the whole/ To God devoted full her soul/ And gave her flesh without a fight/ To Photius, Archimandrite'.

== See also ==
- Alexey Arakcheyev
- House of Golitsyn
- Grigori Rasputin
