= Olisey Grechin =

Novgorodian icon painter

Olisey or Olisei Grechin (Russian: Олисей Гречин), also known as Olisey the Greek, was an icon painter from Novgorod, presumably of Byzantine Greek origin, active during the 12th–13th centuries. According to another version, Olisey was the son of a Novgorodian noble.

== Life ==
The birch bark manuscripts associated with Olisey are dated to 1196–1213. He is often assumed to have been of Byzantine Greek origin due to one of the letters having been written in Greek, while some others contain ligatures. Novgorodian chronicles also mention a painter called Grechin Petrovich under the year 1196, although it is unknown whether this was the same person. According to the other interpretation, Olisey was the son of the Novgorodian boyar (noble) Petr Mikhailovich, and the nickname Grechin ('Greek') was possibly given due to his knowledge of Greek or a period of residency in Byzantium, while the name Olisey (Elisha) was common in Novgorod at the time.

According to archaeological excavations, Olisey's residence was a 725–730 square metres (7,800–7,860 sq ft) plot of land fenced by wooden paling. In the east and south of the plot, there were wooden buildings. There were more than 4,600 finds, including fragments such as amphorae of Byzantine origin, which support the interpretation that Olisey was likely of Greek origin and had connections to Byzantium.

He was identified by Valentin Yanin as having been an abbot of the Yuriev Monastery from 1226. In 1229, he was a contender for the post of archbishop of Novgorod, but was not elected. In 1230, he was removed from his abbacy and died the same year following a six-week illness. However, some scholars have raised doubts about Yanin's hypothesis due to the number of roles attributed to one person. The murals of the Nereditsa Church have been attributed to him, and the similarity of their style to those found in Byzantine territory, including the Holy Land and Sinai, suggests close Greek–Russian and Palestinian–Russian contacts.

== Sources ==
- Androshchuk, Fedir (2014). "What does it mean to be Greek in Rus'? On identity and cultural transfer". In Nilsson, Ingela; Stephenson, Paul (eds.). Wanted, Byzantium: The Desire for a Lost Empire (Studia Byzantina Upsaliensia, 15). Uppsala Universitet. pp. 57–76. ISBN 978-9155489151.
- Makhanko, M. A. (2018). "Олисей Гречин". Православная энциклопедия. Т. LII: Ной — Онуфрий. Moscow: Православная энциклопедия. pp. 613–614. ISBN 978-5-8957-2059-2.
