= Anna Orlova-Chesmenskaya =

Russian courtier (1785–1848)

- Анна Орлова-Чесменская
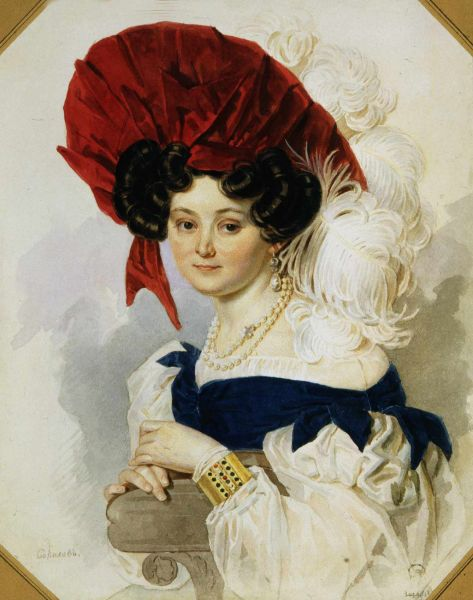
- Portrait by Pyotr Sokolov, 1830s
- Born: 13 May 1785
- Died: 17 October 1848 (aged 63)
- Occupations: Landowner; courtier
- Known for: her work against the serfdom in Russia and her piety, she acquired a saintly reputation.

Countess Anna Alekseyevna Orlova-Chesmenskaya (Russian: Анна Алексеевна Орлова-Чесменская; 13 May [O.S. 2 May] 1785 – 17 October [O.S. 5 October] 1848) was a Russian landowner and courtier. She was known for her work against the serfdom in Russia. Also known for her piety, she acquired a saintly reputation.

== Life ==
Anna was born on 2 May 1785 (O.S.) in Moscow, Russia. Anna was the daughter of count Alexei Orlov and Eudoxia Lopukhina, who died in 1786 after giving birth to Anna's brother, Ivan. Ivan did not survive infancy (1786–1787). As the only surviving child, Anna was heir to enormous estates in Karelia and a fortune of millions, all of which she inherited after the death of her father in 1808. Anna was introduced to Saint Petersburg aristocratic society by her father, but never married. She was appointed maid of honor to the empress in 1817, which was not an honorary position but a profession which tasks she fulfilled, such as accompanying the empress on journeys.

After the death of her father in 1808, she took control of her land and fortune, and became famed for her piety and work for the Orthodox church. Under the influence of young monk Archimandrite Photius from the Yuriev Monastery, she made pilgrimages and made large donations to Orthodox convents and churches. During Orlova's lifetime, "Photius and his colleagues milked her for twenty-five million roubles, US$ 740 million in today's money and five per cent of the Russian crown's entire annual revenue as of 1833."

She died on 5 October 1848. Countess Orlova and her confessor Photius were buried in the Yuriev Monastery, in the Church of the Transfiguration which they had built. A well-known epigram by Alexander Pushkin implies they were lovers:

"One woman, pious on the whole
To God devoted full her soul,
And gave her flesh without a fight
To Photius, Archimandrite."

== Sources ==
- kansallisbiografia (Finlands nationalbiografi)
