= Novlenskoye =

Novlenskoye Новленское
- Selo
- Location within Vologda Oblast Location within Russia
- Coordinates: 59°37′N 39°20′E
- Country: Russia
- Region: Vologda Oblast
- District: Vologodsky District
- Time zone: UTC+3:00

Novlenskoye (Russian: Новленское) is a rural locality (a selo) and the administrative center of Novlenskoye Rural Settlement, Vologodsky District, Vologda Oblast, Russia. The population was 825 as of 2002. There are 16 streets.

== Geography ==
Novlenskoye is located next to Lake Kubenskoye. Novlenskoye is located 58 km northwest of Vologda (the district's administrative centre) by road. Dmitriyevskoye is the nearest rural locality.
