= Saint George (icon, 1130) =

12th-century Russian icon of Saint George

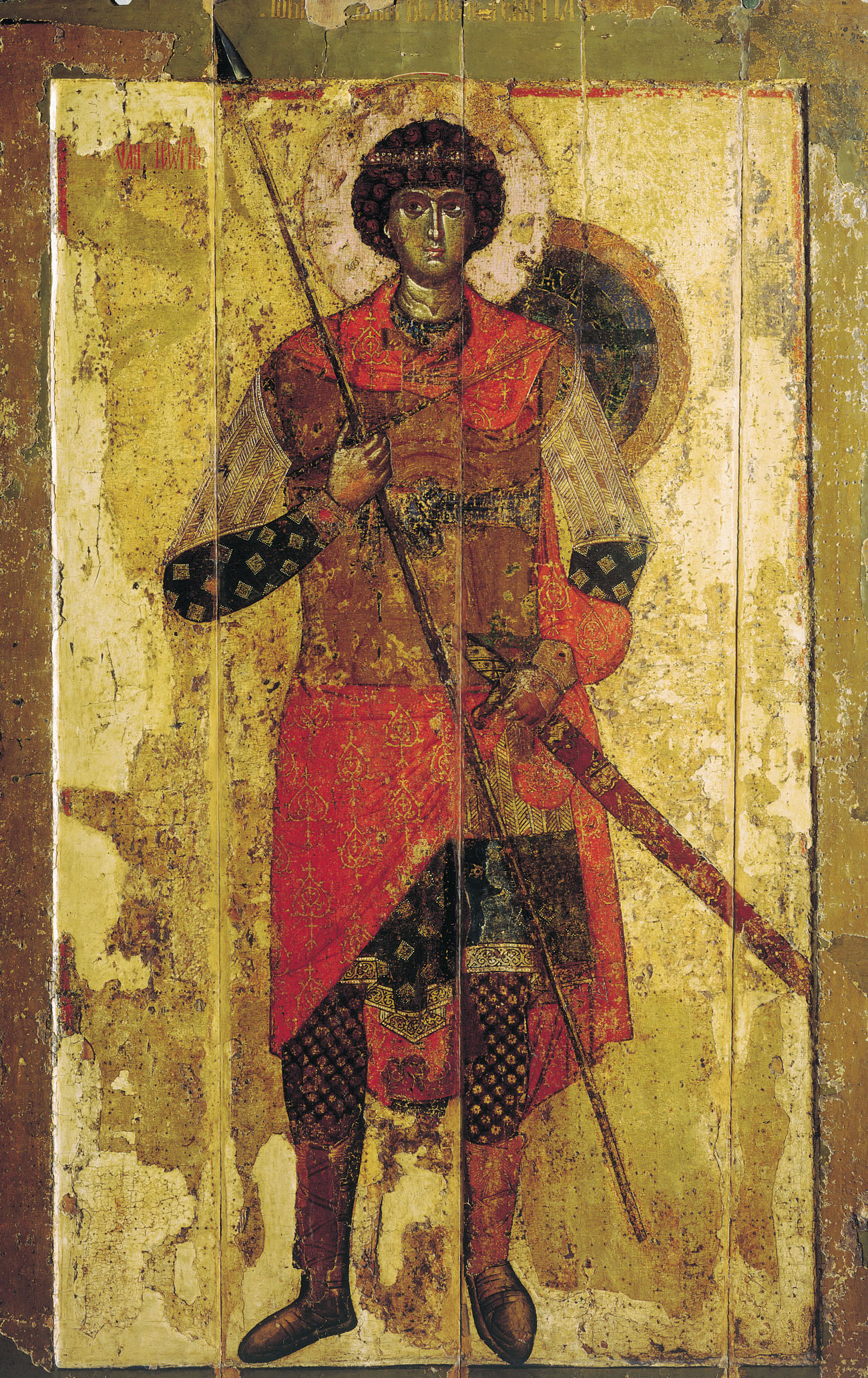
- Artist: unknown
- Year: c. 1130
- Medium: Tempera
- Dimensions: 230 cm × 142 cm (91 in × 56 in)
- Location: Tretyakov Gallery, Moscow

Saint George (Russian: Святой Георгий) is a Russian icon of Saint George painted in Novgorod by an unknown artist. It was the main icon of the Yuriev Monastery before it was moved to the Tretyakov Gallery in Moscow.

The year it was painted is unknown, but 1130 is commonly given and is based on the inscription with this year on the back of the icon. However, the back itself was only made in the 19th century. Art critics also give the year 1030, which is when the Yuriev Monastery was founded, or 1130s–1140s, when the consecration ceremony for the Saint George Cathedral in the monastery was held. This theory is supported by art historians Viktor Lazarev, Engelina Smirnova and Natalya Salko. Viktor Lazarev states that its size is suitable for that purpose.

The iconography corresponds to the common Byzantine depiction (from the 10th century) of Saint George not as a warrior, but as a young martyr.

== See also ==
- List of oldest Russian icons
