= Procopius of Ustyug =

Eastern Orthodox saint (died 1303)

Saint Procopius of Ustyug
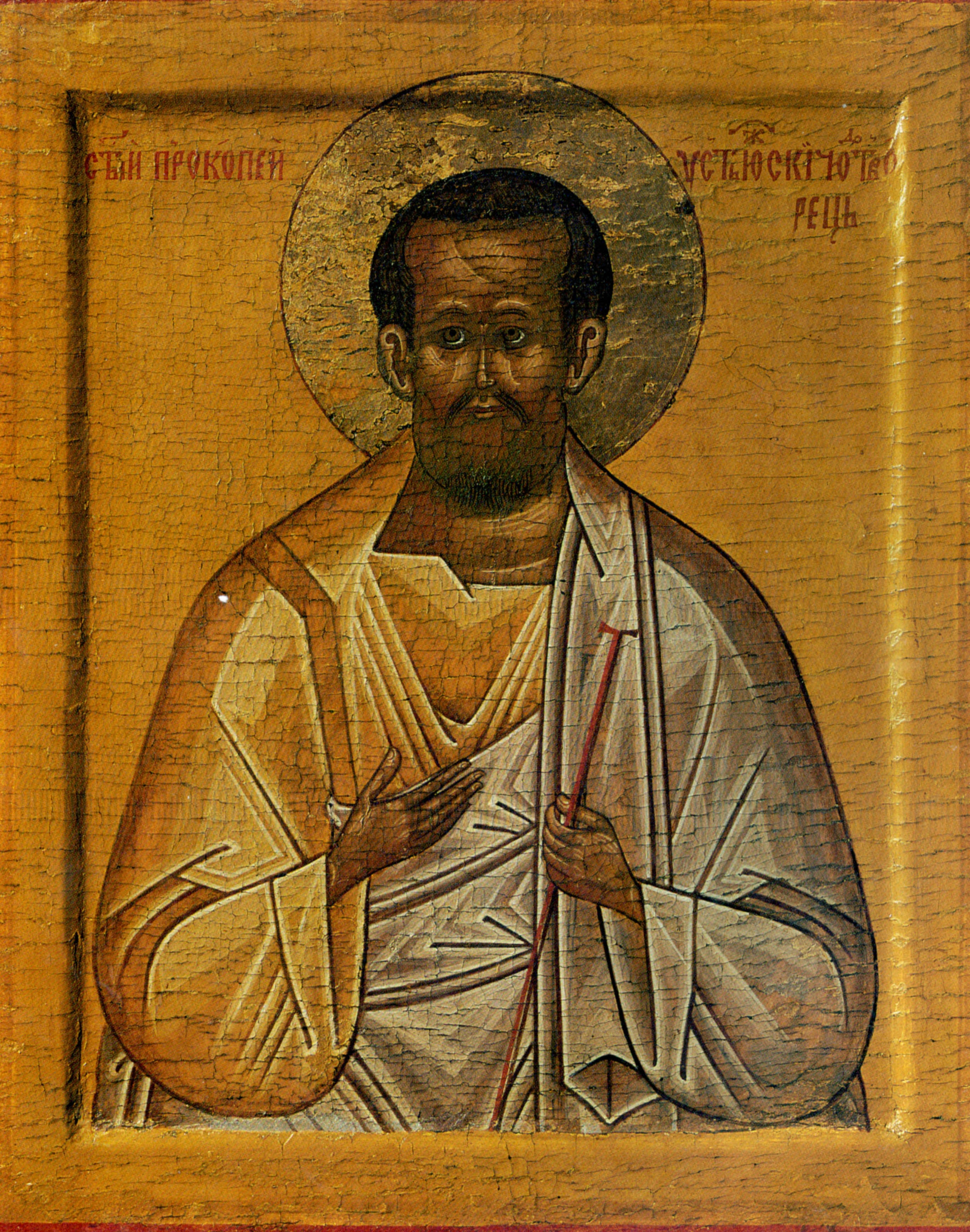
- 16th-century Russian icon

Wonderworker and Fool for Christ
- Born: Lübeck, Free City of Lübeck, Holy Roman Empire
- Died: July 8, 1303; Veliky Ustyug, Vladimir-Suzdal
- Venerated in: Eastern Orthodox Church
- Canonized: 1547 by Russian Orthodox Church
- Feast: July 8

Procopius of Ustyug (Russian: Прокопий Устюжский) or Procopius of Lübeck (Russian: Прокопий Любекский; German: Prokop(ius) von Ustjug und Lübeck; died July 8, 1303) was a fool for Christ (yurodivy) and miracle worker, formerly a merchant from Lübeck. He was canonized as a saint by the Russian Orthodox Church.

== Life ==
Though he is sometimes identified as one Jacob Potharst, son of a Lübeck merchant, Procopius' worldly name, surname, date and place of birth are not reliably determined. In 1818, the universal celebration of the saint was established.

Born in Lübeck, Germany, he was a Roman Catholic merchant who converted to Eastern Orthodox Christianity during his travels.

St. Procopius lived as a fool for Christ (yurodivy) for 60 years. In 1290, he predicted the fall of a meteorite near Veliky Ustyug, as well as tornado and conflagration. He died on 8 July 1303.

== Veneration ==
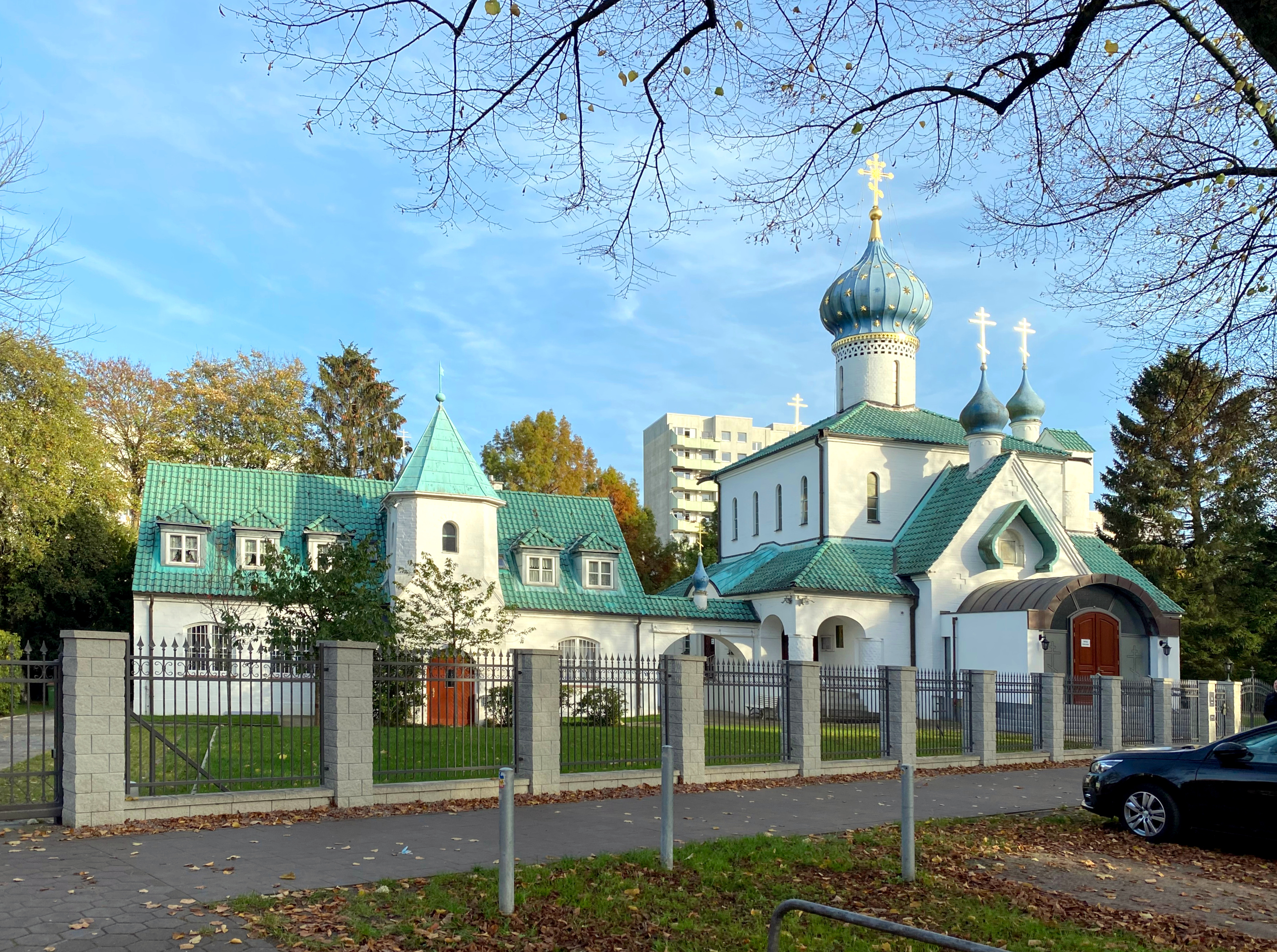
St. Prokop in Hamburg

Procopius was canonized as a saint by the Russian Orthodox Church in 1547.

The incorrupt relics of St. Procopius were discovered in the 18th century near the Entrance of the Theotokos to the Temple Church in Veliky Ustyug and placed in the church, where they remained in open view for two hundred years, being the putative source of numerous healings.

In the 1960s, the church St. Prokop was built in Hamburg, Germany, by the Russian Orthodox Church Outside of Russia.
