= Anthropotokos =

Title of Mary

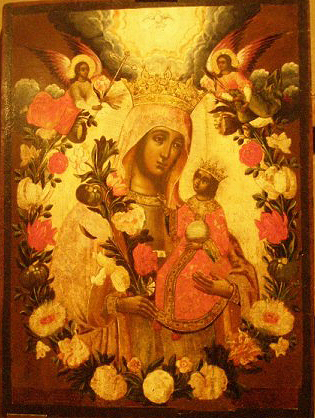
Russian icon of Mary "Neuvyadaemii cvet" (Неувядаемый Цвет), XVIII, Tretyakov Gallery, 18th-century

Anthropotokos (Greek: ἀνθρωποτόκος) is a title that was ascribed to Mary the Mother of Jesus by certain Christians around the time of the Nestorian debates. It literally means "the one who gives birth to a man" (ἄνθρωπος, man; τόκος, parturition, childbirth), but is also loosely translated as "mother of man", parallel to and contrasted with theotokos. Both Cyril of Alexandria (representing the Alexandrian viewpoint) and Nestorius (representing the Antiochene viewpoint) rejected the use of this word.
