= Veliky Ustyug (pseudometeorite) =

Doubtful meteorite

- Country: Russia
- Region: Kotovo village, Vologda Oblast
- Coordinates: 60°54′35″N 46°10′21″E
- Fall date: July 3, 1290
- Found date: July 3, 1290
- Alternative names: Velikoi-Ustyug

Veliky Ustyug (Russian: Великий Устюг) is a pseudometeorite that fell on July 3, 1290 (Julian calendar: June 24) in Kotovo village, near the town of Veliky Ustyug, Vologda Oblast, Russia. The fall was witnessed by local priests. The event was later described in the Life of Procopius the Righteous (Russian: Житие Прокопия Праведного; 16th century).

The pseudometeorite itself has been lost. Veliky Ustyug is included in the Meteoritical Bulletin Database as a doubtful meteorite.

Scientists of the Meteoritics Laboratory of the Vernadsky Institute of Geochemistry presume that the fall of the Veliky Ustyug meteorite is connected to the Tunguska explosion.

== See also ==
- Glossary of meteoritics
