= Yuriev Monastery =

Monastery in Novgorod, Russia

Coordinates: 58°29′15″N 31°17′07″E

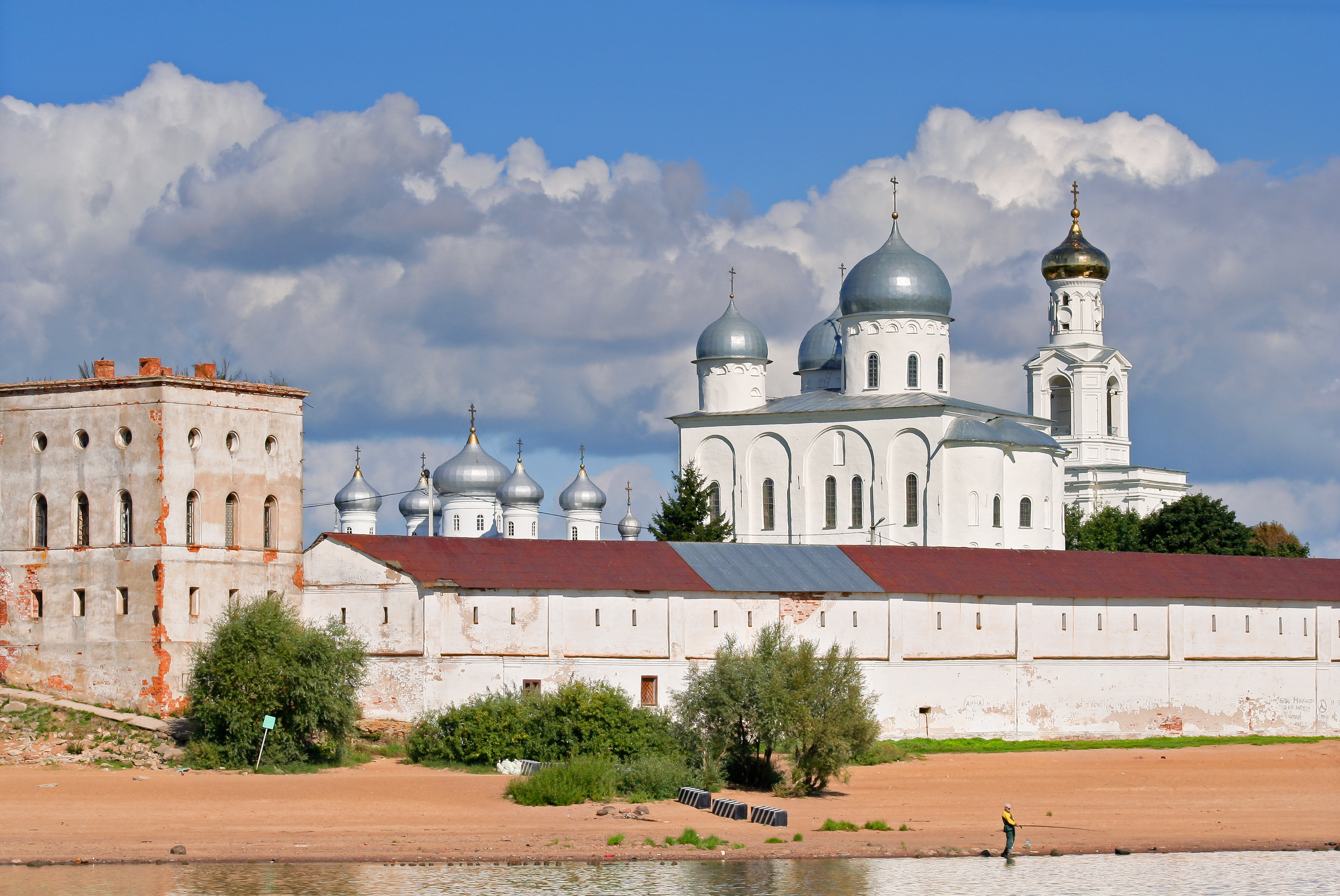
The monastery in 2010

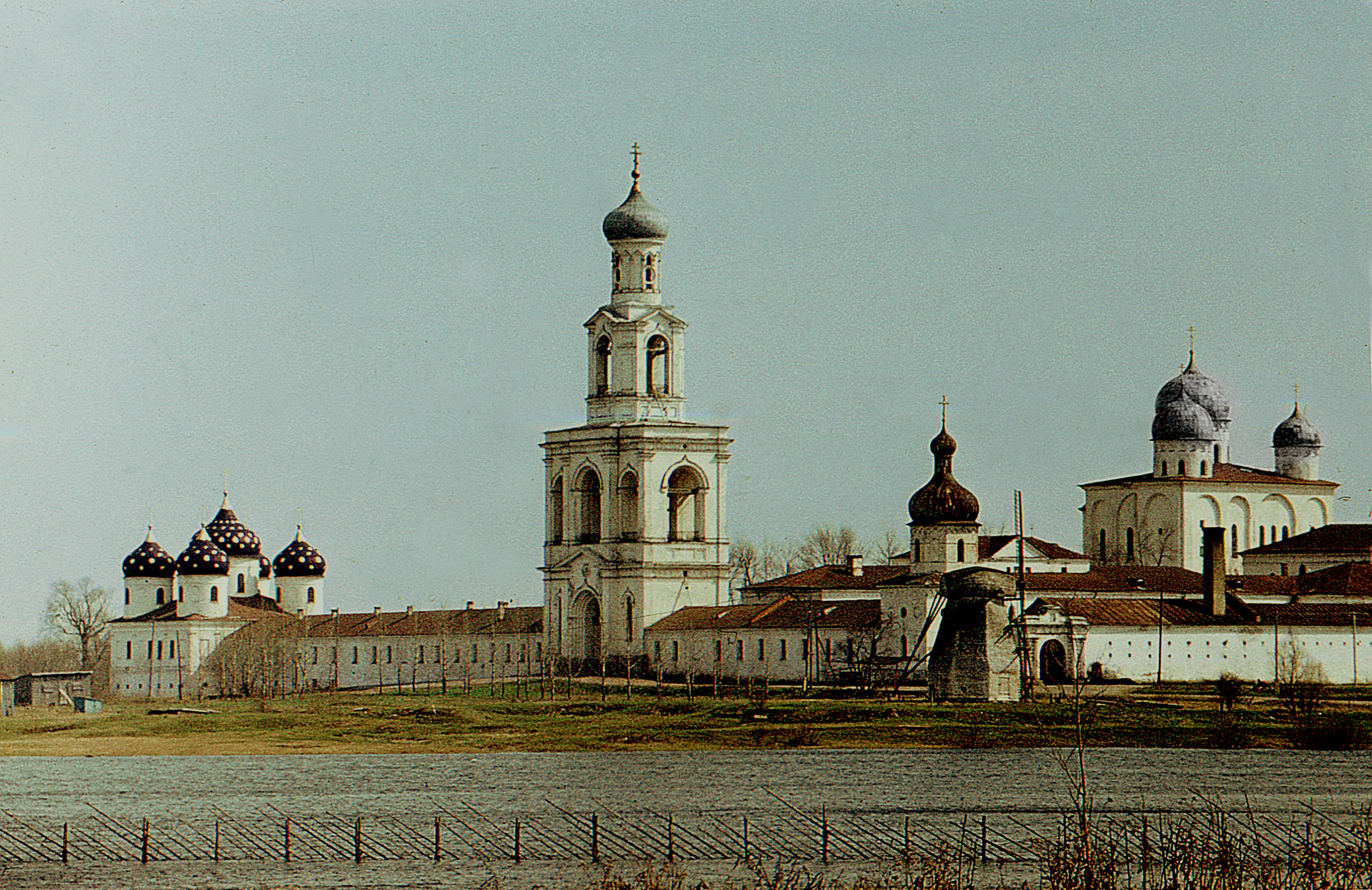
The monastery in 1976

The St. George's (Yuriev) Monastery (Russian: Юрьев монастырь, romanized: Yur'ev monastyr') is usually cited as Russia's oldest monastery. It stands in 5 kilometers south of Novgorod on the left bank of the Volkhov River near where it flows out of Lake Ilmen. The monastery used to be the most important in the medieval Novgorod Republic. It is part of the World Heritage Site named Historic Monuments of Novgorod and Surroundings.

== History ==
According to legend, the monastery of wood was founded around the year 1030 by Yaroslav the Wise whose baptismal name was George (Old East Slavic: Гюрьгi, Gjurĭgì) after Saint George. The first historically reliable reference to it is from the early 12th century when the stone building of the main church (the Church of St. George, Georgieveskii Church) was started in 1119 by Prince Vsevolod Mstislavich of Novgorod and Pskov and Hegumen (roughly equivalent to a western prior) Kyuriak (Kirik) and built by the master Peter.

By the first third of the 13th century the hegumen had been raised to the status of an archimandrite (roughly equivalent to an abbot, i.e., the head of an important monastery, although the comparison with western abbots is imprecise); Archimandrite Savatii is mentioned asking the Novgorodians to bless his successor just before his death in 1226. This has led some scholars to argue that the archimandrites of the Yuriev Monastery were elected by the veche, although there is very little evidence of this; in 1226 it appears that the Novgorodian elite approved the election of Savatii's successor although whether the veche took part is unclear. A later veche (more a mob than a governmental assembly in this case) held the Archimandrite Esif (Iosif - Joseph) overnight in the Church of St. Nicholas on the Marketplace in 1337. The chronicle does not say how the crisis was resolved, but the next year Esif was elevated to the Archimandrite of St. George after the death of Lavrenti. In 1342 he was sent to Koporye on a mission to secure Posadnik (burgomaster) Fedor Danilovich who was detained there. Russian monasteries at various times became guard-houses for prisoners of state. Also, in 1345, the church of St. George was renovated and new lead added to the roof under the direction of Archimandrite Esif.

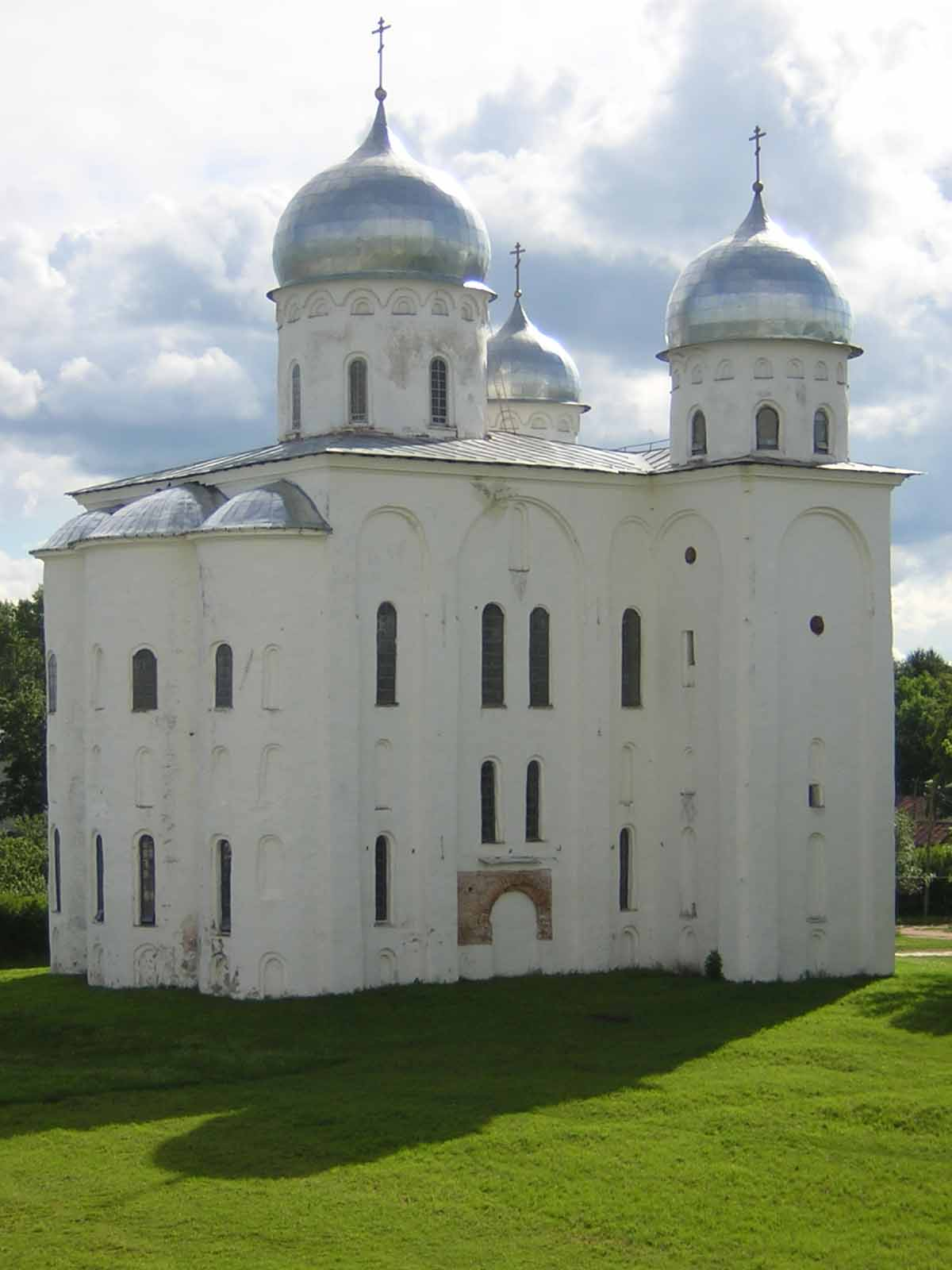
St. George's Cathedral was built in 1119

The archimandrites of the Yuriev Monastery were often called Archimandrite of Novgorod, as in 1270, when Varlaam "Hegumen of St. George's [the Yuriev Monastery] and Archimandtire of Novgorod" died. A listing of the "Archimandrites of Novgorod," is included in the back of the Novgorodian First Chronicle. In fact, the archimandrites of the Yuriev Monastery were, for several centuries, the only archimandrites in the Novgorodian Land, and thus they were, in a manner of speaking, the Archimandrites of Novgorod. Some scholars argue theirole in the Novgorodian church administration was more formal than that though, and they were the deputy to the archbishops of Novgorod or else they headed all the monasteries in the Novgorodian Land, this, however, remains uncertain. Archimandrite Sava was buried in the Antoniev Monastery, and several archimandrites built churches in other monasteries, perhaps indicating their power or influence over all the city-state's monasteries. Archbishop Spiridon (1229–1249) was a monk and deacon at the monastery before he was elected archbishop of Novgorod. Archbishop Moisei (1325–1330, 1352–1359) was archimandrite of the Yuriev Monastery before being elected archbishop, and Archbishop Feoktist was, according to some sources, buried at the Yuriev monastery (explaining the large fresco of him and a smaller icon in the Church of the Exaltation of the Cross), but other sources give another monastery, the Monastery of the Annunciation, as his place of burial. Prince Dmitry Shemyaka was also allegedly buried there.

The monastery played the role of Novgorodian princes burial place. In 1198 two sons of Yaroslav the Wise, Izyaslav of Luki and Rostislav, are buried in the Church of Saint George. In 1233 the elder brother of Great Prince Alexander Nevsky called Фёдор (Theodor), and in 11 years, in 1244, their mother called Феодосия (Theodosia) found the last resting in the church. Almost 200 years afterwards, when Swedish intervents had unearthed graves looking for lucre while invading the monastery during the Ingrian War (1610 - 1617), the remains of prince Theodor were found imperishable. They "put him out of grave and stand him leaned at wall, he was like alive". As the result, the great prince Theodor was canonized in Novgorod and is the local saint.

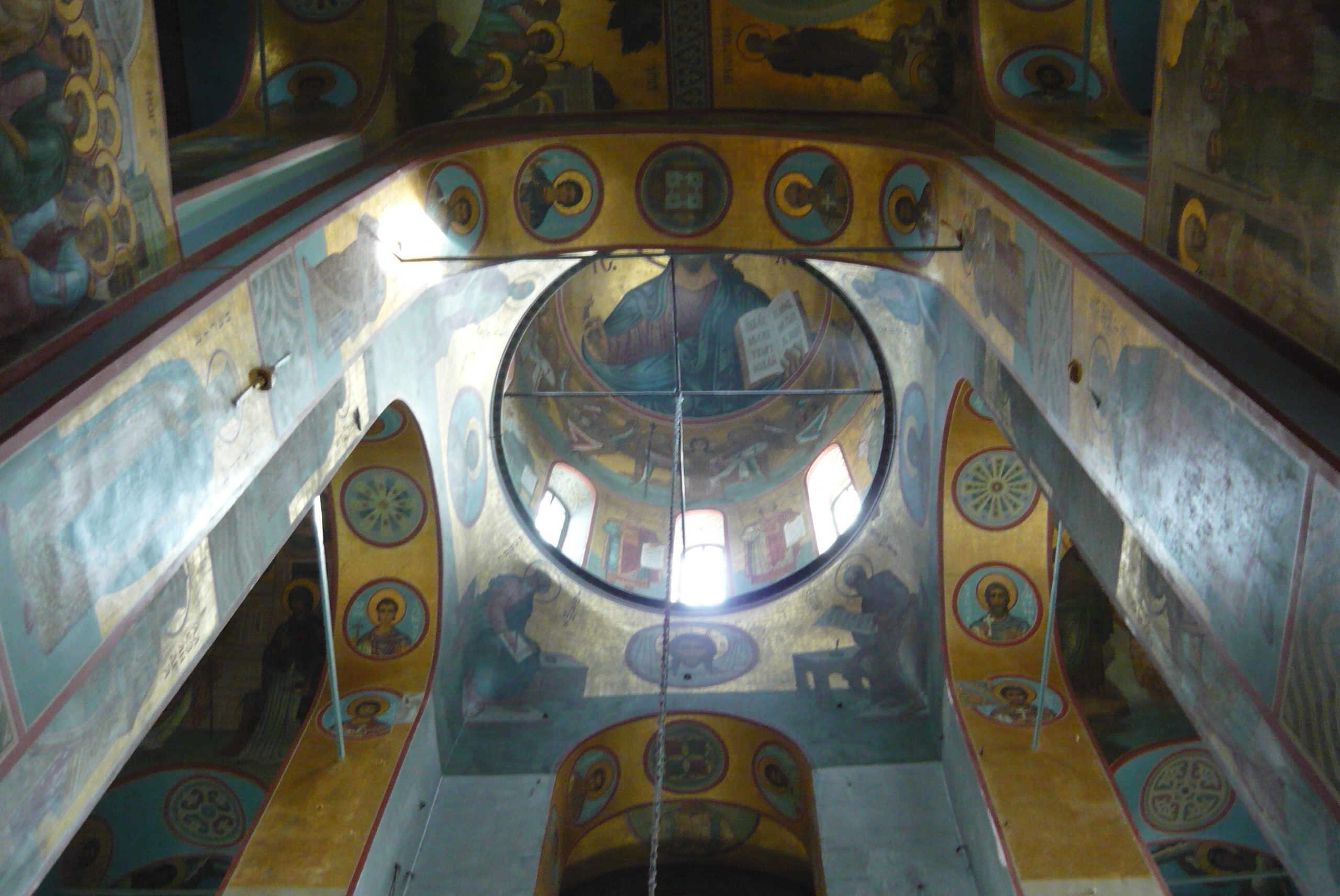
The katholikon has retained few traces of its original 12th-century wall paintings

The monastery was an important source for historical information on medieval Novgorod, as part of the Novgorod First Chronicle (the Synodal text) was compiled in the monastery.

The Church of St. George is one of the largest in Novgorod and its immediate environs. It is a tall (105 feet tall) white-stone church 85 feet long by 75 feet wide with three silver domes, which is somewhat unusual for Russian churches which usually have five (the main dome representing Christ, the four smaller ones representing the evangelists). Some remnants of the medieval frescoes remain, but most of the church was refrescoed in 1902. Among the frescoes is a large Christ Pantokrator in the main dome, a full-length portrait of Novgorodian Archbishop Feoktist, and another full-length (although smaller) portrait of Prince Vsevolod Mstislavich on the southwestern pier.

The monastery also has the Church of the Exaltation of the Cross in the northeastern corner of the monastery, with five blue domes and gold stars on it, built in the 18th century. The gateway into the monastery is crowned by a tall gold-domed tower which is visible from the city centre, including the Novgorod Kremlin two miles to the north.

The monastery owes its resurgence to the efforts of its powerful and energetic hegumen Archimandrite Photius (1792-1838) who persuaded Countess Anna Orlova, a wealthy spinster, to donate her immense funds to the eparchy. Both are buried in the penticupolar Church of the Transfiguration which they had built.

After the 1917 revolution, the monastery was ravaged. Five of its six churches were either destroyed or badly damaged by 1928; the monastery was closed in 1929. During the World War II, the buildings were occupied by the German and Spanish armed forces, and were seriously damaged. In 1991 the monastery was returned to the Russian Orthodox Church, and parts of it have been renovated since then. However the western part, including a church there, are still in ruins.

Some of the icons looted from the monastery by Ivan the Terrible

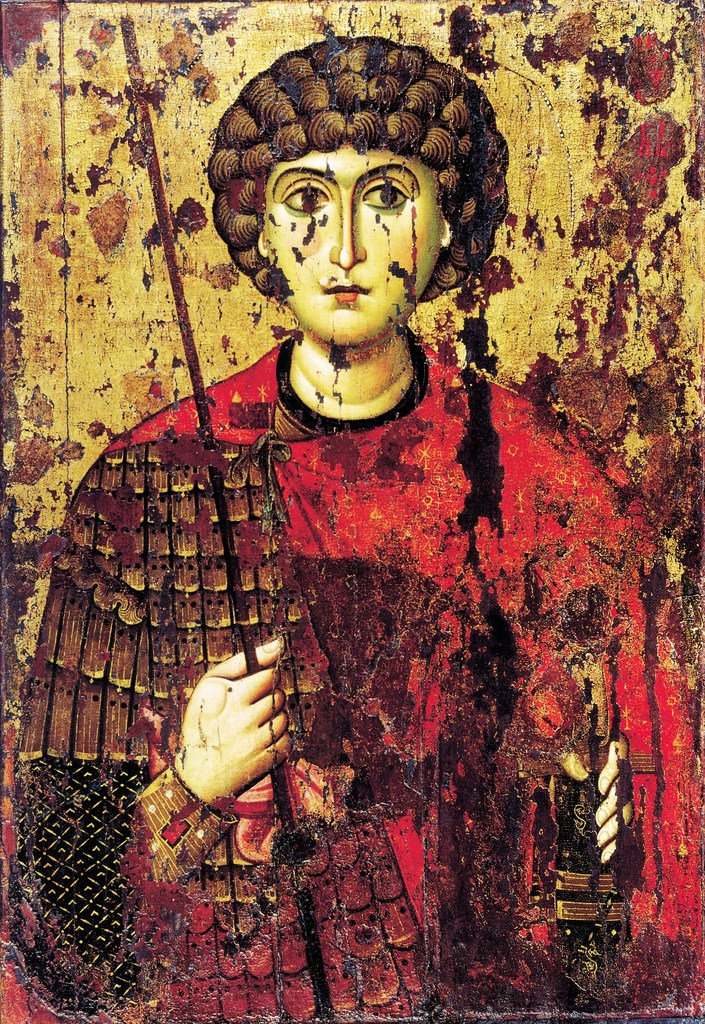
Saint George, one of the oldest icons in Russia

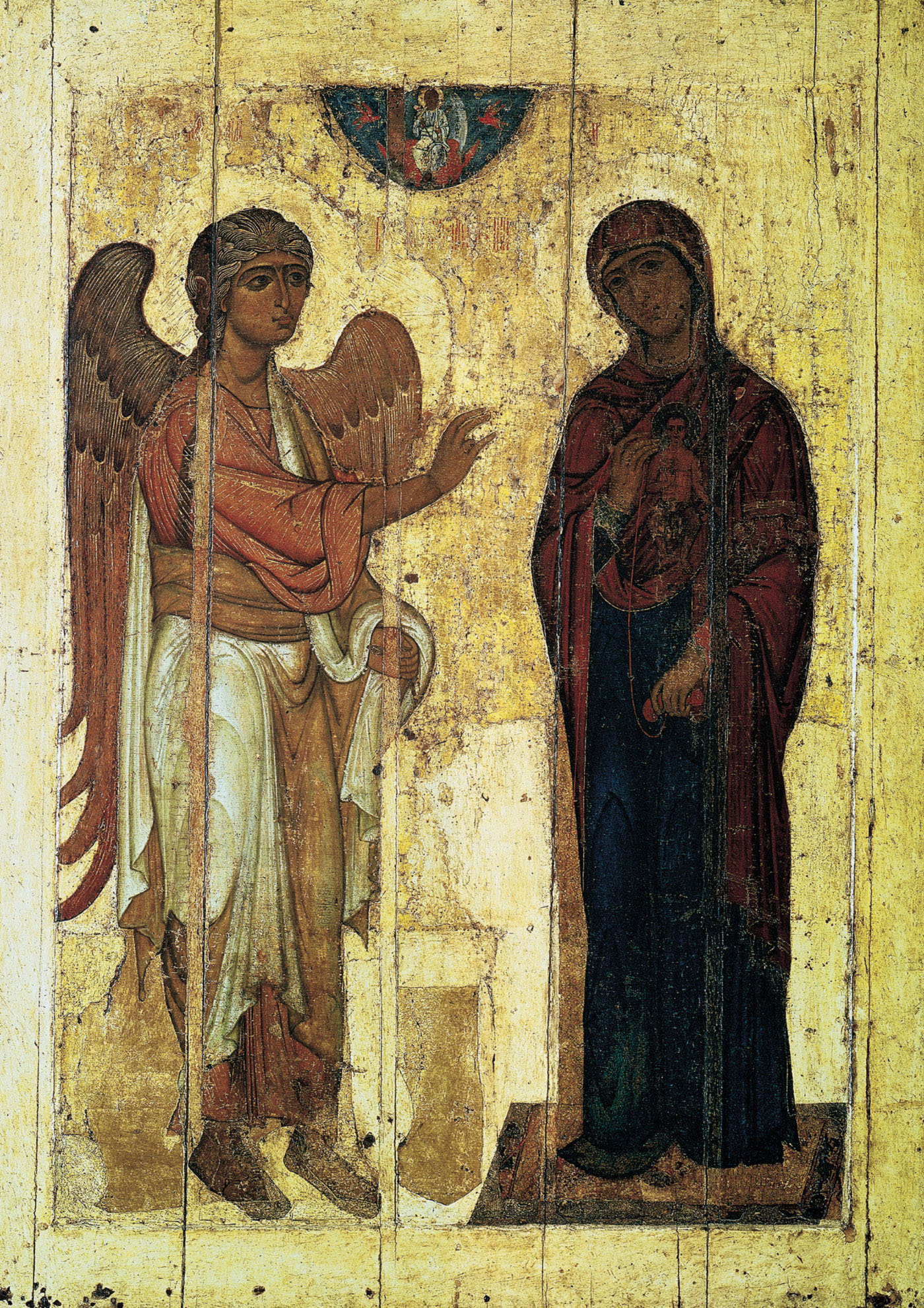
Ustyug Annunciation became the main icon of the Cathedral of the Annunciation, Moscow

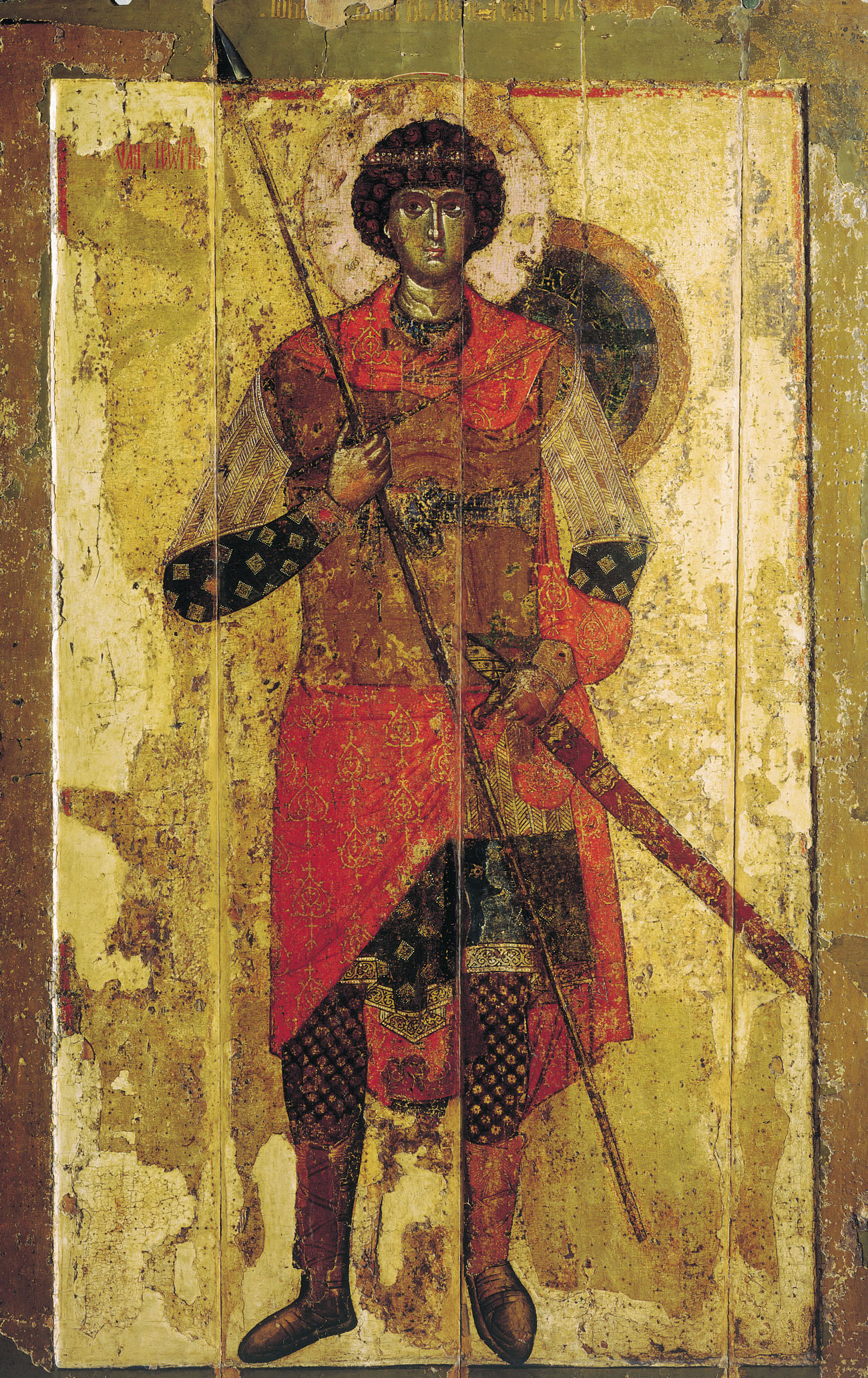
The main icon of the katholikon dates from ca. 1130
