= Spiritual labyrinth =

18th-century iconographic type in Russian icon painting

The Spiritual Labyrinth from the collection of the State Museum of the History of Religion
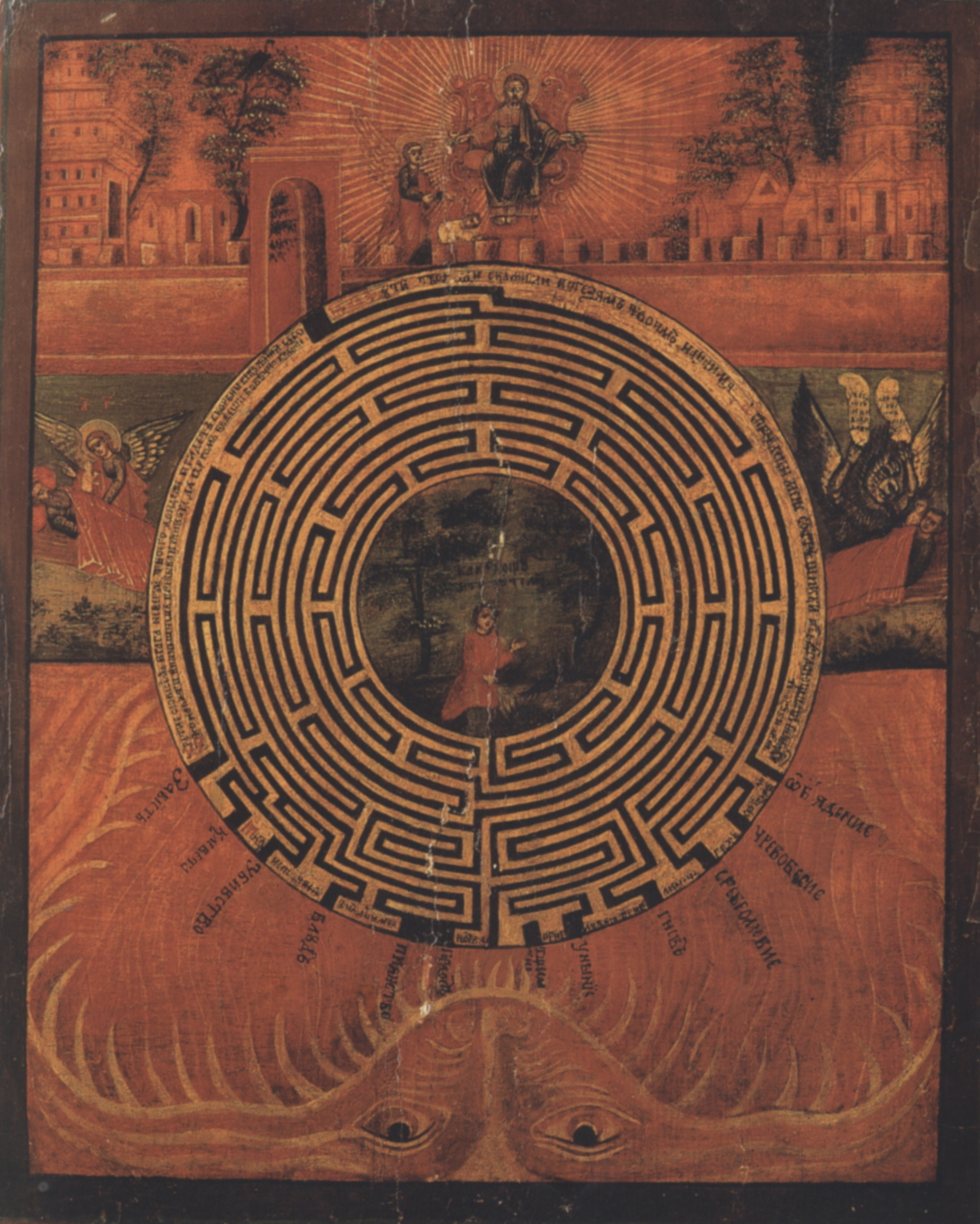
- Artist: Unknown
- Year: Late 18th century
- Type: icon
- Medium: oil on canvas
- Dimensions: 54 cm × 43.9 cm (21 in × 17.3 in)
- Location: State Museum of the History of Religion, Saint Petersburg, Russia

The spiritual labyrinth (Russian: «Лабиринт духовный») is a rare iconographic type in Russian icon painting, which researchers date to the 18th century (less commonly to the early 19th century). In the middle register of these icons is a labyrinth representation, in the upper part the New Jerusalem, and in the lower part the underworld. Contemporary art historians interpret such icons as a visual representation of the idea that the path to the New Jerusalem passes through the labyrinth of life, which is filled with dead ends and false paths. Such icons were not objects of religious veneration; they served didactic purposes. As of 2023, only two icons of this iconographic type have been identified in the collections of Russian museums and Orthodox churches. One is in the collection of the State Museum of the History of Religion in Saint Petersburg, and the second in that of the New Jerusalem museum in Istra in Moscow Oblast.

Researchers have made attempts to determine the origin of "spiritual labyrinth" iconography, advancing hypotheses regarding its underlying literary source, the influence of Western European and Russian engravings, as well as frescoes or floor images in Catholic churches. The appearance of these icons was also linked to the arrival in 18th-century Russia of the sect of the Herrnhuters, and this iconography was also examined in the context of the development of the "symbolico-dogmatic" trend in Russian icon painting in the late 17th and early 18th centuries. Contemporary Russian art historians and cultural scholars have attempted to determine the figurative meaning of the "spiritual labyrinth".

== Representation and symbolism ==
=== Icon from the New Jerusalem Museum ===
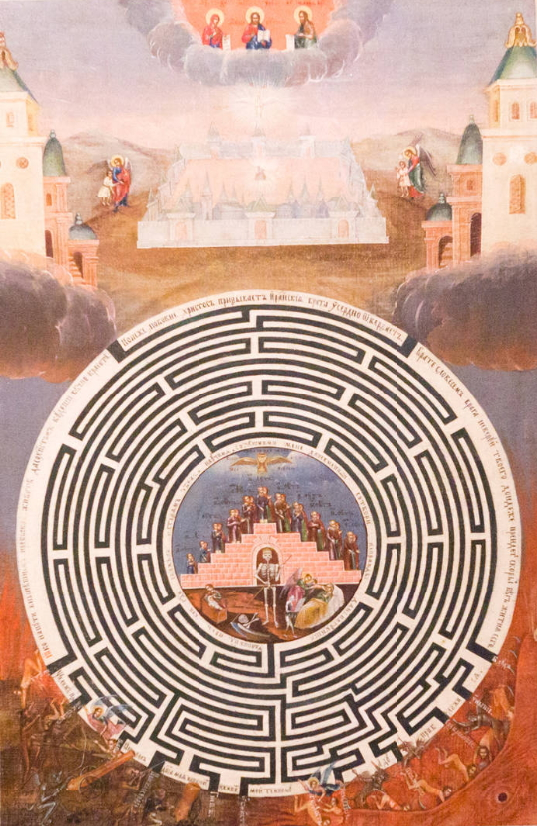
The Spiritual Labyrinth. New Jerusalem Museum

The greater part of the icon is occupied by a circular labyrinth. University of Warwick art historian Sergei Zotov considers this icon an expanded version of the iconographic type of the "spiritual labyrinth".

The ages of human life in the form of male and female figures are depicted at the center of the icon and the labyrinth, on the steps of a stone pyramid. From infant to decrepit old man, they are arranged on this distinctive staircase. Above each figure the age is written (from 1 to 90 years). There is an hourglass above the figures hovering on wings. It measures the span of human life. The image is accompanied by the inscription: "This time of God with the hours of day and night as if on wings". At the bottom are depicted scenes of birth and death (representing the beginning of human life and its end), and between them stands Death in the form of a skeleton with a crown on its head and a scythe in its hands. According to Zotov, the viewer perceives themselves in the position of a deceased soul and it is from the center that they begin their mental journey through the labyrinth depicted around them.

"The Spiritual Labyrinth". Video of icon fragments.

In its movement upward toward the New Jerusalem, the soul can read the inscriptions present on the icon: "As if dwelling on the path in the present life, be with Christ in eternal beauty" and "Brother, do not believe the words of your enemy, until the swift course of this life has passed". At the top there are two exits from the labyrinth. The wayfarer is greeted by the inscription: "Since Christ lovingly calls and diligently opens the gates of paradise". In the upper part of the icon is a depiction of the New Jerusalem itself with twelve gates, as well as pure souls, who are accompanied to the New City by two angels. Above the New Jerusalem, in clouds that serve as a cartouche, is a depiction of the Deesis. The Theotokos and John the Baptist appeal to the Lord with a plea for the salvation of the human race. Above the New Jerusalem, beneath the Deesis, the Holy Spirit hovers in the form of a dove.

If the viewers fail to navigate the labyrinth, they find themselves in the lower part of the icon. The inscription here reads: "For my soul is filled with evil and my life draws near to the dark underworld." Twelve roads lead to hell (art historian Natalya Merzlyutina counted only eleven) with the corresponding sins inscribed upon them, namely — fornication, despondency, avarice, drunkenness, vanity, pride, murder, anger, mercilessness, envy, slander, and gluttony. Before the entrance to the underworld on the left are depictions of demons armed with the newest types of weapons at that time (cannons and rifles, as well as bows), which, in Zotov's view, symbolize the passions. According to Dolgova, this is also a depiction of demons striking "the human race with sinful passions" (Galina Zelenskaya holds the same view). The mouth of the fiery Gehenna is shifted to the right on this icon. Among the demons, one can also make out angels drawing repentant souls from the underworld.

Fragments of the "Spiritual Labyrinth" from the New Jerusalem Museum
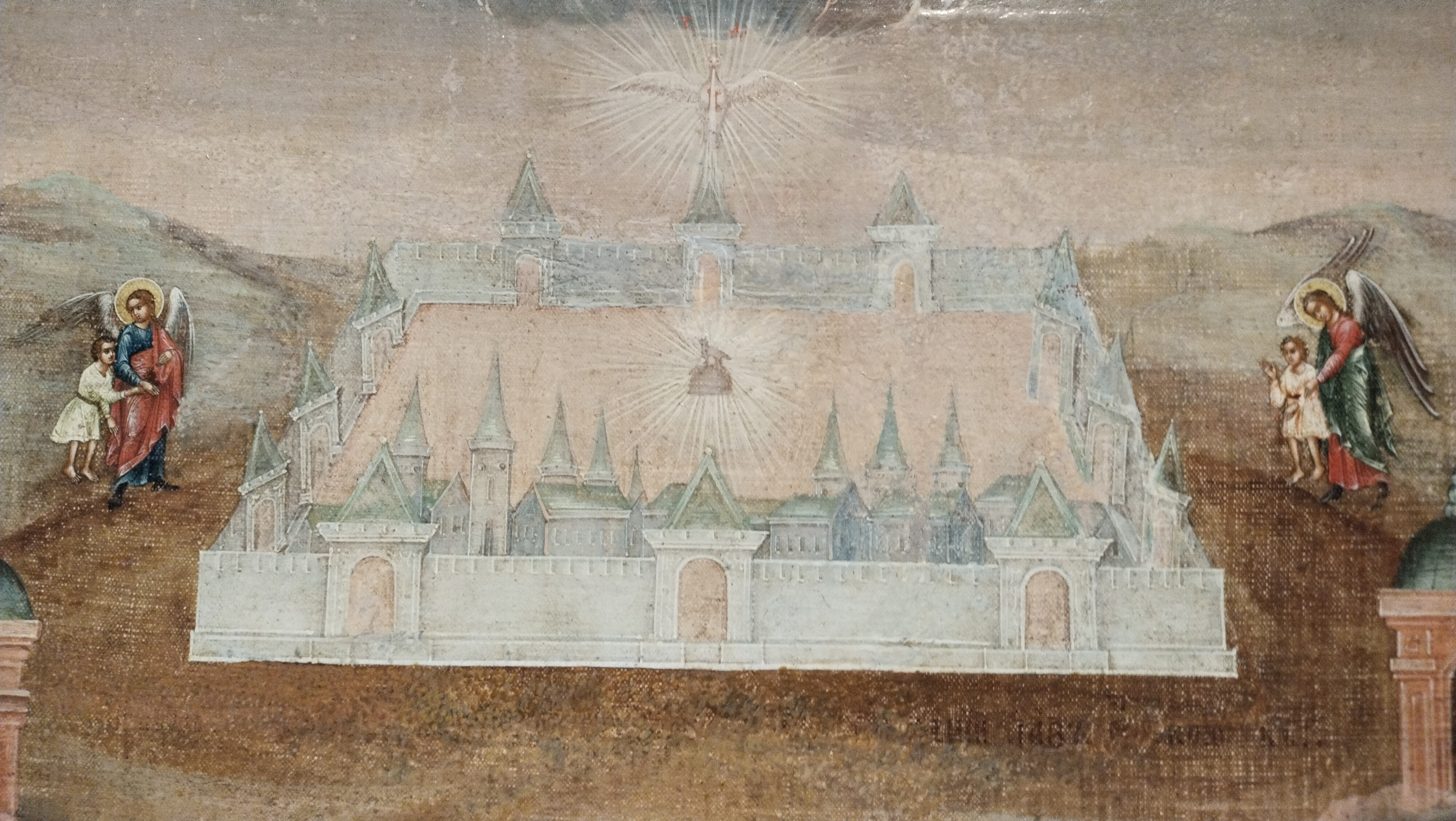
New Jerusalem

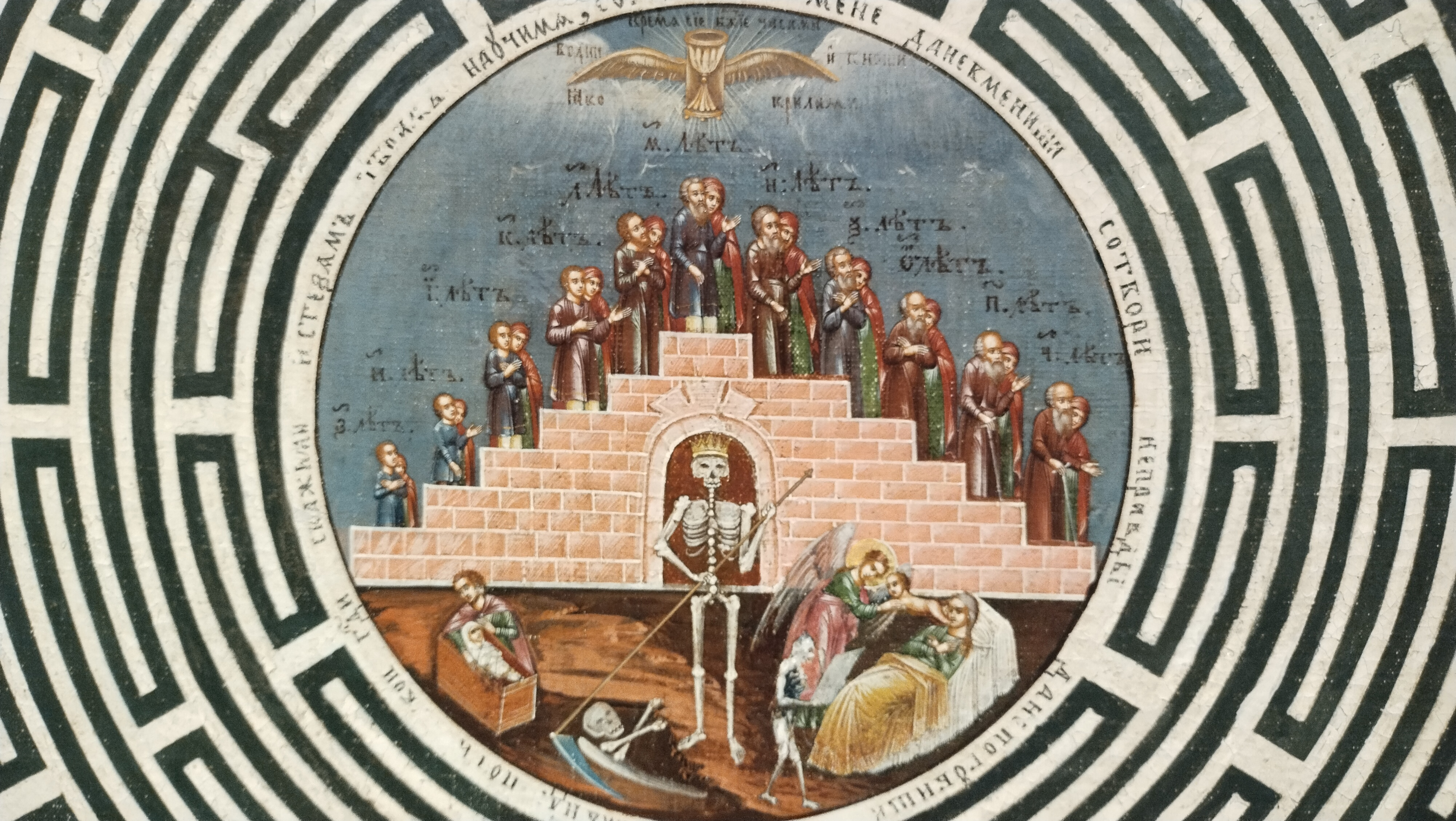
Central part. On the lower left step the age of children is ζ (7) years, on the upper step — μ (40) years, on the lower right — ϟ (90) years

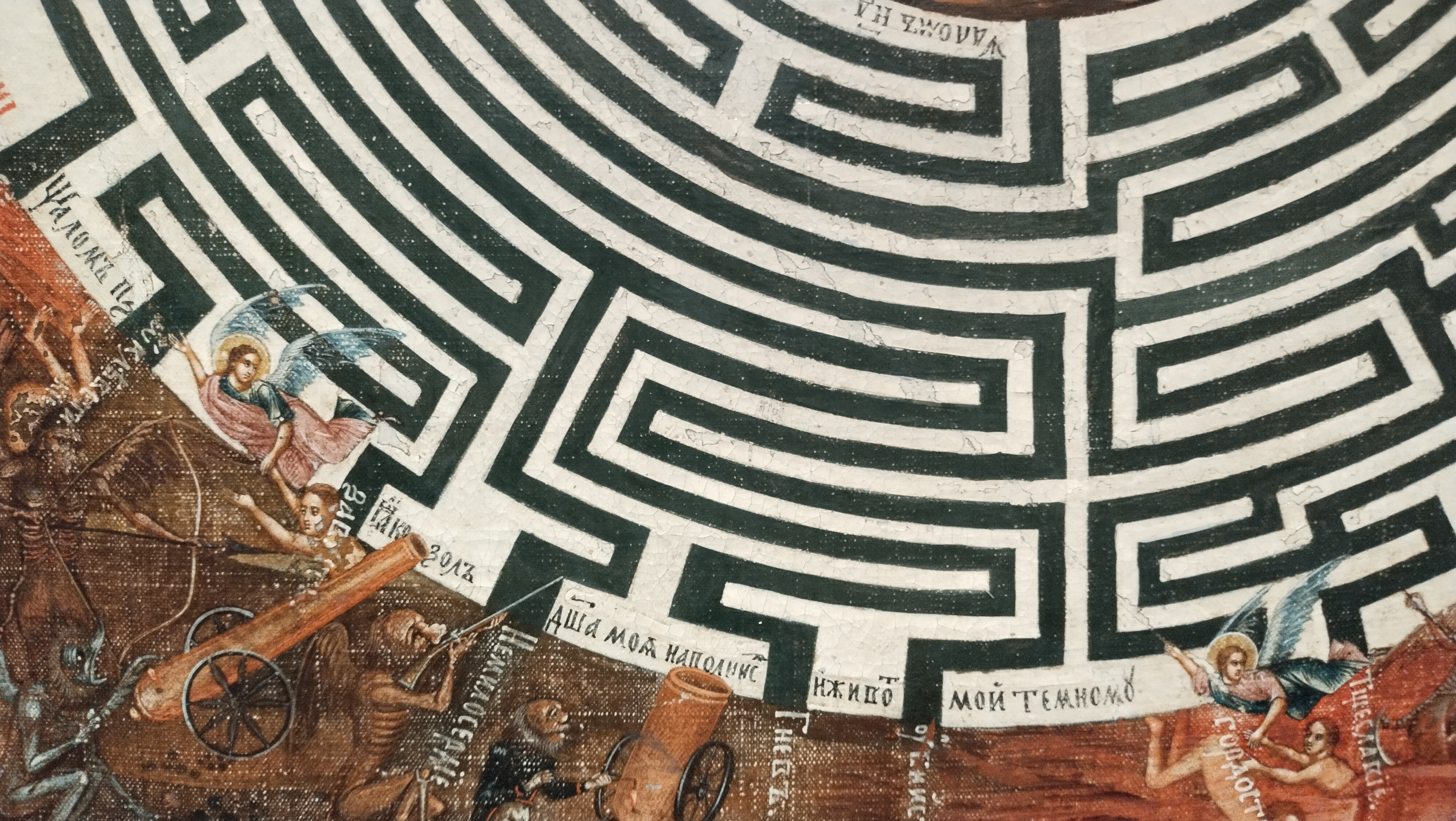
Lower left part. Demons with weapons

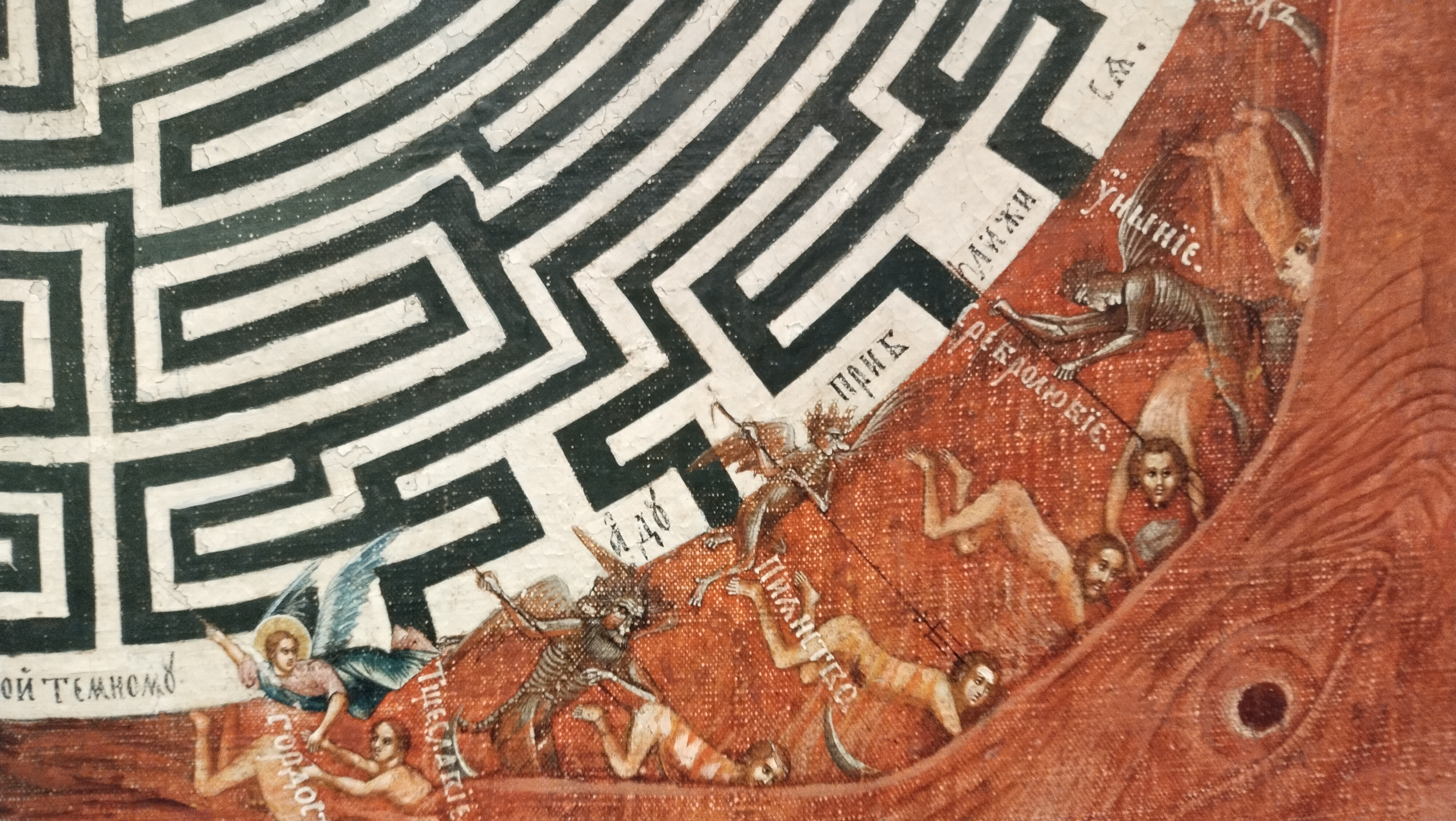
Lower right part. Fiery Gehenna

=== Icon from the State Museum of the History of Religion ===
The composition of the icon employs the techniques of reverse perspective. The action unfolds in a single plane. The depicted content is treated in a conventional and flat manner; only the person in the labyrinth in the middle register and Christ on the throne in the upper register are rendered with greater volume. Anastasia Dolgova notes the icon painter's use of techniques from book illustration and engraving. In her opinion, the depiction of the labyrinth is especially close to engraving. The text on the "Spiritual Labyrinth" icon demands concentration and attentive reading, which is also characteristic of engraving and is poorly suited to an icon, in which inscribed texts "traditionally play a subsidiary, auxiliary role or carry sacred meaning, merely supplementing the image and being reproduced in abbreviated form with titlos".

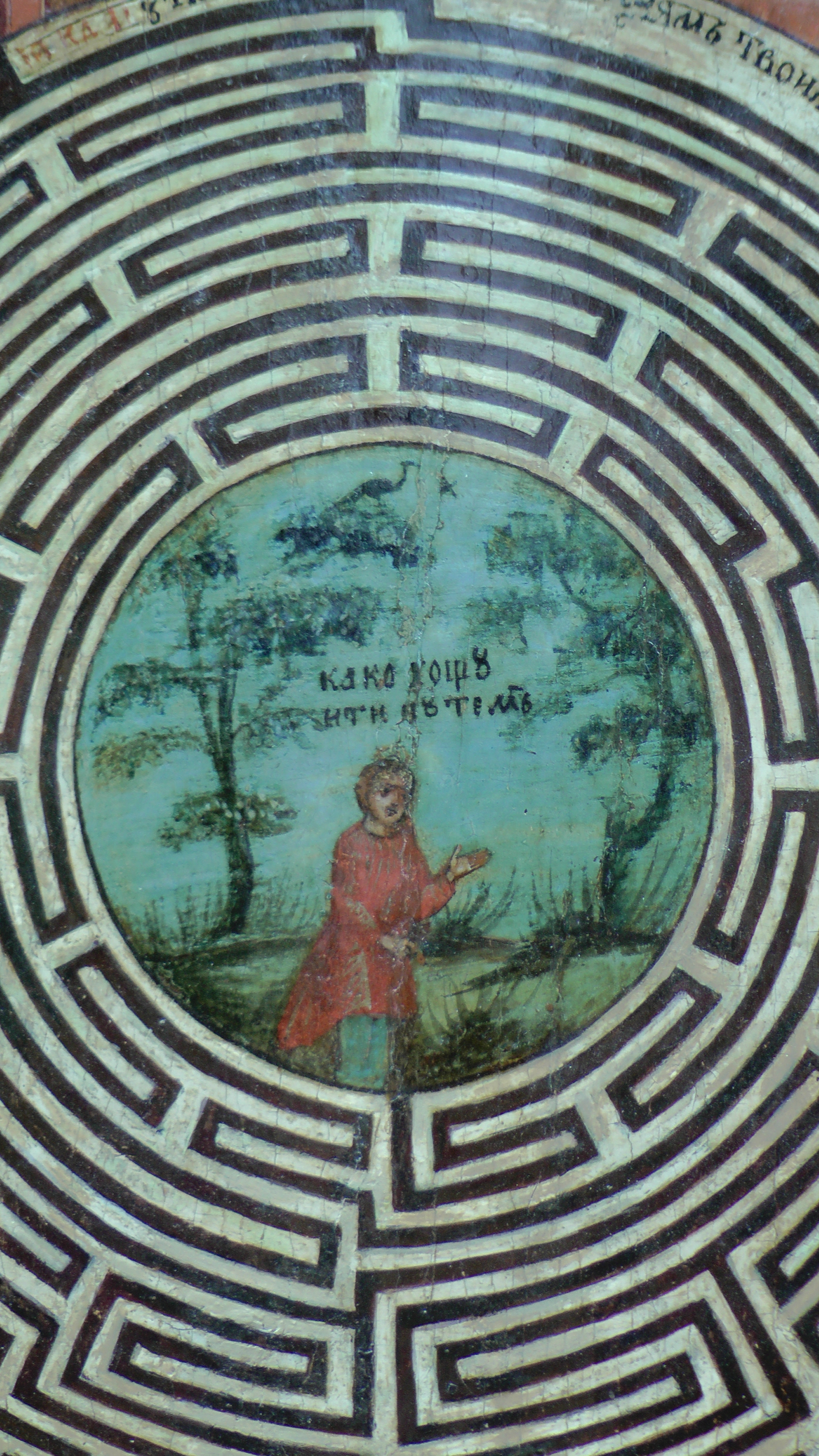
Central part of the labyrinth. A man kneeling

Dolgova analyzed the semantic and compositional structure of the icon. The icon is divided along the vertical central axis into two parts opposite in meaning (the death of a young sinner on one side of the axis and an elderly righteous person on the other). There is also an analogous, horizontal division(the fiery Gehenna below and the New Jerusalem above). The composition "is supplemented by text and emotionally reinforced by the color scheme".

Depictions on the subject of the apocryphal "Vision of the Apostle Paul" in the middle register at the edges of the icon

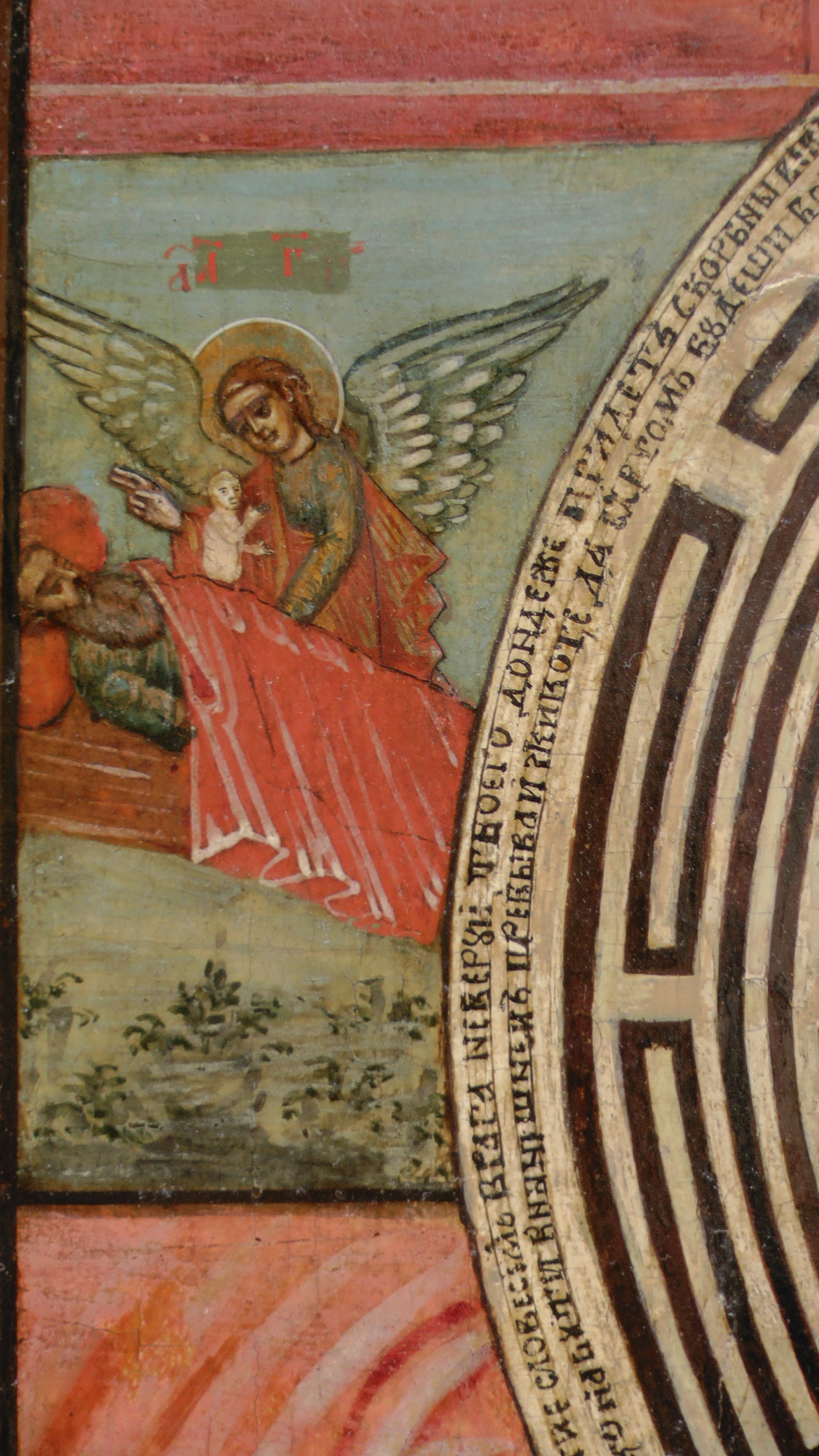
Death of the righteous man

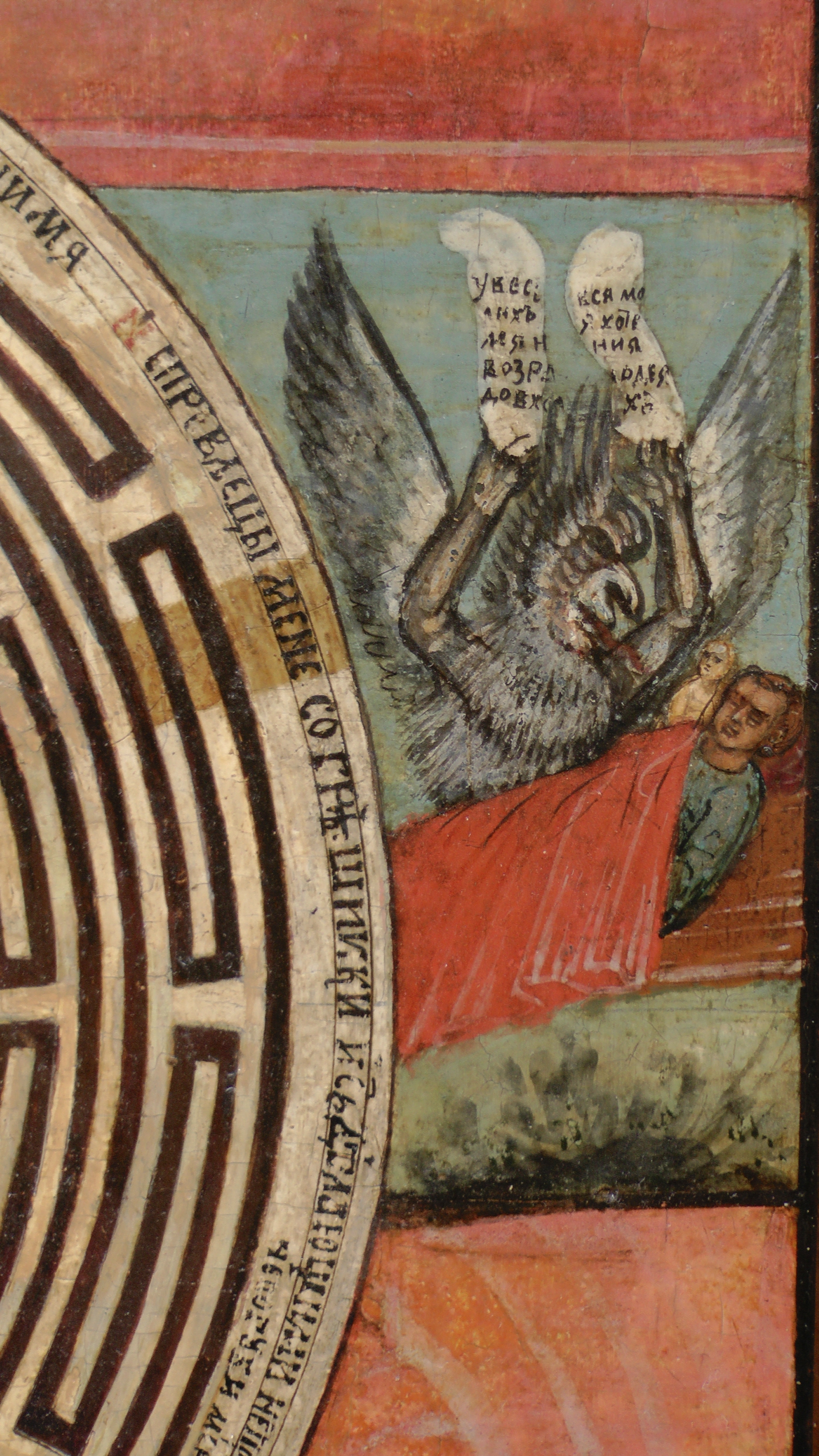
Death of the sinner

The "Spiritual Labyrinth" icon has three parts. The upper part depicts the New Jerusalem, the central part — the earthly world, the lower part — the underworld with the fiery Gehenna. At the center of the composition is the labyrinth, in the middle of which, against a relatively realistically rendered landscape background, is placed a person who, according to Dolgova, is kneeling. His red garments stand out against the dark green background of the scene. Above this figure, depicted at the center of the labyrinth, is the inscription: "How I wish to walk the path". The labyrinth is circular on an ochre-yellow background and has only one exit at the top. To the underworld, on the other hand, several paths lead, each corresponding to twelve sins: envy, slander, murder, fornication, drunkenness, pride, vainglory, despondency, wrath, avarice, gluttony, and overeating. Dolgova notes that to the seven deadly sins (pride, envy, gluttony, lust, wrath, greed, and despondency) the icon painter, guiding a Christian onto the true path, adds additional ones. This allows one to penetrate into the spiritual world of a person of that era.

Around the edges of the labyrinth is a text which Dolgova was only partially able to decipher. From three sides runs the inscription: "Brethren, do not believe the words of your enemy, until the sorrowful [illegible] course of this life has arrived. As if [illegible] dwelling in life, be with Christ forever [illegible]. Show me Thy ways, O Lord, and teach me Thy paths. Draw me not away with sinners and with those who work iniquity destroy me not". The line along the lower edge of the labyrinth is entirely indecipherable. Dolgova was only able to identify the source for two lines: 1) "Show me your ways, Lord, teach me your paths" (Ps 25:4); "Do not drag me away with the wicked, with those who do evil, who speak cordially with their neighbors but harbor malice in their hearts" (Ps 28:3). The catalogue of the London exhibition of 1992 erroneously stated that the text was taken from Psalm 88, and the catalogue of an exhibition in Finland in 1995 stated it was from Psalm 38.

On both sides of the labyrinth are two death scenes — that of a righteous man and that of a sinner. The righteous man — a venerable man on the left with a full beard in dark green garments under a red blanket. His soul, depicted as the figure of an infant, is received by an angel also in red garments. The sinner's soul (also in the form of an infant, while the sinner himself has the appearance of a beardless man) is received by a feathered monster with clawed paws, in which it holds two scrolls (Dolgova acknowledged that she was unable to decipher the text written in them).

A small arch in the Renaissance style opens the entrance to the New Jerusalem. Jesus Christ, in a red chiton and dark green himation, sits on a throne in the Baroque style. His vestments stand out clearly against the "reddish-ochre, warm and light-filled" overall color scheme of the upper register of the icon. From him radiate beams of light. The soul of the righteous man in white garments kneels beside an angel in red vestments. Dolgova assessed the buildings of the New City depicted by the icon painter as "buildings of different types, executed in the spirit of Western Renaissance architecture". Here and there between them are dark green trees, which also stand out by their color against the relatively even overall background.

The lower register of the icon is also executed in a reddish-ochre palette, "but this is no longer the color of warmth and light which fills the New Jerusalem, but the color of fire condemning sinners to eternal torment". The fiery Gehenna is represented on the icon as a monster with red eyes and an enormous mouth. In its mouth blaze yellow tongues of flame, signifying the underworld.

Fragments of the "Spiritual Labyrinth" from the State Museum of the History of Religion
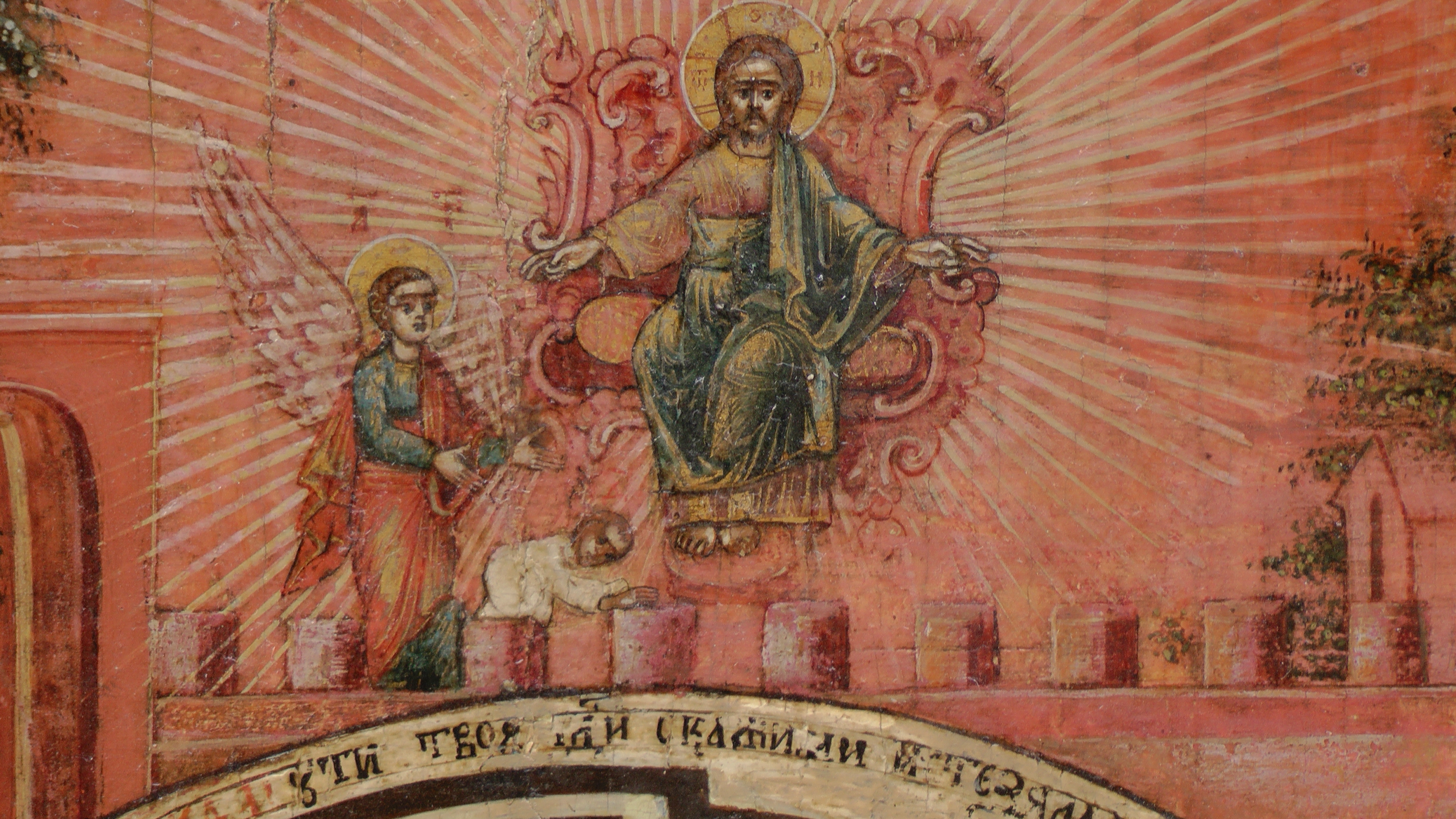
Center of the upper part. The soul of the righteous man before Christ

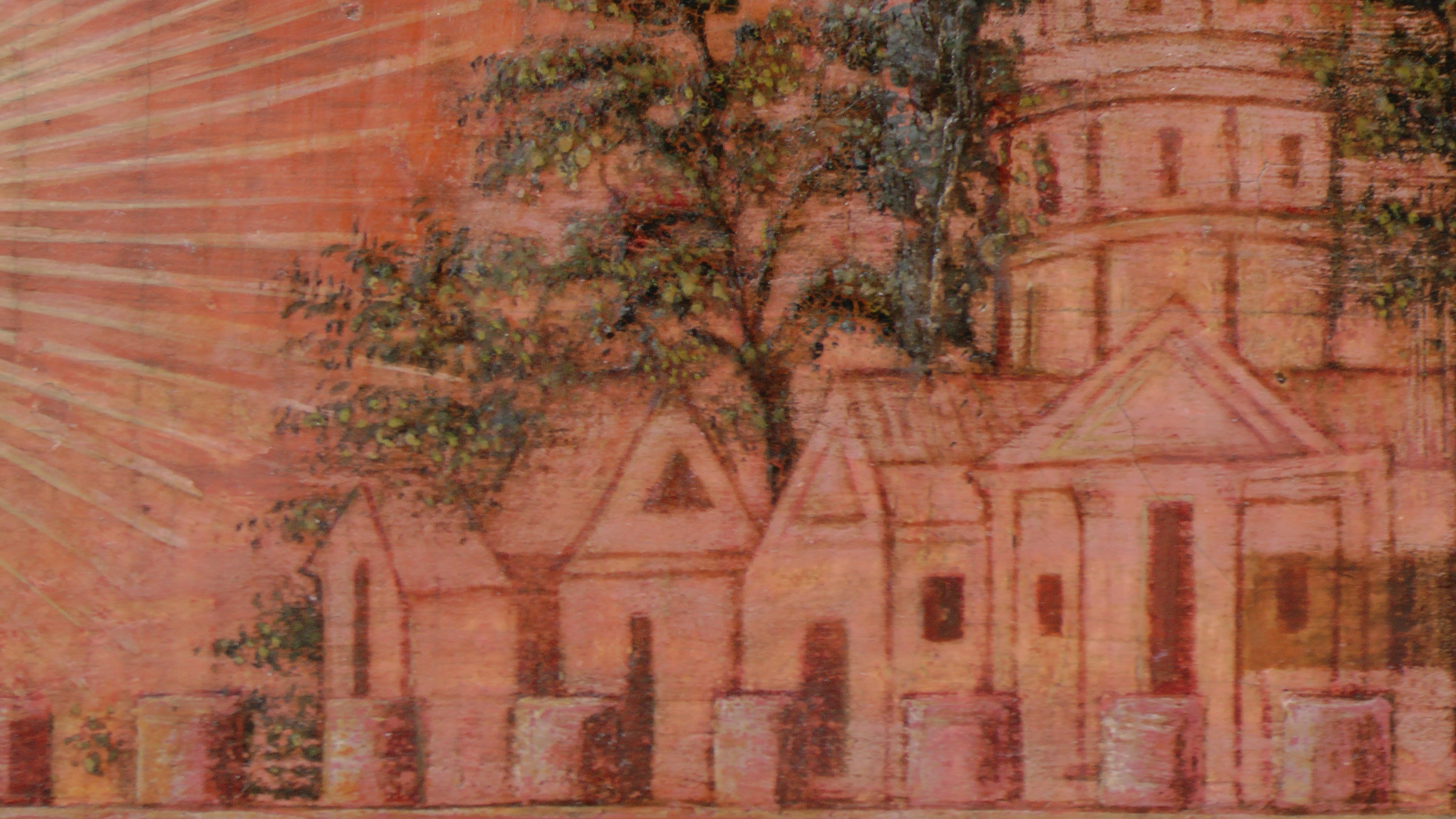
Upper right part. Fragment of the New Jerusalem

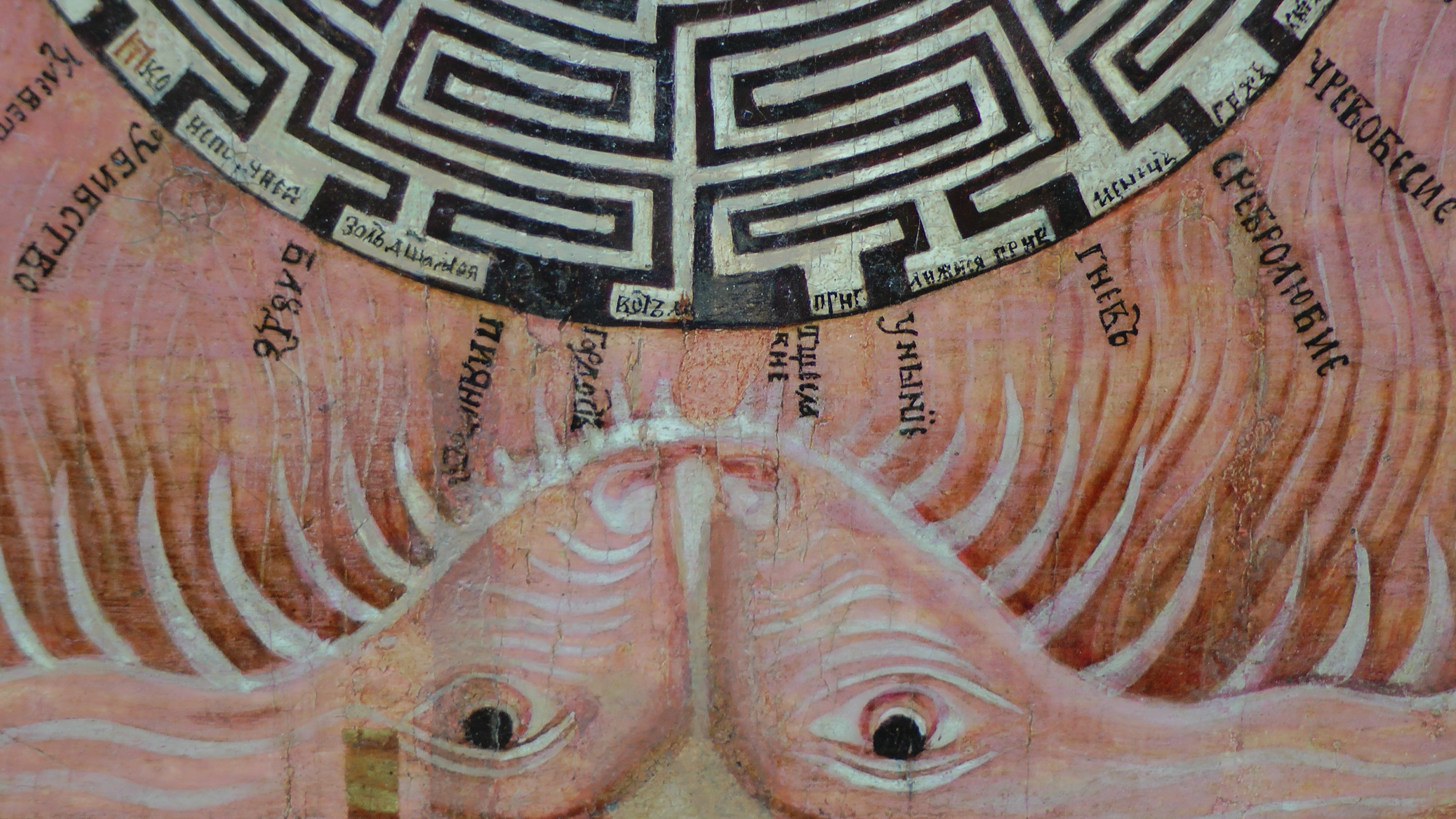
Lower part. Fiery Gehenna

== Icons in the collections of Russian museums ==
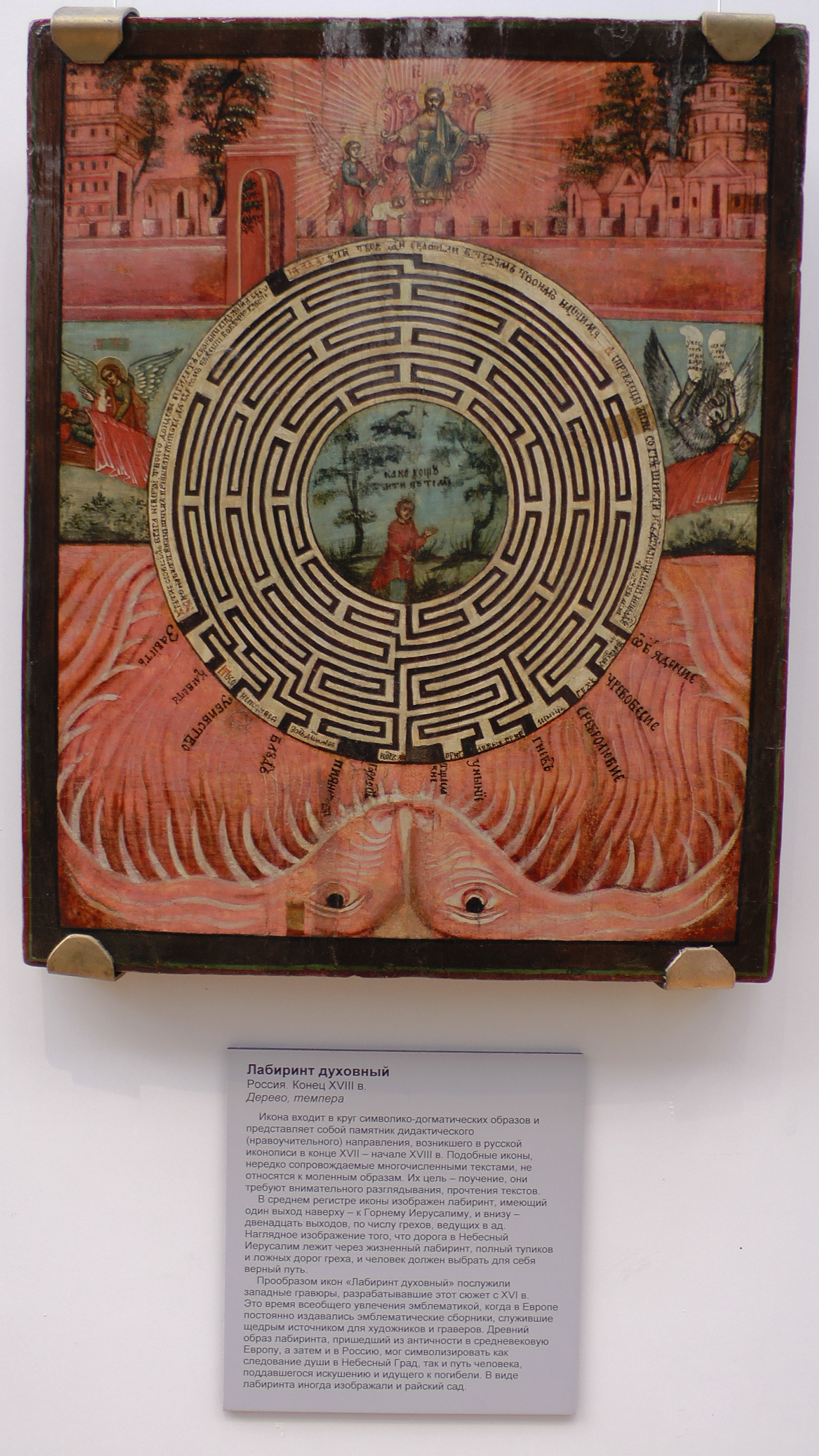
The "Spiritual Labyrinth" at a temporary exhibition in the Museum of the History of Religion, 2021

As of 2023, only two icons on the subject of the "spiritual labyrinth" were within the purview of art historians (however, art historian Galina Zelenskaya asserts: "the profound spiritual and didactic content, expressed in vivid imagery, contributed to the appearance of various recensions of the 'Labyrinth' in icon painting and in the Russian popular print — the lubok"). One of them is part of the collection of the Museum of the History of Religion in Saint Petersburg. The second is in the collection of the New Jerusalem museum in Istra in Moscow Oblast.

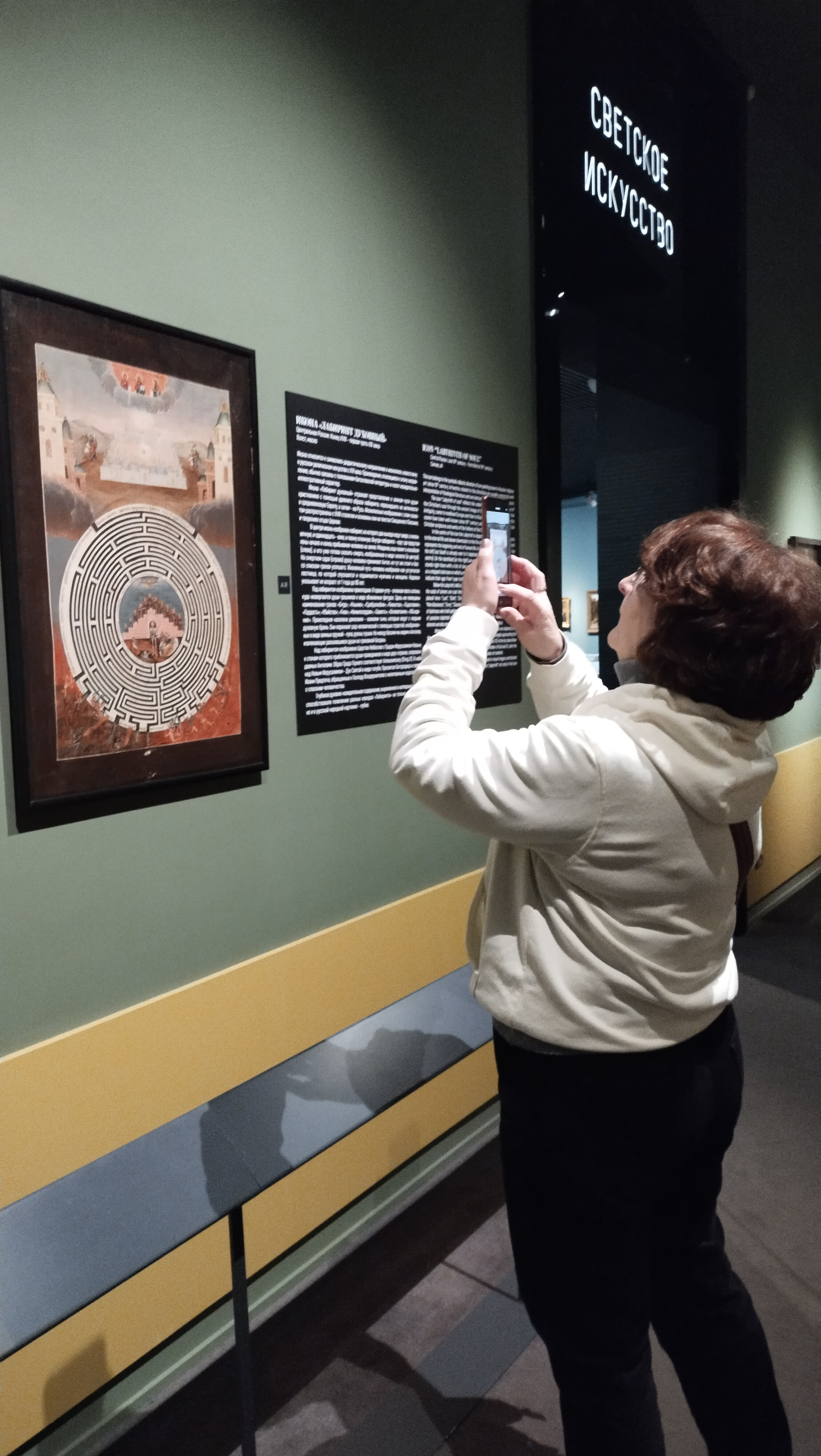
The "Spiritual Labyrinth" in the permanent exhibition of the New Jerusalem Museum, April 2023

Dolgova asserts that the first of the two icons was painted by a master of the Moscow school of icon painting in the late 18th century, and attributes its execution to the traditional icon-painting technique (tempera on wood). The dimensions of this icon are 54 by 43.9 by 3.1 centimetres (21.3 in × 17.3 in × 1.2 in) (the website of St. Tikhon's Orthodox University provides slightly different information: 54 by 44 centimetres (21 in × 17 in), tempera on wood, second half of the 18th century). Dolgova notes that the provenance of this icon and its location before entering the museum collection are unknown. The icon from the collection of the State Museum of the History of Religion has been exhibited many times and is well known to specialists. At the same time, Dolgova asserts that as of 2011, the iconography of this icon has been poorly studied, and in the museum catalogues its description is "given schematically, in some cases even with an erroneous reference to the texts of a written source".

Among the exhibitions at which the icon has appeared are the exhibitions Treasures of Sacred Art of the State Museum of the History of Religion of Saint Petersburg in London, held in April–June 1992, The Concept of Paradise in Religious Images at the Museum of Fine Arts in Joensuu in 1995, and Through the Labyrinth of Human Vices, held from February 18 to April 14, 2021, at the Museum of the History of Religion, where it occupied the central place.

The second icon is dated by Anastasia Dolgova to the turn of the 17th and 18th centuries; she considers it to have come from the Cathedral of the Resurrection of the New Jerusalem Monastery. The album–catalogue of the New Jerusalem Museum provides different information (the author being senior research fellow of the art department of the New Jerusalem Museum, Natalya Merzlyutina). According to it, the icon originates from Central Russia, but the direct source of the icon's entry into the museum collection is unknown, and its creation dates to the late 18th century or first third of the 19th. Art historian Igor Orlov simply dated it to the 18th century. The album–catalogue specifies the icon's execution technique — oil painting on canvas — and its dimensions — 80 by 57 centimetres (31 in × 22 in). (Orlov indicated the inverse dimensions — 57 by 80 centimetres [22 in × 31 in].) The inventory number of the icon in the museum's collection is Zh-181.

== Origin of "spiritual labyrinth" iconography ==
=== The "symbolicо-dogmatic" trend in icon painting ===
Anastasia Dolgova attributed the iconography of the "spiritual labyrinth" to the "symbolico-dogmatic" trend (Natalya Merzlyutina held the same view). From her perspective, from the mid-16th century onward — Dolgova places the emergence of didactic iconography later: the late 17th and early 18th centuries — the icon begins to illustrate "the texts of prayers, hymnody, and services, striving to depict and explain complex theological concepts in an accessible manner". Such an icon often constitutes an illustration of a theological dogma, yet it is not perceived by believers as a mediator in communication with God. Icons belonging to the "symbolico-dogmatic" trend introduce into iconography a new circle of subjects, often based on the interpretation of theological and "other kinds of literature", and are simultaneously didactic and illustrative in character. A stable iconography of such subjects gradually takes shape. The artistic language of symbolico-dogmatic icons is distinctive in comparison with traditional icon painting: they are characterized, for example, by the presence of a large number of explanatory texts.

Dolgova noted the poor study of such iconographic monuments. Their iconography, origin, and place in the church had not by 2011 become the subject of detailed study. She connected this with the absence of standardized terminology that could be applied by specialists in analyzing this body of monuments. She asserts that the study of symbolico-dogmatic icons is at an initial stage: "the body of monuments is being defined, their iconographic study is being conducted, and their characteristics are being assessed".

=== Literary source ===
Anastasia Dolgova notes the indisputable influence of the Bible on the development of the "spiritual labyrinth" iconography and calls it the primary source. Alongside it, she points to the text of the apocryphal "Vision of the Apostle Paul": "one of the most ancient recensions (in a Christian context) of the legend of a journey into the afterlife, into paradise and into hell". She considers that it was from this text that the icon painter drew the subjects for depicting in the middle register of the icon the deaths of the sinner and the righteous man:

…then he saw a man at the point of death. This was a righteous man, a poor man, who in dying found rest. Before him appeared all the deeds he had performed in God's name, and "his entire life". His soul was received gently by a benevolent angel… When a sinner, who has spent his entire life in eating and drinking, feels death approaching and all his spiritual deeds surround him, he begins to lament bitterly and cries out that it would have been better for him never to have been born in this world. Stern angels forcibly tear his soul from his body… The guardian angel, in turn, reproaches the soul.

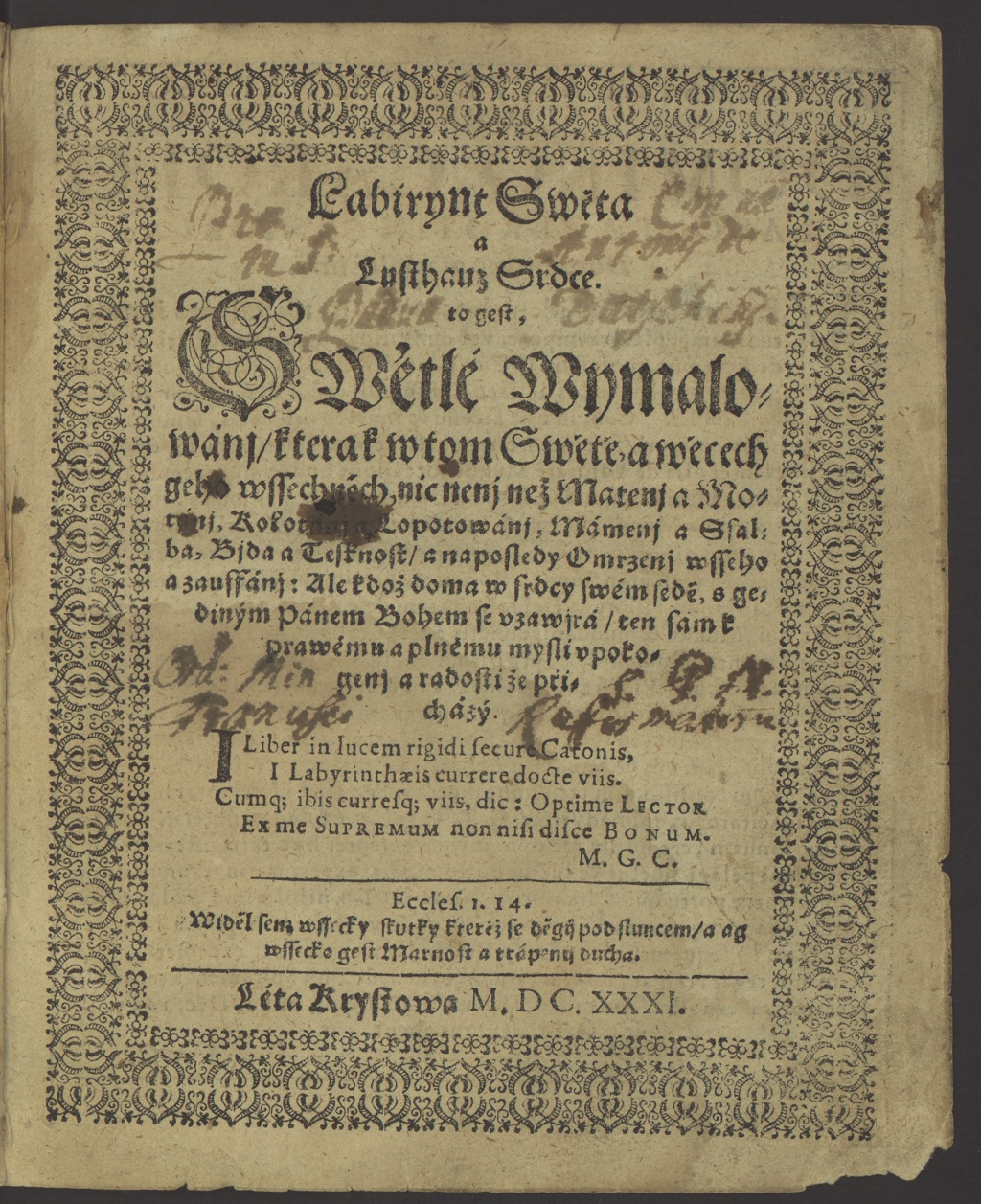
The Labyrinth of the World and the Paradise of the Heart by Jan Amos Comenius, edition of 1631

Dolgova notes that the scene of the death of the righteous man is depicted close to the text of the "Vision of the Apostle Paul", while the death of the sinner is rendered "somewhat differently", as "the opposite of the death of the righteous man, almost mirroring its general composition".

As Sergei Zotov notes, the image of the labyrinth denoting the danger-filled path of a person to God began to appear in Russian spiritual literature from the 15th century, and this subject ultimately also made its way "onto church images" (among which Zotov included the "spiritual labyrinth" iconography). Zotov considers that the basis for the "spiritual labyrinth" iconography could have been the book by the Czech philosopher, pedagogue, and theologian John Amos Comenius Labyrinth of the World and Paradise of the Heart. It was translated into Russian in the first half of the 17th century. In the book, a traveler wanders "through the labyrinth of the world, surveying the arrangement of estates, sciences, and religion". The outcome of his wanderings is a coming to Christ and spiritual enlightenment. The carefree death of the righteous man is mentioned and his ascent to paradise is described.

Tracing the Western European source of Russian iconography, Zotov names allegorical poetic works and their illustrations that appeared in the 15th century. Among such literary monuments is the German spiritual poem The True Guide of the King. Zotov allows that the illustration to this book or another similar one could have inspired the Russian icon painter as well. He also drew attention to the use of the labyrinth image by Western mysticism of late antiquity. For example, the 4th-century Christian poet Prudentius writes of the labyrinth as a symbol of the recklessness of pagans and heretics and creates metaphors of wandering through the world and seeking the true path. The allegory of the labyrinth in this sense, in Zotov's view, survived until the 10th century, when the French Benedictine monk and later saint Abbo of Fleury complained that heretics were confusing young people by casting them "into the labyrinth of error". This same line was continued by Dante, who described hell "as a tangled labyrinth consisting of many circles, ledges, and crevices, in contrast to the clear concentric rings of paradise".

=== Western European and Russian engravings, and Catholic frescoes ===
Anastasia Dolgova considers that images similar in meaning to "spiritual labyrinth" iconography can be found in Western European engravings of the 17th century, which, she points out, in the 17th and 18th centuries exerted great influence on Russian icon painting. She specifically notes the influence of "Western European pattern books (Note: A "pattern book" is a conventional name for a collection of preparatory works by a European medieval artist. It consists of sheets stitched into a book. The purpose of such collections is debated.) and medieval engravings with an emblematic way of thinking".

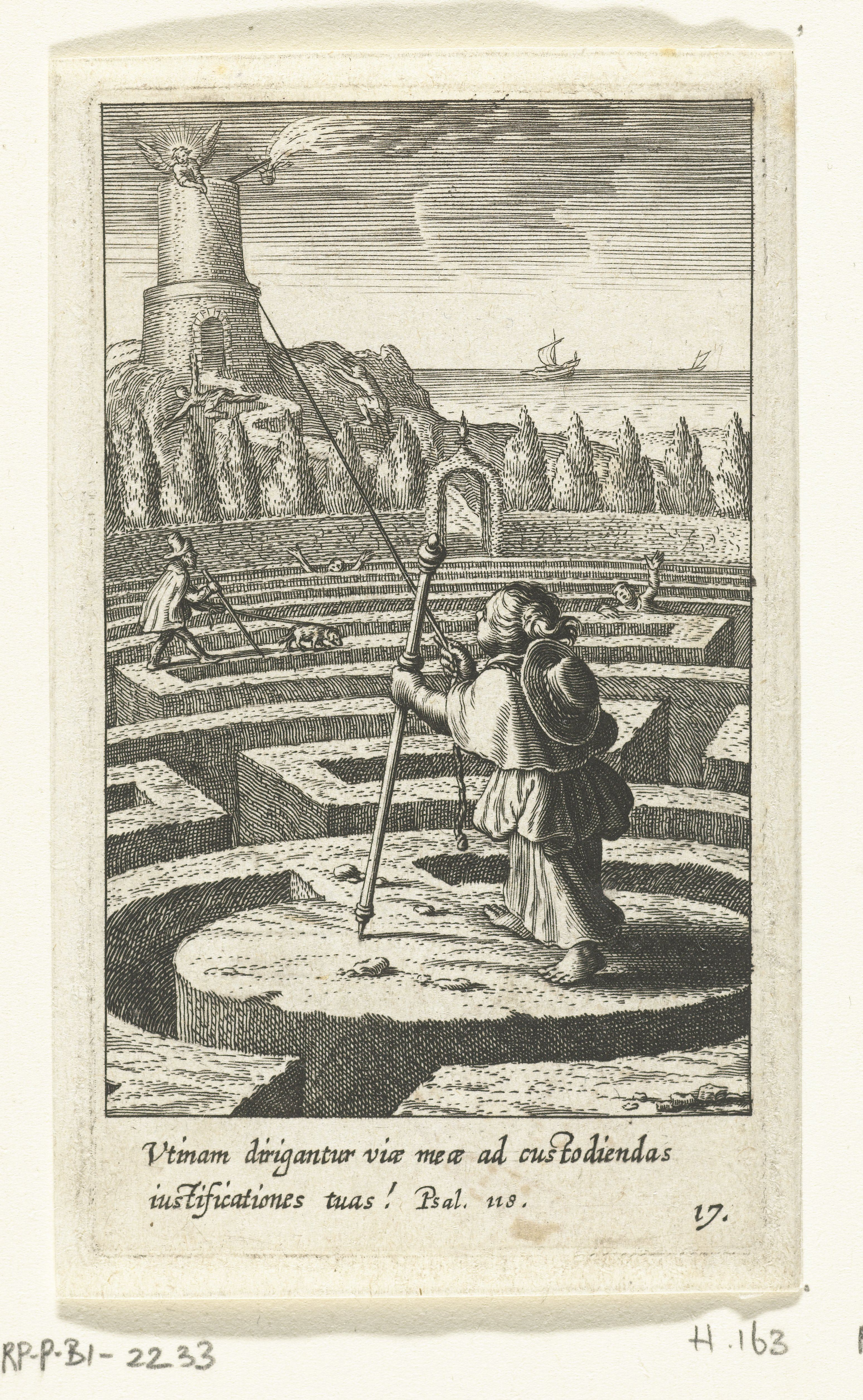
Boetius Adams Bolswert. Child dressed as a pilgrim in a labyrinth, 1624

Among European engravings there exist examples of the labyrinth as a symbol of spiritual seeking — one such example is an engraving which Dolgova calls "The Soul of a Pilgrim, Led by the Word of God, in the Labyrinth of Spiritual Searching", attributes to Herman Hugo, and dates to 1622. She notes, however, that the labyrinth in it is depicted "from a different viewpoint and in a different vein". In the engraving, a person is depicted from behind, standing at the center of a circular labyrinth. Inside the labyrinth, several other people are also depicted, one of whom "has stumbled and is reaching his hand upward, asking for help". According to Dolgova, "the didactic meaning of the engraving is analogous to the meaning of the icons". From her point of view, "the differences can be easily explained by the difference between the artistic languages of icon painting and engraving". In fact, Herman Hugo was the author of the text of the book Pia desideria (Antwerp, 1624), which was illustrated with an engraving by Boetius Adams Bolswert titled "Child dressed as a pilgrim in a labyrinth", Rijksmuseum, Amsterdam, 95 by 56 millimetres (3.7 in × 2.2 in).

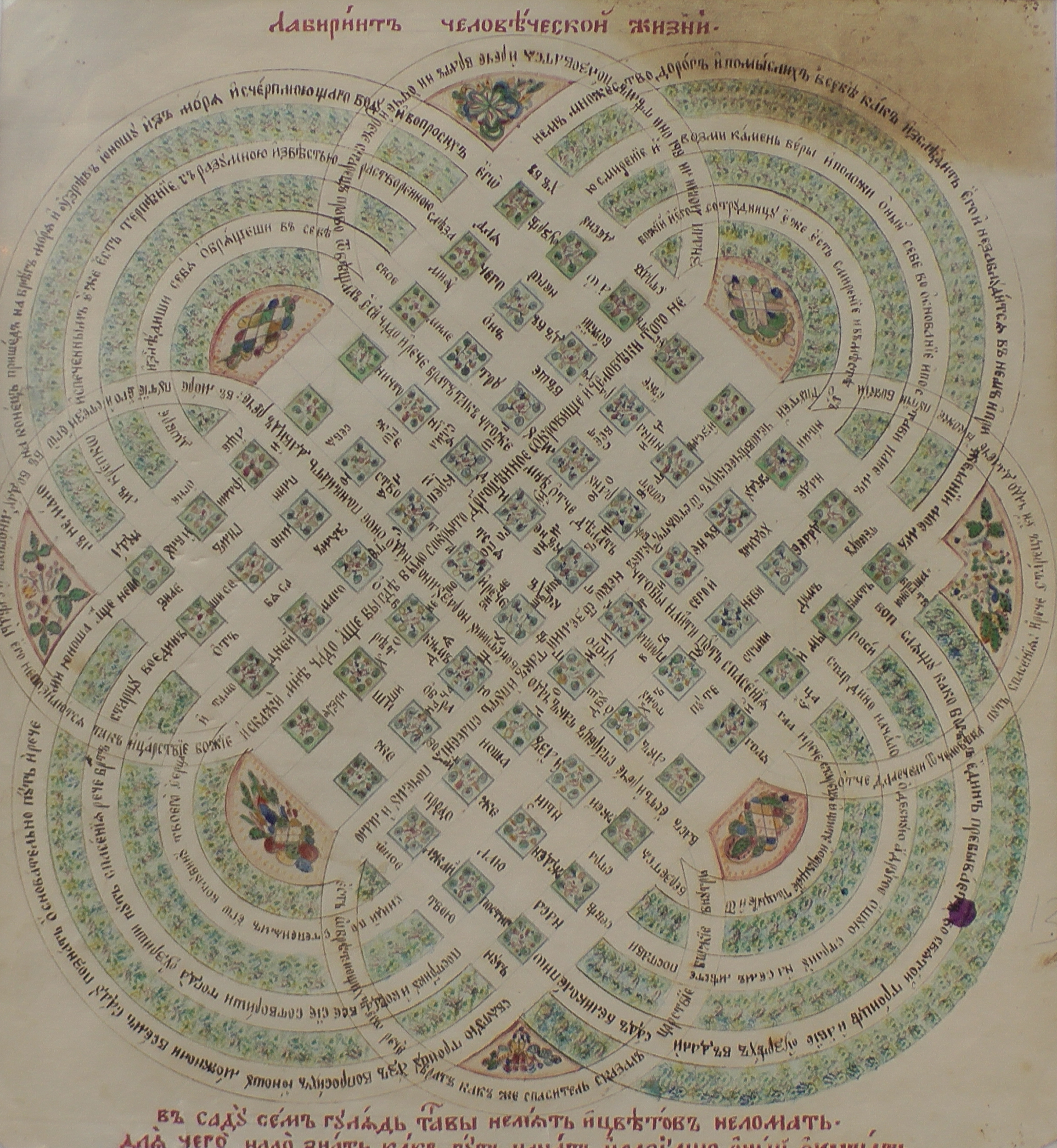
"The Labyrinth of Human Life" from the Museum of the History of Religion, 1860s

Dolgova identified several more engravings that could be related to "spiritual labyrinth" iconography:

First, in the third volume of the multi-volume work by Dmitry Rovinsky Russian Popular Prints there is a description of an engraving titled "Spiritual Labyrinth", then in the collection of the Olsufyevs. Dolgova cited the description by Rovinsky:

The labyrinth is arranged in a large… octagon; the paths run in circles, concentrically, in straight bands in 22 rows: in the center is the New Jerusalem (paradise), in it the Holy Spirit, in the form of a dove… In the four corners are depicted, at the top: (1) the arrival of the Wise Thief in paradise, (2) Abraham, Isaac, and Jacob in paradise, and at the bottom: (3) the death of a sinner and (4) sinners in hellfire. Along the paths the following inscriptions appear: in the upper half of the labyrinth 'The narrow way leading into eternal life. Disperse your wealth and endow the homes of the poor and the orphans. Renounce sweet foods, take up dry eating. Cease drunkenness and love sobriety.' At the bottom the text reads: 'the broad and wide way, leading to eternal destruction…Hate sloth, take up obedience, if anyone strikes you on the cheek, turn it to the other also…' Text on the left: 'Love virginity, hate fornication. Renounce impurity, take up chastity, cease evil, repent.' On the right: 'Cease malice, love your enemies in friendship, renounce cunning, accept adversity and tribulation. Renounce worldly vanities, approach salvation'.

In this description, Dolgova (who had not seen the engraving itself) found "an instructive meaning, expressed in an interpretation close to the icons under consideration", and concluded that one can speak "of a certain similarity of iconography" as well, since the popular engraving displays scenes of a sinner's death, a depiction of the labyrinth, hell, and the New Jerusalem. All of these are also part of the "spiritual labyrinth" iconography.

Secondly, an engraving from the Iconologia of the Italian writer and iconographer Cesare Ripa contains an allegorical depiction of the world in the form of a labyrinth. At the end of the labyrinth is a skeleton, which Dolgova interprets as a symbol of death. In her view, such a depiction makes it possible to compare the labyrinth in this engraving with "spiritual labyrinth" iconography. In both cases, the labyrinth is "a symbol of the world, of life, of life's journey".

Anastasia Dolgova specifically notes that, since the architecture in the "spiritual labyrinth" icon from the Museum of the History of Religion contains features of Western European building, this can be perceived as indirect confirmation of the connection between the "spiritual labyrinth" iconography and engravings of Western origin. Summing up, Dolgova writes that the "spiritual labyrinth" iconography was the result of the combined influence of literary sources and Western European engravings. Individual details of the iconography were directly borrowed from engravings and spiritual literature.

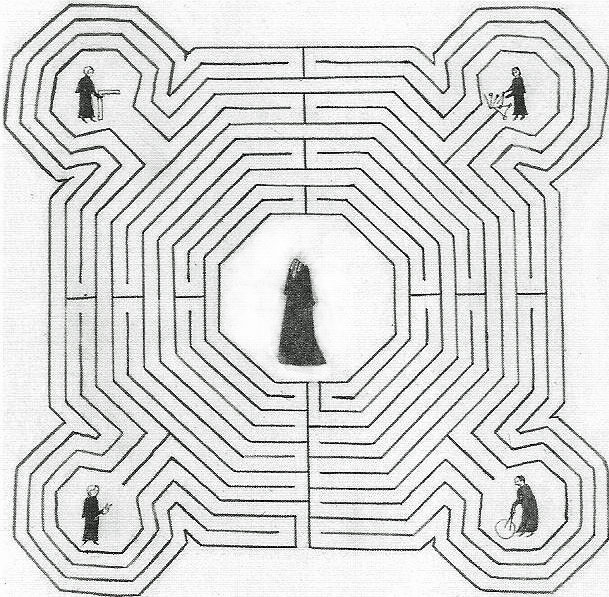
Labyrinth of the Reims Cathedral with figures of architects. Drawing by Jacques Cellier (16th century)

Sergei Zotov considers a possible source of the iconography to be allegorical depictions in church frescoes of Western Europe, in which the hand of the Virgin Mary or Jesus Christ himself guides wayfarers wandering in the labyrinth of their passions, providing the wanderers with a guiding thread akin to the thread of Ariadne from the myth of Theseus and the Minotaur. Citing the labyrinths on the floors of Gothic cathedrals, Zotov notes that the labyrinth in medieval Europe also served as a symbol of spiritual seeking. In Chartres Cathedral, even at the beginning of the 21st century, believers perform a special mystical pilgrimage on their knees from the beginning to the center along such a labyrinth on Fridays (the day of Christ's death). In Feodorovskaya Icon Cathedral in Saint Petersburg there is a reduced copy of the Chartres labyrinth. The clergy of the cathedral offer the following explanation: "…moving along the white line, one must reach the center… you fairly quickly find yourself in close proximity to the center, but do not reach it. Moving further, you go further and further from the center, until you find yourself at the farthest radius. And here, in a situation of maximum distance, it suddenly turns out that it only takes a few more turns and you are at the center. The meaning is simple — beginning the search for God, a person quite quickly falls into the illusion that the goal has already been reached. Yet ahead lies a long, winding path. And when, it seems, all hope has been lost and God is very far away, it turns out that He is near".

Galina Zelenskaya notes the labyrinths on the floors of the Gothic cathedrals of Chartres, Amiens, and Reims, and Russian familiarity with the book of Jan Amos Comenius; however, she writes that iconographic images with this subject spread in Russia only from the 18th century onward and are based on texts of Holy Scripture and the works of the Church Fathers.

=== Resettlement to Russia of religious sectarians from Europe ===
Igor Orlov allows that the symbolism of the labyrinth penetrated into Russia thanks to European masters invited by Peter I and his successors in the late 17th and early 18th centuries. The labyrinth is not found in earlier Russian iconography. Orlov linked its appearance with the resettlement to Russia of members of the religious community known as the Bohemian Brethren. After what Orlov describes as expulsion from Bohemia in the late 17th century, they settled in Saxony at the estate of Count Nikolaus Ludwig von Zinzendorf Herrnhut, and from that time became known as Herrnhuters. In 1729, the Herrnhuters appeared in Livonia (within the Russian Empire); and in 1764, having received the right of freedom of religion and of free residence, they resettled in the southern provinces of Russia (including in the Tsaritsyn district of Saratov Governorate). The decisive role in the spread of labyrinth symbolism in Russia could have been played, in Orlov's view, by the book Labyrinth of the World and Paradise of the Heart (1623), with a Russian verse preface written in the 1630s. Orlov emphasizes that its author, Jan Amos Comenius, was the last bishop of this sect. Russian icon painters, having borrowed the image of the labyrinth from the Herrnhuters, subsequently sought to find a correspondence for it in the texts of Holy Scripture and the works of the Holy Fathers.

== Figurative meaning of "spiritual labyrinth" iconography ==
Anastasia Dolgova considers that "the figurative interpretation of the icon is based on emotional impact":

The terrifying appearance of the flame and Gehenna, supplemented by a list of sins, expressively marked in black, is contrasted with the New vision behind the strong walls of the wondrous city, near the throne of the Savior himself, illuminating the New Jerusalem with rays of light — the path to which for mortal man passes through the labyrinth of life and is accompanied by prayers and righteous deeds that strengthen Christian virtues.

Dolgova noted the accessibility of "spiritual labyrinth" iconography to a viewer "of any level".

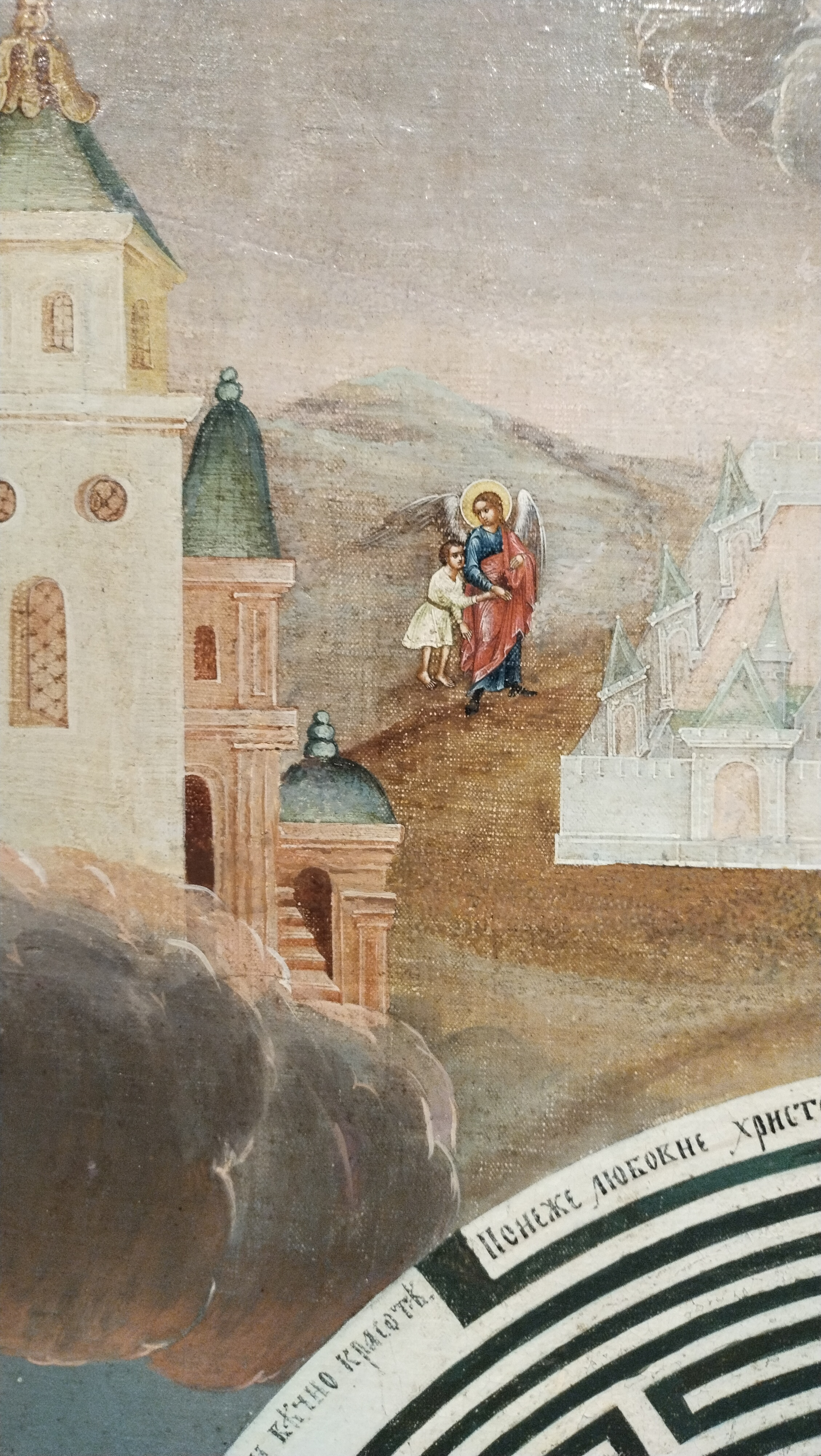
The "Spiritual Labyrinth" from Istra (upper left part). An angel and the soul of the righteous man walk to the New Jerusalem

Particular importance in creating the artistic image of the icon belongs, in Dolgova's opinion, to symbols and allegories. The most important of these is the labyrinth, which occupies the central part of the icon and is of significant scale (especially in comparison with the characters at its center). The texts positioned along its outer circle supplement the development of the subject. The meaning of "spiritual labyrinth" iconography is that "a person must choose the right path in the vast labyrinth of life, full of dead ends, difficulties, and false, sinful roads". It is precisely the labyrinth that first attracts the viewer's attention — the upper and lower registers of the image the viewer begins to examine only after this.

Dolgova notes that the icon from the New Jerusalem Museum is "lighter and more varied" than the image from the Museum of the History of Religion. While the upper register is executed in delicate, light colors, they "intensify and darken towards the bottom". For example, the lower left corner is the darkest on the icon. The icon from Istra also contains rhyming lines, including verses from the Psalms. Dolgova notes that both icons contain the same lines from Psalm 25: "Show me your ways, Lord, teach me your path" (Ps 25:4). She considers these to be the key to understanding "spiritual labyrinth" iconography. Comparing the two icons, she draws two conclusions:

- concerning the thematic closeness of both "Spiritual Labyrinths" within a single time period and the system of "unified pictorial and sign-based principles" that were characteristic of icons of the didactic trend in the 18th century;
- "Concerning the iconographic difference, caused probably by the absence of an established iconography of this subject on Russian soil, and apparently by a certain difference in the sources that served as the basis for creating the icons."

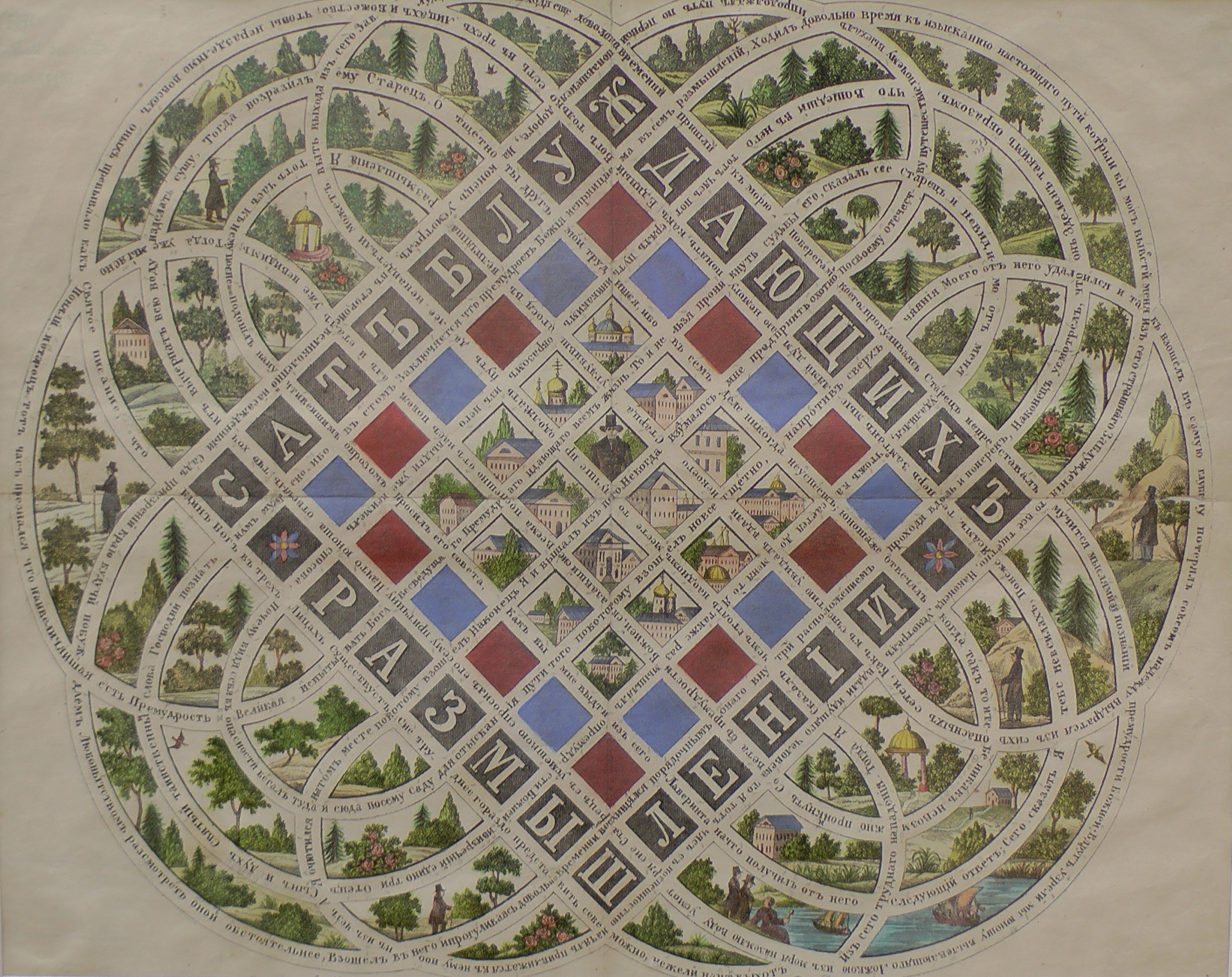
The Garden of Wandering Reflections, 1859. Lithograph by Pyotr Lukyanov

Sergei Zotov suggests that the "spiritual labyrinth" was used for divination or for testing personal piety. The viewer would set off on a journey through the labyrinth, and upon reaching the end would determine which sin they needed to combat first. In Zotov's view, thanks to such an icon parishioners "received a forecast for the future and tested the purity of their soul". Zotov also advanced a second hypothesis — for the clergy and intellectuals, such an icon was "a mystical exercise, allowing one to reflect on the transience of human existence and the correctness of one's decisions, a kind of confession".

Igor Orlov asserts that various recensions or copies of the "Spiritual Labyrinth" were reproduced not only in icon painting but also in popular, and above all in Old Believer, lubok. He considers that the "mythologeme" of the labyrinth is realized in various forms in different cultures sharing common racial and religious roots. Despite the various interpretations of the labyrinth symbol in the culture of different eras, its semantics is connected with the search for "paths of spiritual and physical salvation", for an exit into the sacred vertical from the "tangled" situation of the horizontal (worldly) scheme of life.

Contemporary historians of medieval culture Dmitry Antonov and Mikhail Mayzuls touch on the problem of the figurative meaning of "spiritual labyrinth" iconography in the book Demons and Sinners in Old Russian Iconography: Semiotics of the Image. They note the novelty of the iconographic type of death depicted there — a skeleton with a scythe. They connect it with didactic compositions on the theme of memento mori, which appeared in great numbers in the Russian Empire in the 18th century.

== Bibliography ==
=== Sources ===
- "The Vision of the Holy Apostle Paul. Translated by V. M. Khachaturyan. Commentary and notes by V. M. Khachaturyan and V. V. Milkov". Apokrify Drevney Rusi: Teksty i issledovaniya / Apocrypha of Ancient Rus': Texts and Studies. Ed. V. V. Milkov. Obshchestvennaya mysl': issledovaniya i publikatsii / Social Thought: Research and Publications. Moscow: Nauka. 1997. ISBN 5-02-013629-8.

=== Researches and non-fiction ===
- Antonov, D. I.; Mayzuls, M. R. (2011). Демоны и грешники в древнерусской иконографии: семиотика образа [Demons and Sinners in Old Russian Iconography: Semiotics of the Image] (in Russian). Moscow: Indrik. pp. 222–225. ISBN 978-5-9167-4149-0.
- Dolgova, A. I. (2011). "Об истоках и символике иконографии «Лабиринт духовный» // Актуальные проблемы теории и истории искусства : Сборник научных статей" [On the Origins and Symbolism of the Iconography of the 'Spiritual Labyrinth' // Current Issues in Art Theory and History: A Collection of Scholarly Articles]. Aktual'nye problemy teorii i istorii iskusstva / Current Problems in the Theory and History of Art (Collection of scholarly articles) (in Russian). 1. Ed. S. V. Maltseva, E. Yu. Stanyukovich-Denisova. Saint Petersburg: Professiya: 156–166. ISBN 978-5-2880-5174-6.
- Zelenskaya, G. M. (2012-04-23). "Лабиринт духовный" [Spiritual Labyrinth]. Pravoslavnaya gazeta / Orthodox Newspaper (in Russian). No. 16 (673). Yekaterinburg: Yekaterinburg Diocesan Information and Publishing Center.
- Zotov, S. O. (2021). Иконный лабиринт // Иконографический беспредел: необычное в православной иконе [The Iconic Labyrinth // Iconographic Freedom: The Unusual in Orthodox Icons] (in Russian). Moscow: Eksmo. pp. 175–179. ISBN 978-5-0410-8621-3.
- Merzlyutina, N. A. (2019). Лабиринт Духовный // Сокровища музея «Новый Иерусалим» [The Spiritual Labyrinth // Treasures of the "New Jerusalem" Museum] (in Russian). Moscow: RPK «Paragraf». pp. 19, 247. ISBN 978-5-6041-2003-3.
- Orlov, I. I. (2016). "Образ лабиринта в иконографии одной русской иконы. Иконография через герменевтику" [The Image of the Labyrinth in the Iconography of a Russian Icon: Iconography through Hermeneutics]. Manuskript / Manuscript (in Russian) (11–2 (73)). Tambov: OOO Izdatelstvo «Gramota»: 143–148. ISSN 2618-9690.
- Rovinsky, D. A. (1881). 167. Лабиринт духовный // Русские народные картинки / Собрал и описал Д. Ровинский [167. The Spiritual Labyrinth // Russian Folk Illustrations / Compiled and annotated by D. Rovinsky]. Sbornik Otdeleniya russkogo yazyka i slovesnosti Akademii nauk, Vol. 25 / Collection of the Division of Russian Language and Literature of the Academy of Sciences, Vol. 25 (in Russian). Vol. 3. Pritchi i listy dukhovnye / Parables and Spiritual Broadsides. Saint Petersburg: Tipografiya Imperatorskoy akademii nauk / Typography of the Imperial Academy of Sciences. p. 144.
- Basova, M. B. (2006). 97. Лабиринт духовный // Русское искусство из собрания Государственного музея истории религии [97. The Spiritual Labyrinth // Russian Art from the Collection of the State Museum of the History of Religion] (in Russian). Moscow: Bely Gorod. p. 76. ISBN 5-7793-1063-7.
- Pennanen, U. (1995). Paratiisi uskonnollisissa kuvissa / The Concept of Paradise in Religious Images. Joensuun taidemuseon julkaisuja (in Finnish). Joensuu / Saint Petersburg: Joensuu Art Museum / The State Museum of History of Religion. p. 61. ISBN 9-5189-7112-9.
- Treasures of Sacred Art of the State Museum of the History of Religion of Saint-Petersburg: Catalogue of an Exhibition, London, 22 April – 30 June. Saint Petersburg: European Bank for Reconstruction and Development. 1992. p. 22.
