= Nazi morality =

Nazi morality is the moral system invented by and used by Nazism in Nazi Germany. Earlier scholarship denied the existence of Nazi morality, defining Nazism as existing outside of morality; individuals were portrayed as self-consciously evil or amoral. More recently, scholars have attempted to understand the moral thinking of Nazism. While some scholars have studied how the Nazi moral system was dispersed through propaganda and youth education, others emphasize how the Nazis repurposed existing moral frameworks. However, Nazism was particularistic and denigrated both universalistic Enlightenment values as well as Christian virtues such as empathy, pity, and mercy towards people not part of the racial collective.
