= Museum of the History of Religion =

Museum in Saint Petersburg, Russia

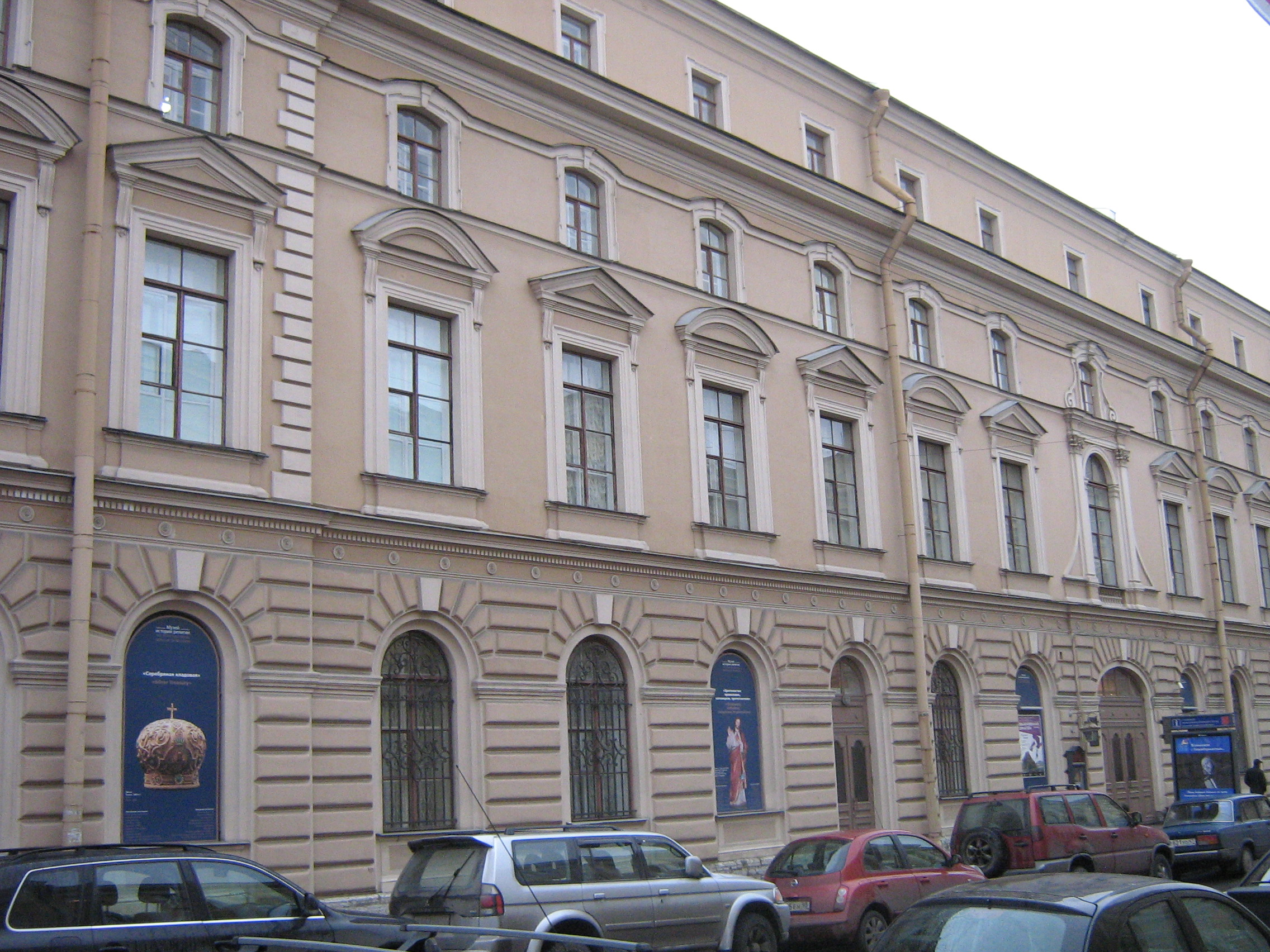

- Location in Saint Petersburg
- Established: 1932
- Location: Pochtamtskaya St., Saint Petersburg
- Coordinates: 59.931586°N 30.3012199°E
- Website: http://gmir.ru/

The Museum of the History of Religion is a museum in Saint Petersburg, Russia.

The museum was created in 1932 by a decision of the Presidium of the Soviet Academy of Sciences as the Museum of the History of Religion and Atheism and was housed in the former Kazan Cathedral until 2000. Its first exposition was based on an anti-religious exhibition opened in 1930 in the Winter Palace. Russian ethnographer and anthropologist Vladimir Bogoraz "Tan" was the initiator of its creation and its first director. In 1991, the house of Count Sergey Yaguzhinsky, which later belonged to the Russian imperial Post Office, was transferred to the museum of the History of Religion.

== See also ==
- List of museums in Saint Petersburg
