= Christian virtue =

Christian virtue may refer to:

- Seven virtues
  - Theological virtues

== See also ==
- Virtue
  - Virtue ethics
- Cardinal virtues
- Christian ethics
- Christian values
