= Old Katholikon of the Trinity Lavra =

Coordinates: 56°18′37.08″N 38°07′45.84″E

Trinity Cathedral
- Троицкий собор Троице-Сергиева монастыря
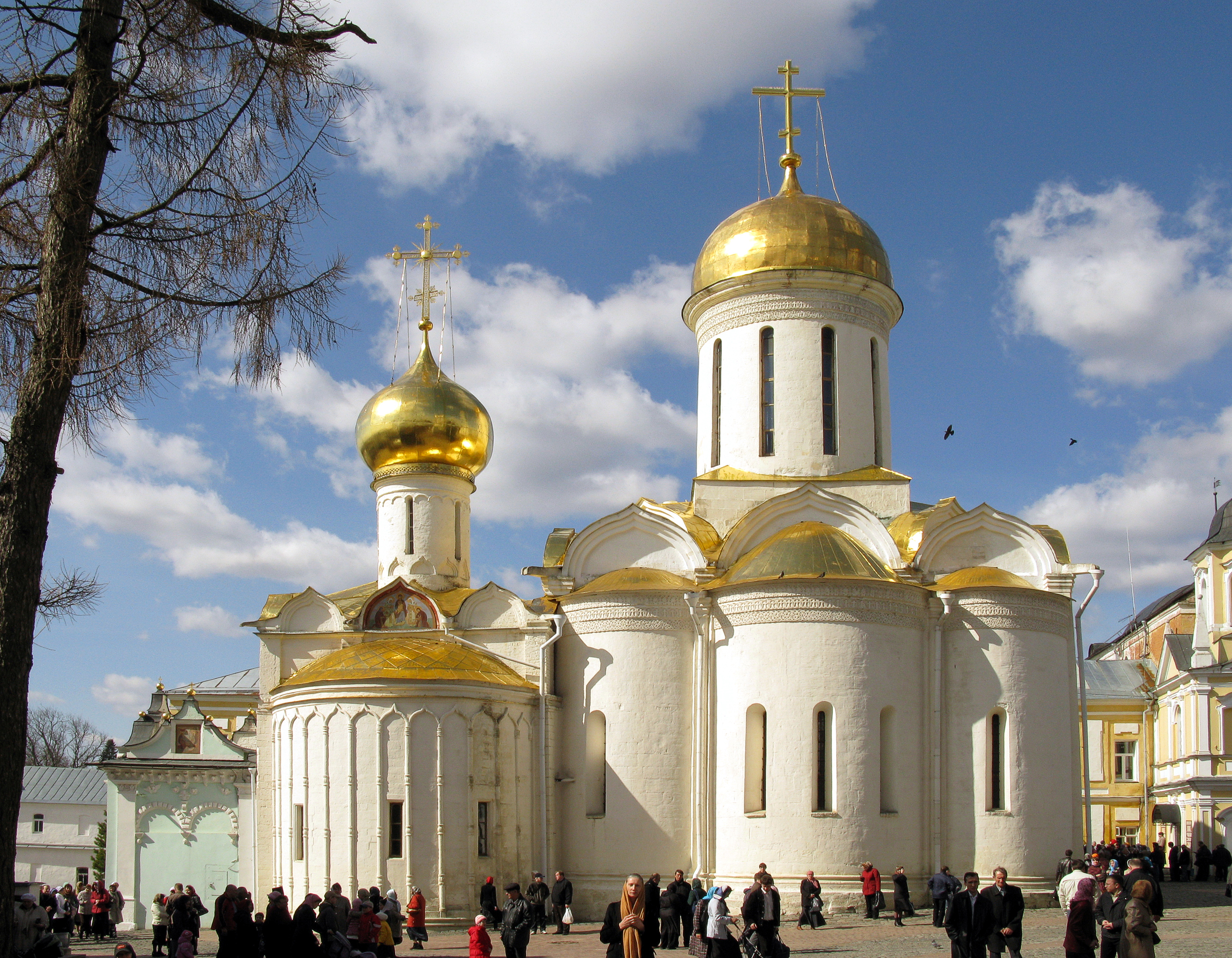
- The cathedral in 2005

- Location within Russia
- Location: Sergiyev Posad
- Country: Russia
- Denomination: Russian Orthodox
- Website: www.stsl.ru/about_lavra/all/troitskiy-sobor/

History
- Status: Cathedral

Architecture
- Style: A cross-in-square dome
- Years built: 1422–1423

Specifications
- Height: 30 m (98 ft)

The Trinity Cathedral (Russian: Троицкий собор) is the oldest surviving building in the Trinity Lavra of St. Sergius, located in Sergiyev Posad, Russia, near the capital Moscow.

== History ==
It was built in 1422–1423 by the Russian saint Nikon of Radonezh to "honour and praise" the founder of the lavra, the saint Sergius of Radonezh, whose relics are kept there. It is the main object of veneration in the Trinity Lavra. The cathedral was built from white stone. It is one of the most important examples of the early Muscovite architecture.

The history of the Trinity Lavra begins with the construction of the cathedral. The ancient wall painting, created by the famous painters Andrei Rublev and Daniel Chorny in 1425–1427, is lost. The remaining paintings were created in 1635. They reproduce the ancient iconography of the original. The main treasure of the cathedral is a five-tier iconostasis. Most of its icons were painted in the first third of the 15th century by Rublev and his colleagues. The original icon of The Trinity, painted by Rublev, and Boris Godunov's commissioned copy are kept in the iconostasis of the cathedral.

== Links ==
- Media related to Holy Trinity Cathedral of Troitse-Sergiyeva Lavra at Wikimedia Commons
- Official website (in Russian)
