= Revetment (disambiguation) =

Revetment may refer to:

- Revetment, a sloping structure used in erosion control (at a riverbank or coastline) or as part of military fortifications
- Revetment (aircraft), an area for parking aircraft that is protected by blast walls
- Riza, a metal cover protecting a religious icon
- A façade of stone slabs or decorated ceramic plaques used as the outer facing layer of a wall, especially in Ancient Roman architecture
