= Nikon of Radonezh =

Russian saint (1352–1426)

Saint Nikon of Radonezh
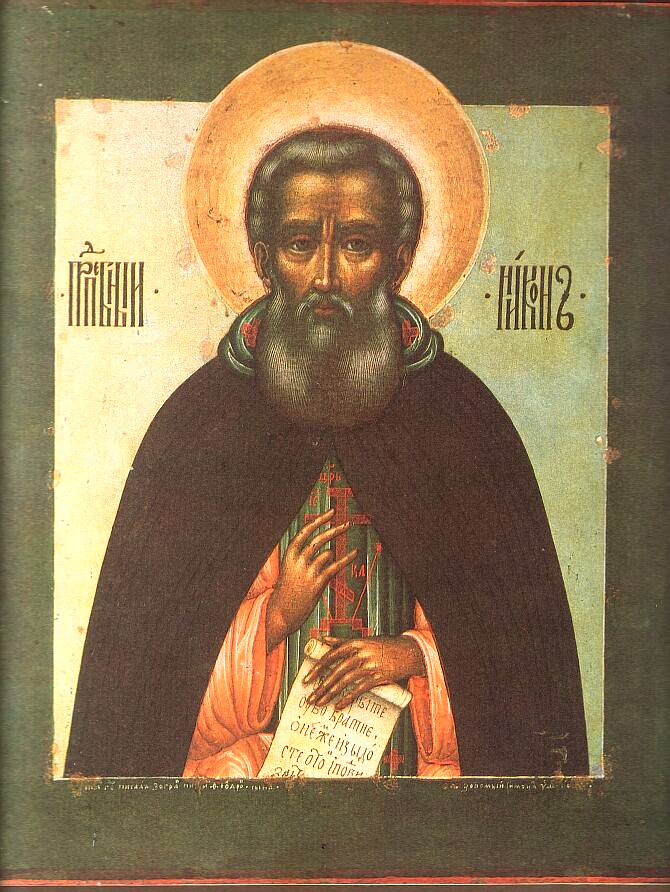
- Icon by Simon Ushakov, 17th century

The Venerable
- Born: 1352; Yuryev-Polsky
- Died: 17 November 1426 (aged 73–74); Sergiyev Posad
- Canonized: 1547 by Russian Orthodox Church
- Feast: 17 November and 6 July

Nikon of Radonezh (Russian: Никон Радонежский, romanized: Nikon Radonezhsky; 1352 – 17 November 1426) was a Russian abbot and a disciple of Sergius of Radonezh. He was the second abbot of the Trinity Monastery. In 1547, he was canonized as a saint by the Russian Orthodox Church at the Makaryev Sobor.

== Life ==
Nikon was born in 1352 in Yuryev-Polsky. According to his vita (life), he belonged to a wealthy merchant family. At a young age, he showed a desire for monasticism and left his parents' home. He went to the Trinity Monastery, founded by Sergius of Radonezh, to take monastic vows. Instead, he was sent to the Vysotsky Monastery, which was also founded by Sergius at the request of Vladimir the Bold.

Nikon was ordained as a priest, and around 1380, he took monastic vows at the Vysotsky Monastery. In 1382, he left Serpukhov and was accepted into the brotherhood by Sergius, although he did not become a close disciple until the final years of Sergius' life. In 1392, following Sergius' death, Nikon began to fulfil the duties of abbot at the Trinity Monastery. Sabbas of Storozhi served as abbot from 1392 to 1398, during which time Nikon went into seclusion. After his return, Nikon became abbot.

During his tenure as abbot, the monastery was devastated in 1408 as a result of Edigu's invasion of Russia. Epiphanius the Wise and his fellow monks fled to Tver as a result. Between 1409 and 1411, Nikon purchased nearby estates (including lands in Dmitrov and Radonezh) and expanded the territory of the monastery. In 1411, construction of a new wooden Trinity Cathedral was completed. In 1422, the relics of Sergius were uncovered by Nikon. By that time, the monastery's holdings had greatly increased, allowing the wooden cathedral to be moved to a new location and a stone cathedral to be built in its place. The new cathedral featured works by the icon painters Andrei Rublev and Daniel Chorny. Under Nikon, the Trinity Monastery became dominant in Russian spiritual life and a place of pilgrimage.

Nikon died on 17 November 1426 in the Trinity Monastery and was buried near Sergius. The monks built a wooden chapel adjacent to the monastery to house his remains, where they also interred twelve of Sergius' disciples and his hagiographer, Epiphanius.

== Veneration ==
The veneration of Nikon began in the Trinity Monastery and eventually spread to the other monasteries. This wider, national spread was due in part to members of the ruling dynasty frequently visiting the monastery, starting with Grand Prince Vasily II, who took it under his patronage in 1456.

In 1547, the Makaryev Sobor of the Russian Orthodox Church canonized him as a saint, establishing his feast day on 17 November. He is included in the list of "new miracle workers". The following year, a stone church was built over his grave.

== Sources ==
- "Никон, игумен Троицкой обители" . Brockhaus and Efron Encyclopedic Dictionary (in Russian). 1906.
- Bushkovitch, Paul (1992). Religion and Society in Russia: The Sixteenth and Seventeenth Centuries. Oxford University Press. ISBN 978-0-19-506946-4.
- Kuzmin, A. V. (2018). "Никон". Православная энциклопедия. Т. L: Никодим — Никон, Патриарх Антиохийский (in Russian). Moscow: Православная энциклопедия. pp. 713–725. ISBN 978-5-89572-057-8.
- Miller, David B. (5 November 2010). Saint Sergius of Radonezh, His Trinity Monastery, and the Formation of the Russian Identity. Cornell University Press. ISBN 978-1-5017-5661-0.
