= Komba BAKH =

Russian musical group

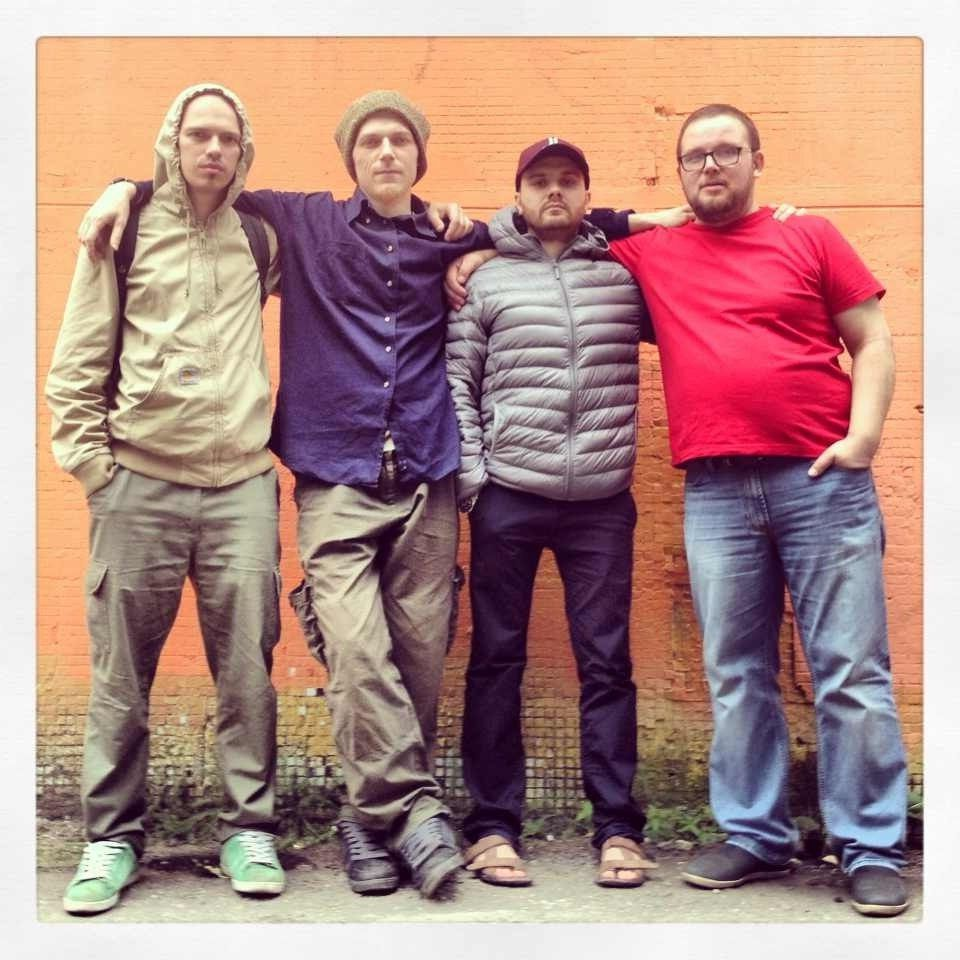
- The group in 2012

Background information
- Origin: Kostroma, Russia
- Genres: Hip-hop
- Years active: 2000–present
- Label: The Underground Studio N.O.G.A.
- Members: Nikita Barinov; Alexey Logvinov (Apollo); Stanislav Prigorelov; Gregory Hloponin
- Website: www.kombabakh.ru

Komba BAKH is a Russian musical and artistic group which has released 55 albums and created a number of murals. Its members met while attending Lyceum 34 in Kostroma, and formed the group in 2000. After an education in art and music, they began creating pastel murals and founded a record company in 2001.

== History ==
The four became friends at school, formed a band and created an 18-metre (59 ft) pastel mural (their first) on the stucco wall of a children's nature center. After it was damaged by fire several times, it was dismantles a few years later. Two band members also painted the walls around the Kostroma rail station. Although the pastels were fragile, the technique allowed their fingers direct contact with the wall; their drawing skills were developed with crayons.

After recording an unreleased first album the group switched to breakbeat, recording samples from cassette tape, radio and LPs from the collection of Apollo's father, Archpriest Andrei Logvinov. In addition to samples, Apollo recorded bass guitars, keyboards and drum-machine software.

CDs were distributed to friends and family members, and the band performed at Kostroma State University in December 2003. The purchase of their first mixing console and microphone in 2004 improved the quality of their recorded music. After the 22nd album, Anna Glinina and Ilya Pick (flute and vocals) joined the band; around that time, they participated in rap festivals in Ivanovo.

By 2007, Komba BAKH members were Apollo (guitars, vocals), Ilya Pick (flute, vocals), Beanpole (bass, vocals), Sergei Tsimliakov (bass, domra), Anna Glinina-Tsimliakova (vocals), Potup (vocals, keyboards), Kvadra (vocals, trumpet) and Ivan Bolotov (drums). They rehearsed at night at a local music school. Early performances included a Kostroma song festival in December, 2007 and January 2008 and a February 14, 2008 show in Belgorod. Journalist Alexandre Gorbachev wrote several articles about the group, and they were mentioned in Zavtra.

Komba BAKH performed in Moscow, St. Petersburg, Yekaterinburg and Yaroslavl. The band's membership changed several times; Natalia Eremina joined in 2013, and Anna and Sergei Tsimliakov, Nikolai Morosov (guitar) and Valentin Filippov (bass, percussion) left. A Korg D-888 portable studio enhanced their live performances.

== 54 Live ==
The group increased its performance repertoire to 54 songs, including instrumentals. By its 54th online release, Komba BAKH decided to perform all its compositions live using a Fender Rhodes electric piano. The elaborate program was performed in Moscow, St. Petersburg and Kostroma, where it was recorded and filmed.

== Painting ==
Komba BAKH was influenced artistically by the 14th-century painter Andrei Rublev and his colleague, Daniel Chorny. Their paintings have carpet-like filling with a number of motifs (flowers, animals, decorations, landscapes, fantasy, architecture and occasionally portraits) copied from photographs and drawings by other artists. In addition to crayons and pastels, they use oil and acrylic. The ephemeral street art was eventually destroyed or painted over. Apollo was commissioned to paint a 9-metre (30 ft) board fence in oil. The group's largest work was a 48-by-2-metre (157.5 by 6.6 ft) wall around a football pitch in Belarus. It was painted from August to October 2011. In May 2014, nine Komba BAKH works were shown in an exhibition by young painters.

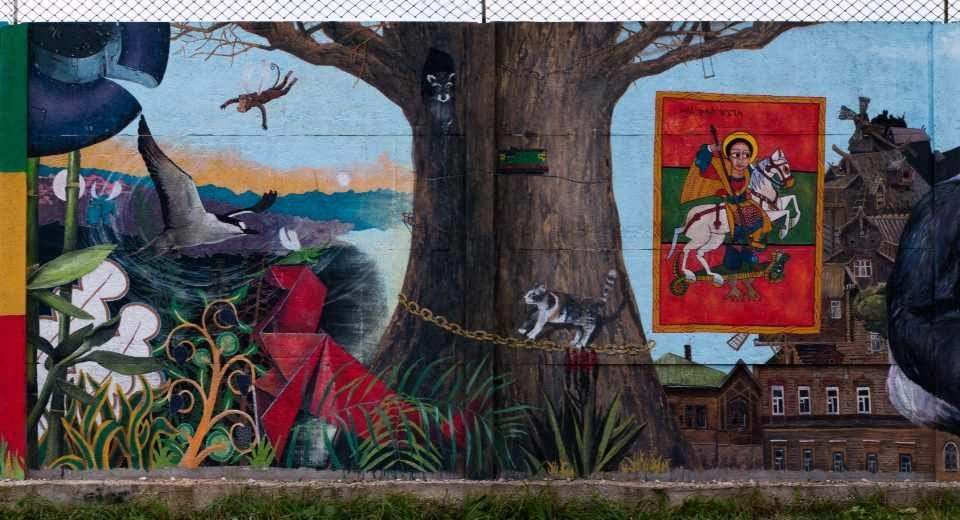
48-by-2-meter wall painting in Belarus
