= Makaryev Sobors =

1547 and 1549 meetings of the Russian Orthodox Church

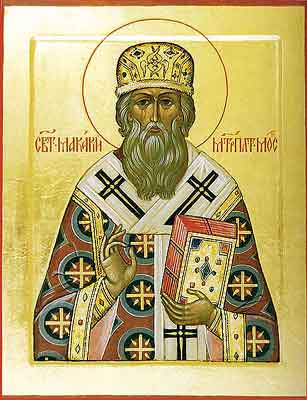
Macarius, Metropolitan of Moscow

Makaryev Sobors (Russian: Макарьевские соборы) were two Local Council meetings of the Russian Orthodox Church, convened in 1547 and 1549 by Macarius, Metropolitan of Moscow, for the purpose of canonization of Russian saints. For this reason, the period Makarevskuyu cathedrals called "new era of miracle workers". According to the church historian AV Kartasheva, Metropolitan Macarius called these churches for the purpose of canonization Russian saints, based on the understanding of the "special position of the Russian Church in the Universe" and "fait accompli political unification of Russia".

Makary cathedrals finally formed canonization procedure for solving the conciliar bishops and with the approval of the primate of the Church. Initially, researchers believed that only consolidated data Cathedrals liturgical celebration of the saints, the former previously Locally, in the church-wide scale. The notion that made a number of cathedrals canonization of saints, is available in Metropolitan Macarius (Bulgakov), but the first time that they were intended only canonized saints, wrote historian Vasily Klyuchevsky. Modern scholars believe that these churches were rather liturgical than kanonizatsionnymi - that is, had not intended to glorify the new saints as their veneration known in dosoborny period and systematization of data hagiography of saints and their approval hymnography.

== Council of 1547 ==
The Council of 1547 opened on February 26, the week of the Triumph of Orthodoxy. The list of saints glorified at the council is known from the council decree on the celebration of saints. It has been preserved in three lists, which differ significantly from each other (the number of canonized saints varies from 11 to 14 in relation to general church saints, the number of locally venerated saints in all lists is the same - 9). According to the research of historian Yevgeny Golubinsky, the following saints were canonized by the council:

	General Church saints	Locally venerated saints
Common to all lists of the decree	Jonah of Moscow; John of Novgorod; Pafnuty Borovsky; Nikon of Radonezh; Makarii Kalyazinsky; Mikhail Klopsky; Zosimas of Solovki; Sabbatius of Solovki; Pavel Obnorsky; Dionysius Glushitsky; Alexander Svirsky	Maxim of Moscow, the holy fool; Prince Constantine of Murom and his sons Feodor and Mikhail; Peter and Fevronia of Murom; Arseny Tverskoy; Procopius of Ustyug; John of Ustyug
Specified in various versions of the decree	Alexander Nevsky; Nicetas of Novgorod; Sabbas of Storozhi	

All saints glorified by this council for general church veneration are called miracle workers, with Jonah, John, Paphnutius, and Macarius being called great miracle workers, and the rest new. It is especially noted in the act that the canonization of Alexander Nevsky took place “with every test of miracles occurring from the honorable reliquary.”

== Council of 1549 ==
The act of the Council of 1549 has not survived. It is known from the speech of Tsar Ivan IV to the Stoglav Synod of 1551, and the list of canonized persons was determined by Yevgeny Golubinsky based on a comparison of the full list of saints canonized by Macarius with the decree of the Council of 1547. Since this council did not divide saints into those universally venerated and those locally venerated, researchers distinguish among the 16 saints canonized at it those who already had local veneration and new ones.

Those who had the status of locally venerated	Newly glorified saints
Euthymius II of Novgorod; Jacob of Rostov; Stefan Permsky; Vsevolod of Pskov; Mikhail Tverskoy; Abraham of Smolensk; Vilnius Martyrs Anthony, John, and Eustathius; Euthymius of Suzdal; Savva Vishersky; Ephraim Perekomsky	Niphont of Novgorod; Jonah of Novgorod; Grigory Pelshemsky; Euphrosynus of Pskov

== Feast day ==
In memory of the canonization of the saints at the Makaryev Sobors, a feast day was established: the Feast of Russian Miracle Workers, glorified by Saint Macarius in 1547 and 1549. After the canonization of the saints at the Makaryev Sobors, a monk of the Spaso-Evfimiev Suzdal Monastery, Gregory, composed a service in which all Russian saints were collectively glorified. In the canon, after listing the names of all-Russian saints, glorified even earlier, there follow the names of saints canonized at the Councils of 1547 and 1549. The lives of the glorified saints were included in the second and third editions of the Great Menaion Reader, the Dormition and Tsar's lists.

The celebration of the council takes place on July 16 (New Style July 29), the day after the memory of Saint Vladimir the Great.
