= Dormition Cathedral, Vladimir =

Cathedral in Vladimir, Russia

- Собор Успения Пресвятой Богородицы
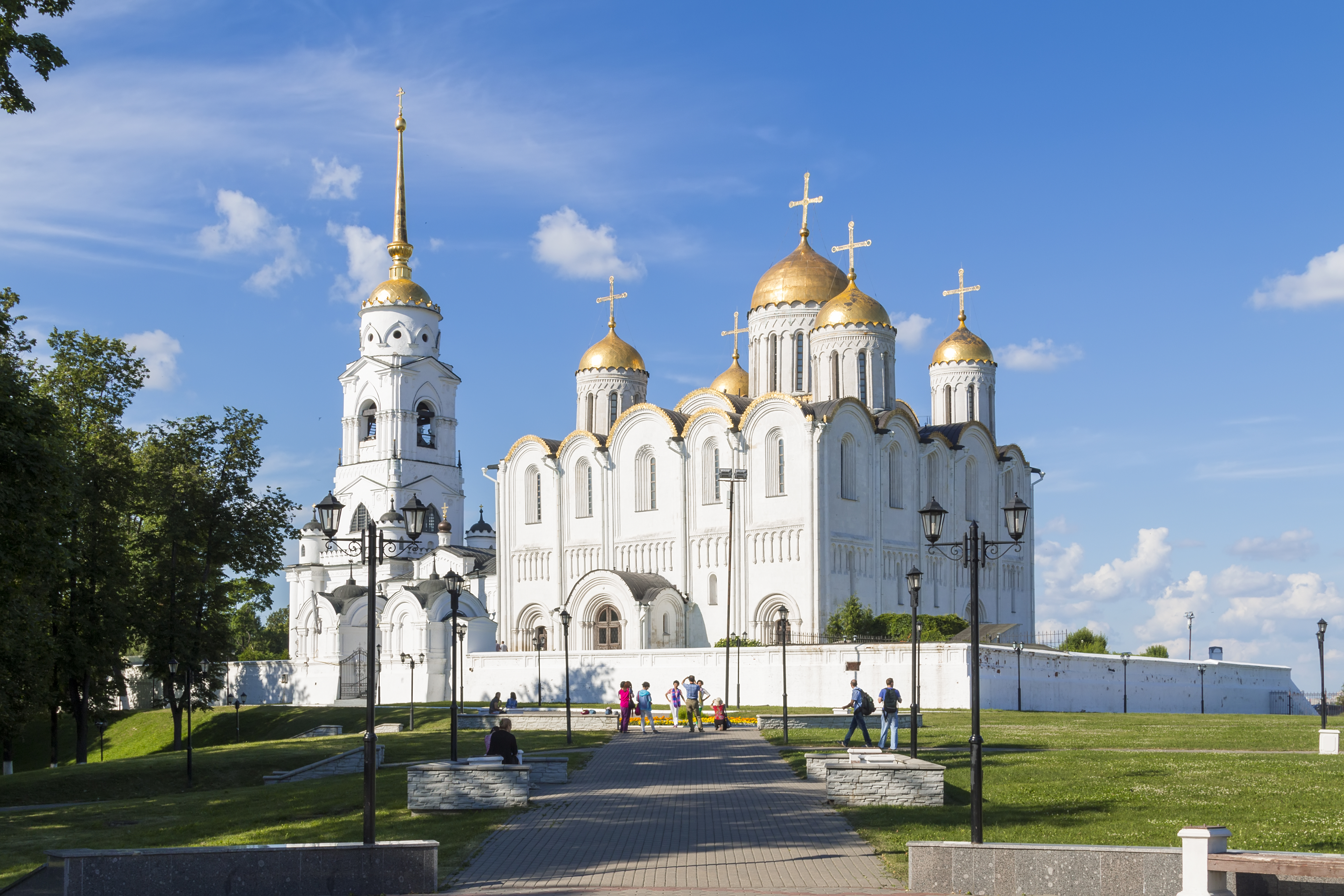

Religion
- Affiliation: Russian Orthodox
- Ecclesiastical or organisational status: Cathedral of the Russian Orthodox Eparchy of Vladimir
- Year consecrated: 1160

Location
- Location: Vladimir, Vladimir Oblast, Russia.
- Interactive map of Dormition Cathedral, Vladimir
- Coordinates: 56°07′37″N 40°24′33″E

Architecture
- Architect: Russian architects
- Type: Russian romanic
- Style: Cross-domed church
- Completed: 1189

Specifications
- Width: 30.8 m (101 ft)
- Height (max): 32.3 m

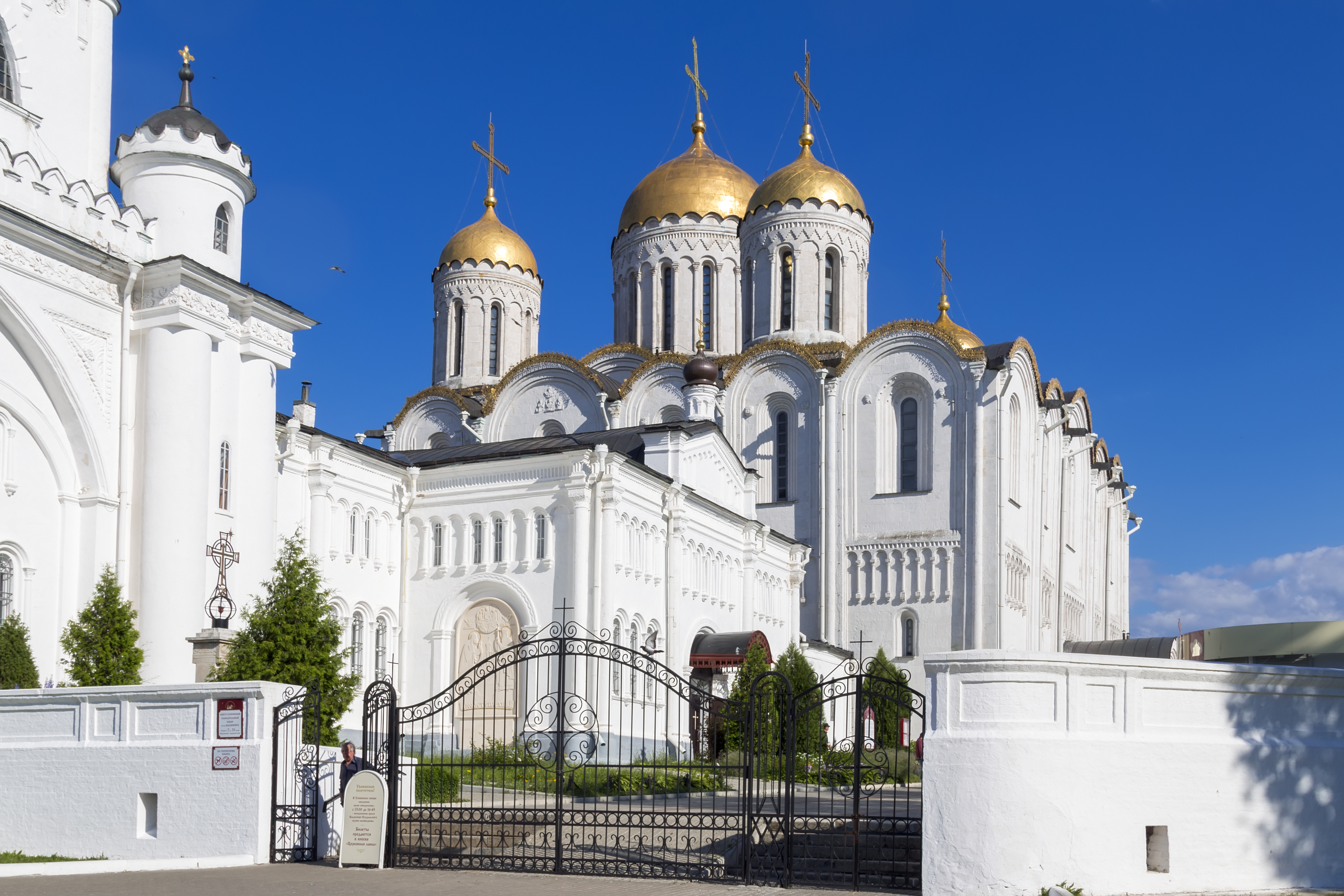
Entrance

The Dormition Cathedral, also known as the Assumption Cathedral (Russian: Собор Успения Пресвятой Богородицы, romanized: Sobor Uspeniya Presvyatoy Bogoroditsy), is a Russian Orthodox church in Vladimir, Russia. It is regarded as the mother church of Russia through the 13th century. It is part of a World Heritage Site, the White Monuments of Vladimir and Suzdal.

== History ==
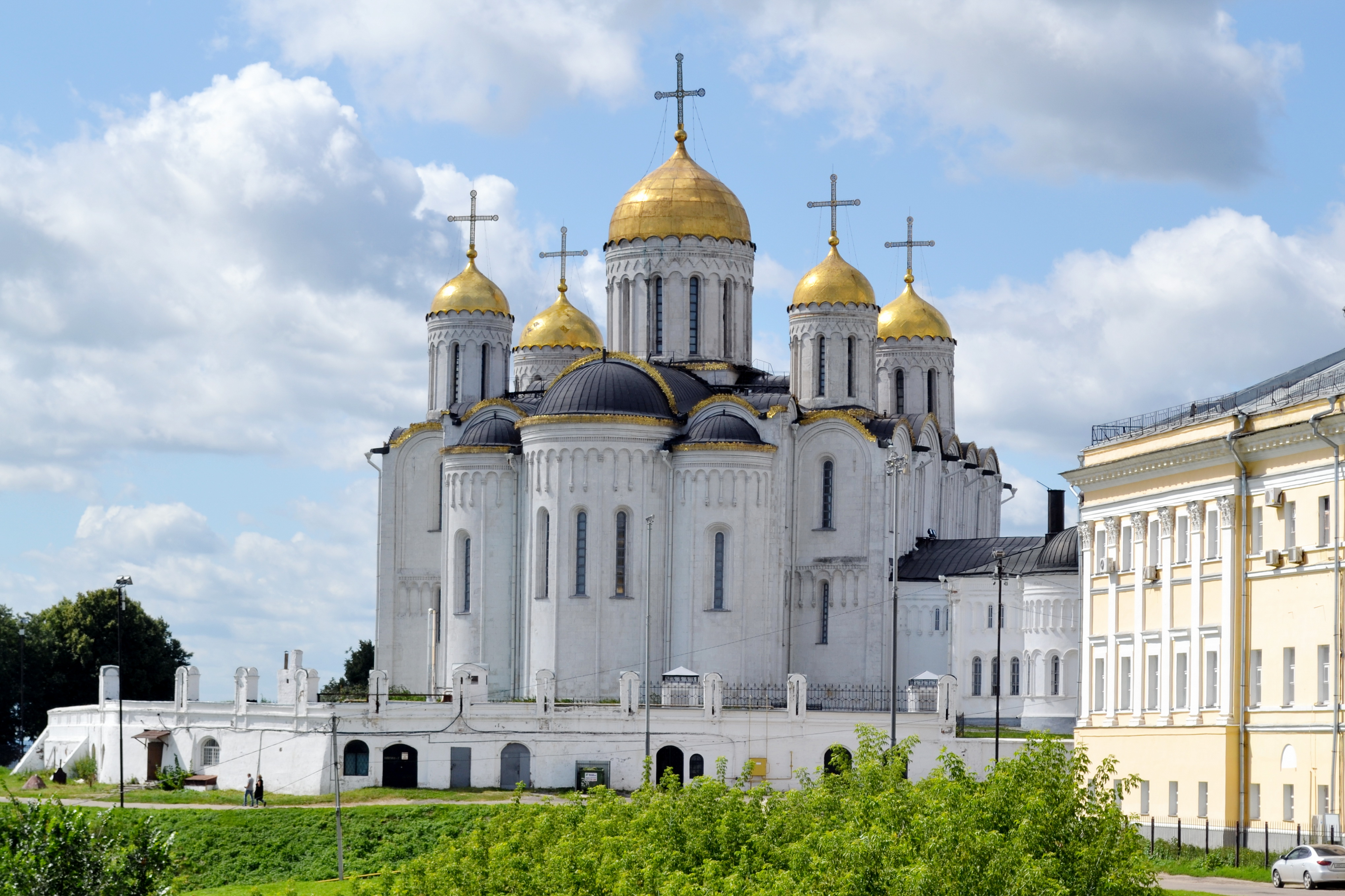
North-east view

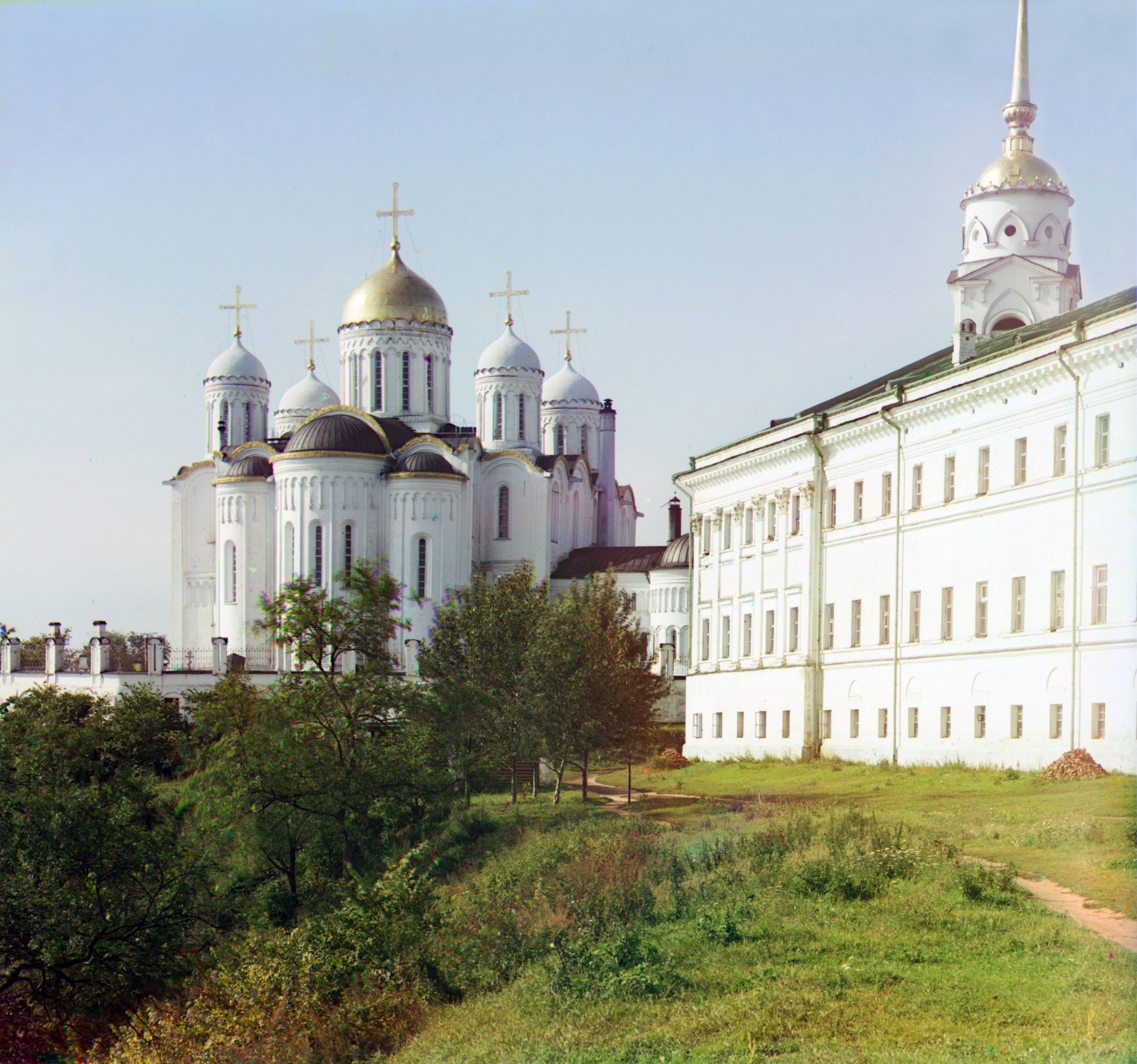
The cathedral in 1912 as documented by color photography pioneer Sergey Prokudin-Gorsky

The cathedral was commissioned by the Grand Prince of Vladimir, Andrew the Pious (r. 1157–1174), in his capital, Vladimir, and dedicated to the Dormition of the Mother of God (Virgin Mary), whom Andrew promoted as the patron saint of his lands. Originally erected between 1158 and 1160, the cathedral, with six pillars and five domes, was expanded from 1185 to 1189 to reflect the augmented prestige of Vladimir. At 1,178 square metres (12,680 sq ft), it remained the largest Russian church for several hundred years.

Andrew the Pious, Vsevolod the Big Nest (r. 1176–1212) and other rulers of Vladimir-Suzdal were interred in the crypt of this church. Unlike many other churches, the cathedral survived to some extent the great devastation and fire of Vladimir in 1238, when the Mongol hordes of Batu Khan captured the city.

The exterior walls of the church are covered with elaborate carvings. The interior was painted in the 12th century and then repainted by Andrei Rublev and Daniil Chernyi in 1408. The Dormition Cathedral served as a model for Aristotele Fioravanti when he designed the eponymous cathedral in the Moscow Kremlin in 1475 to 1479. A lofty belltower, combining genuine Russian, Gothic and Neoclassical influences, was erected nearby in 1810.
