= Tsata =

Form of jewelry

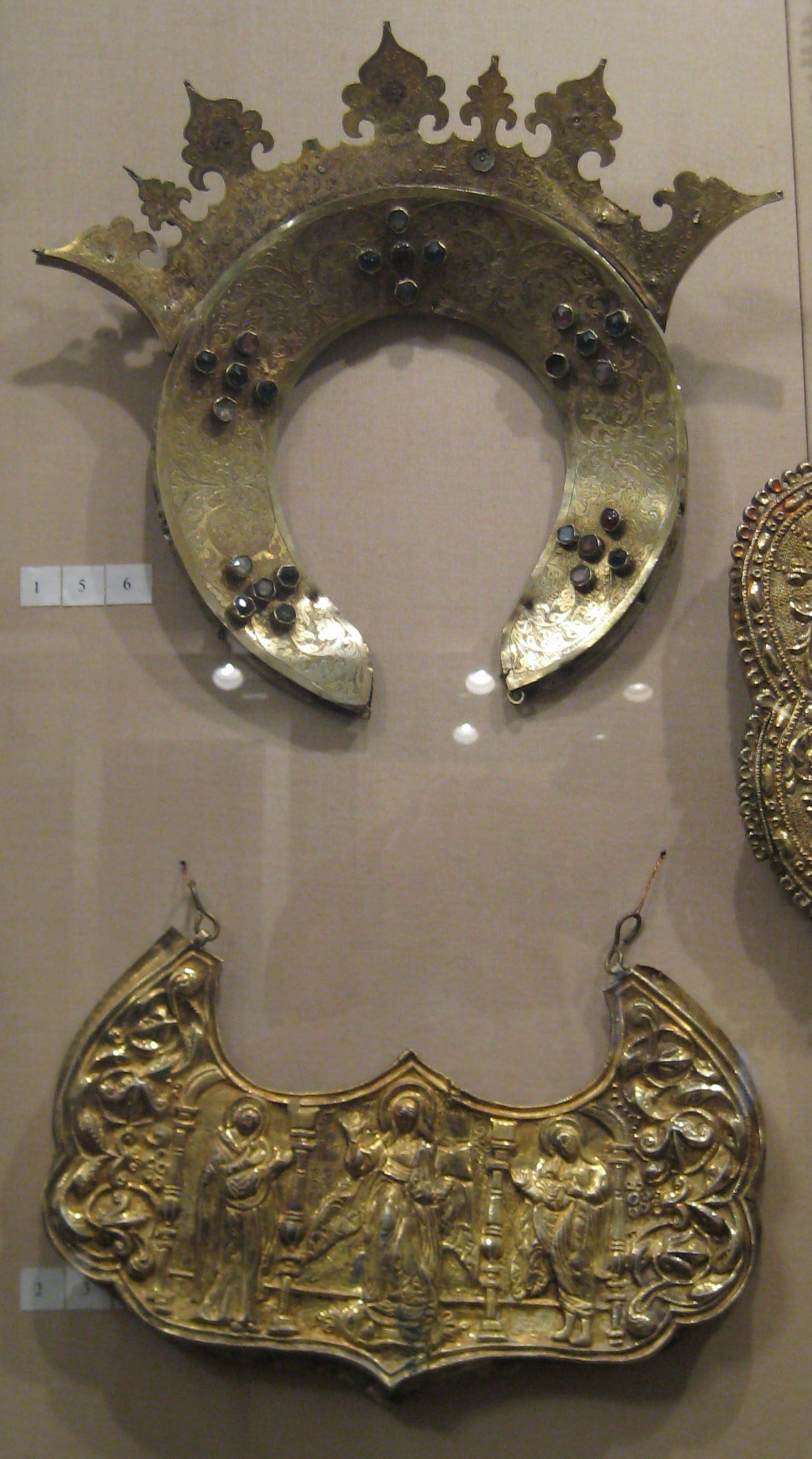
The crown (venets) and the tsata from Pskov, The Pskov Museum, 17th c.

Tsata (Russian: цата, IPA: [ˈtsatə]) is a form of jewelry in the shape of a turned over crescent, typically made from gold or silver. It is placed at the bottom of a riza as a part of the icon decoration in the Eastern Orthodox Church. The tsata looks like a gorget or neck ring. The word derives from the Old Church Slavonic world tsęta (цѧта; meaning "small coin") which in turn derives from Latin: centus. It is specifically attached to the riza so that it is placed under the face of a saint, and it typically fastened by its edges to the inner bottom edge of a venets (a halo or a crown above the saint's head).

Tsatas could contain a pattern (imprinted, stamped, filigree), gemstones and other design elements. They were a part of most Holy Trinity, Jesus, Virgin Mary icons. They were also used for the icons of some most highly venerated saints of the Orthodox Church, such as John the Baptist, Saint Nicholas, Sergius of Radonezh. The crescent has always been an important symbol for the Eastern Orthodox Church, and tsata itself symbolized a high rank of the saint in the Kingdom of God. Tsata is also a part of the Orthodox cross (placed at the bottom).

== See also ==
- Torc
