= Sergiyev Posad =

City in Moscow Oblast, Russia

Sergiyev Posad Сергиев Посад
- City
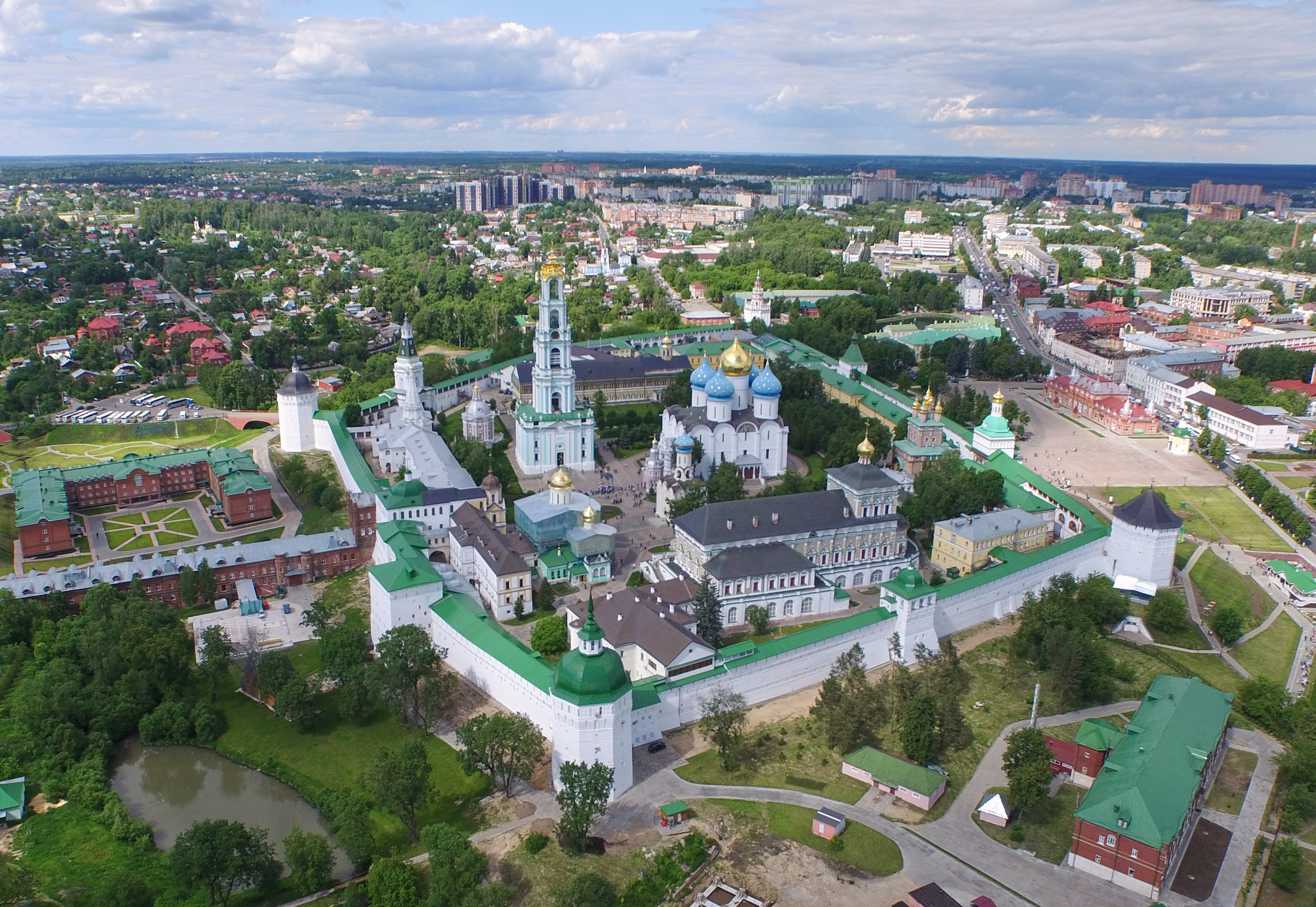
- Central part of the city with Trinity Lavra

- Flag Coat of arms
- Interactive map of Sergiyev Posad
- Location of Sergiyev Posad Sergiyev Posad (Europe) Sergiyev Posad (Russia)
- Coordinates: 56°18′54″N 38°08′12″E
- Country: Russia
- Federal subject: Moscow Oblast
- Administrative district: Sergiyevo-Posadsky District
- CitySelsoviet: Sergiyev Posad
- Founded: 1347
- City status since: 1782

Government
  - Body: Council of Deputies

Area
  - Total: 50.40 km^{2} (19.46 sq mi)
- Elevation: 210 m (690 ft)

Population (2010 Census)
  - Total: 111,179
  - Estimate (2025): 98,251 (−11.6%)
  - Rank: 142nd in 2010
  - Density: 2,206/km^{2} (5,713/sq mi)

Administrative status
  - Capital of: Sergiyevo-Posadsky District, City of Sergiyev Posad

Municipal status
  - Municipal district: Sergiyevo-Posadsky Municipal District
  - Urban settlement: Sergiyev Posad Urban Settlement
  - Capital of: Sergiyevo-Posadsky Municipal District, Sergiyev Posad Urban Settlement
- Time zone: UTC+3 (MSK)
- Postal codes: 141300–141315, 141318
- Dialing code: +7 496
- OKTMO ID: 46728000001
- Website: www.sergiev-posad.net

Sergiyev Posad (Russian: Сергиев Посад, IPA: [ˈsʲɛrgʲɪ(j)ɪf pɐˈsat]) is a city that is the administrative center of Sergiyevo-Posadsky District in Moscow Oblast, Russia. Population: 111,179 (2010 census); 113,581 (2002 census); 114,696 (1989 Soviet census).

The city contains the Trinity Lavra of St. Sergius, where Moscow Theological Academy is also located.

The city was previously known by its current name until 1919, later it was renamed as Sergiyev (until 1930) and Zagorsk (until 1991).

== History ==
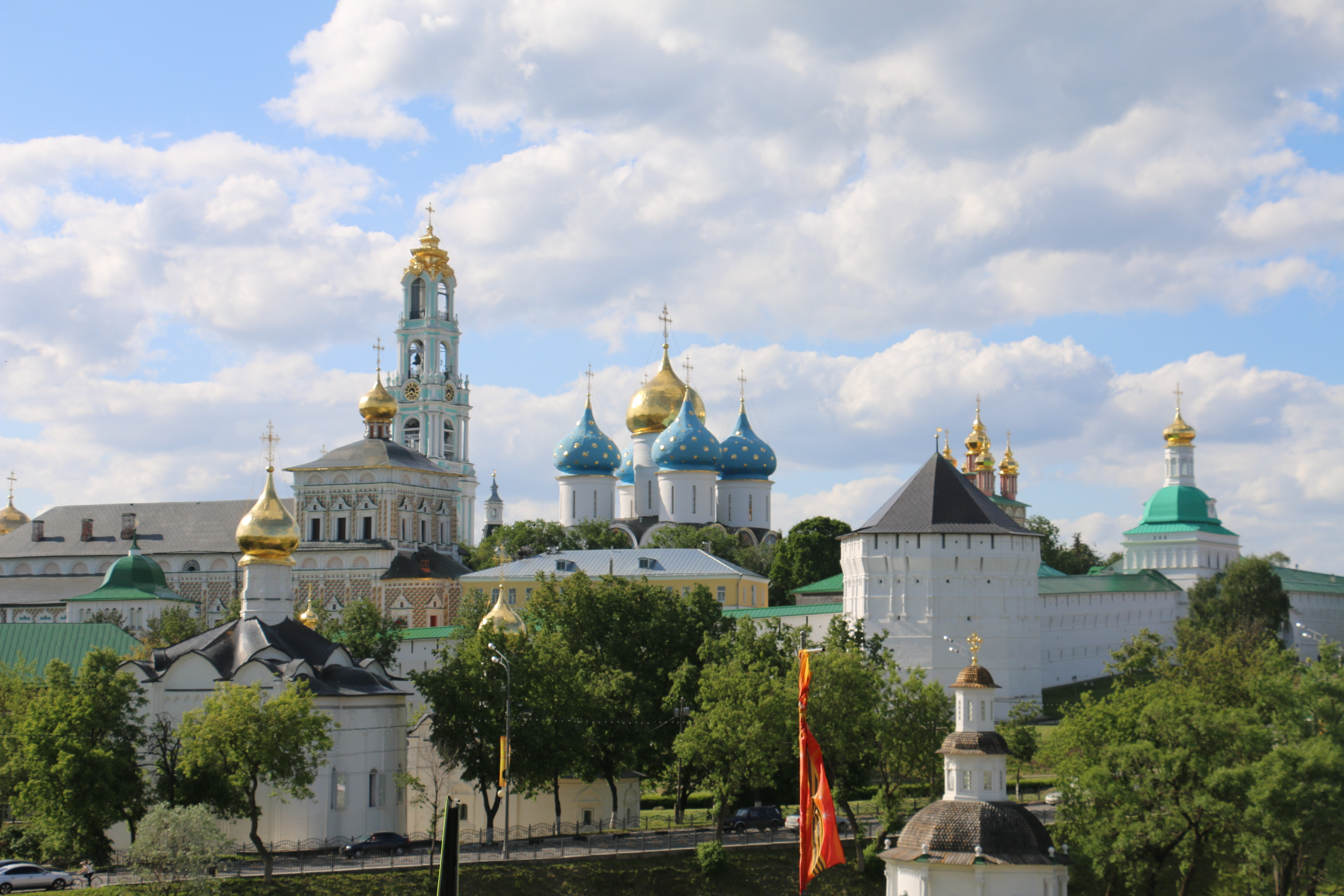
Trinity Lavra of St. Sergius in Sergiyev Posad

Sergiyev Posad is the religious center of the Moscow Region as its first monastery was founded in 1337. The monastery began as a church built by Sergius of Radonezh, made out of wood, and by 1345 was recognized as a place of religious worship. Town status was granted to Sergiyev Posad in 1742. In the 16th and 17th centuries, the religious center continued expanding into new monastery buildings, living areas, and stone walls, which withheld a Polish siege from 1608 to 1610. In the 18th century, wooden monasteries were mostly destroyed and began reconstruction and settlement (roads, hotels, stable, and hospice).

Lavra was closed in 1919 after the Russian Revolution, like all other places of worship in the Soviet Union. The town's name, alluding to St. Sergius, has strong religious connotations. Soviet authorities changed it first to just Sergiyev in 1919 and then to Zagorsk in 1930 in memory of the revolutionary Vladimir Zagorsky.

The original name was restored in 1991.

== Administrative and municipal status ==
Within the framework of administrative divisions, Sergiyev Posad serves as the administrative center of Sergiyevo-Posadsky District. As an administrative division, it is, together with twenty-six rural localities, incorporated within Sergiyevo-Posadsky District as the City of Sergiyev Posad. As a municipal division, the City of Sergiyev Posad is incorporated within Sergiyevo-Posadsky Municipal District as Sergiyev Posad Urban Settlement.

== Culture ==
The culture of Sergiyev Posad focuses on its religious and toymaking history, as well as classical music and art. The Sergiyev Posad State History and Art Museum-Preserve contain the Lavra complex of monasteries, and the Konny Dvor museum, which consists of art and excavated artifacts. In addition to the Lavra monasteries, the Chernigovsky Skete was built as a men's monastery in the 19th century, providing space for over 400 monks. Today, the Skete is quiet and peaceful, with only 10 monks coming to complete its everyday functions.

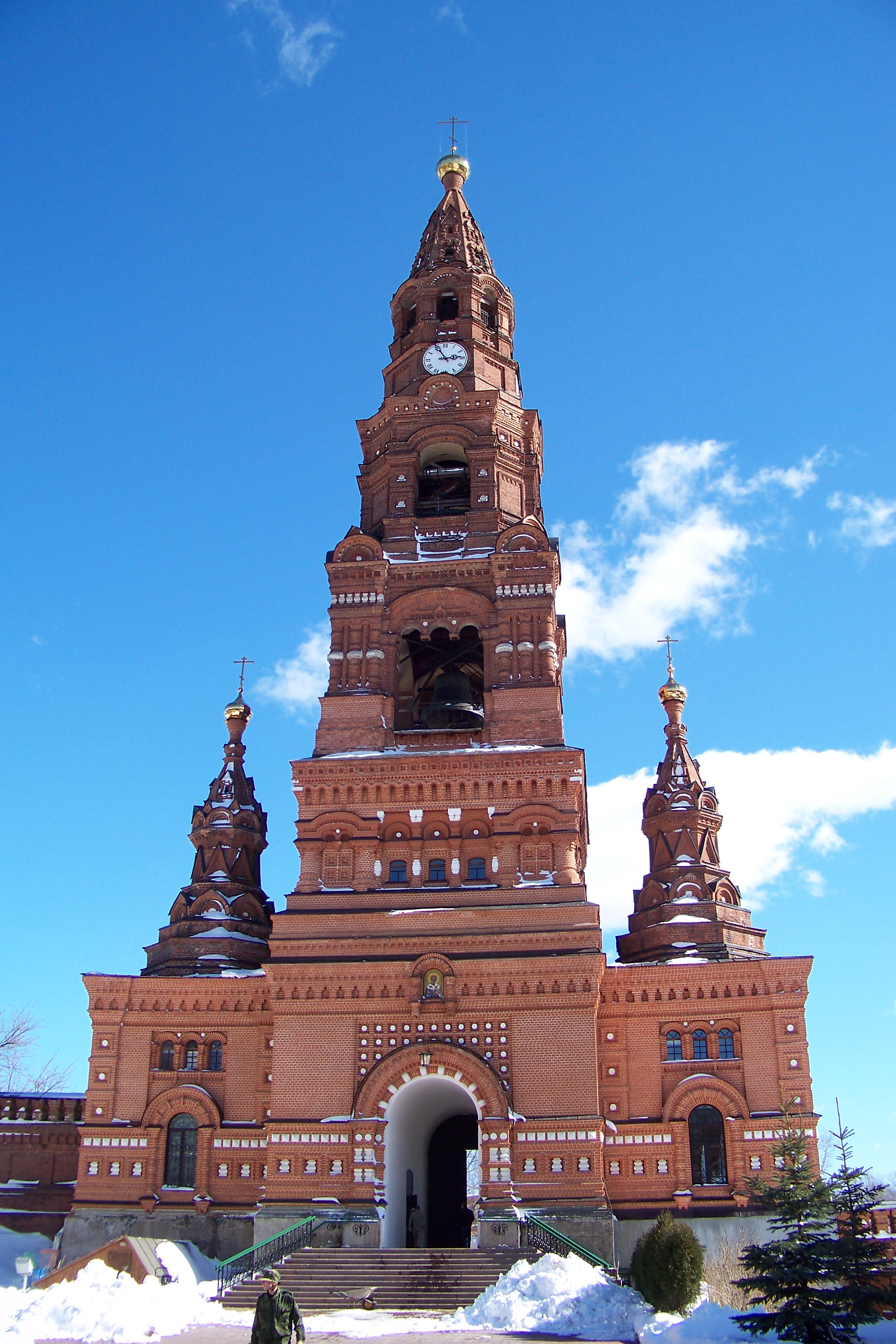
Chernigovsky Skete belfry

The Russian wooden toys, matryoshkas, were invented there by an artist Sergey Malyutin, and are now displayed in the Toy Museum. There are over 800 exhibits from the 11-21st century, including artifacts from other countries. The town has deep-rooted focus on art and music and has many schools for children, who are enrolled between 6–8 years old. It is home to the Yuri Gagarin Palace of Culture, a Russian Heritage Building.

== Economy and transportation ==
Tourism associated with the Golden Ring plays a role in the regional economy. There is an important toy factory and Zagorsk Optical-Mechanical Plant.

The Moscow–Yaroslavl railway and highway pass through the town. Sergiyev Posad Bus Terminal is located in the city.

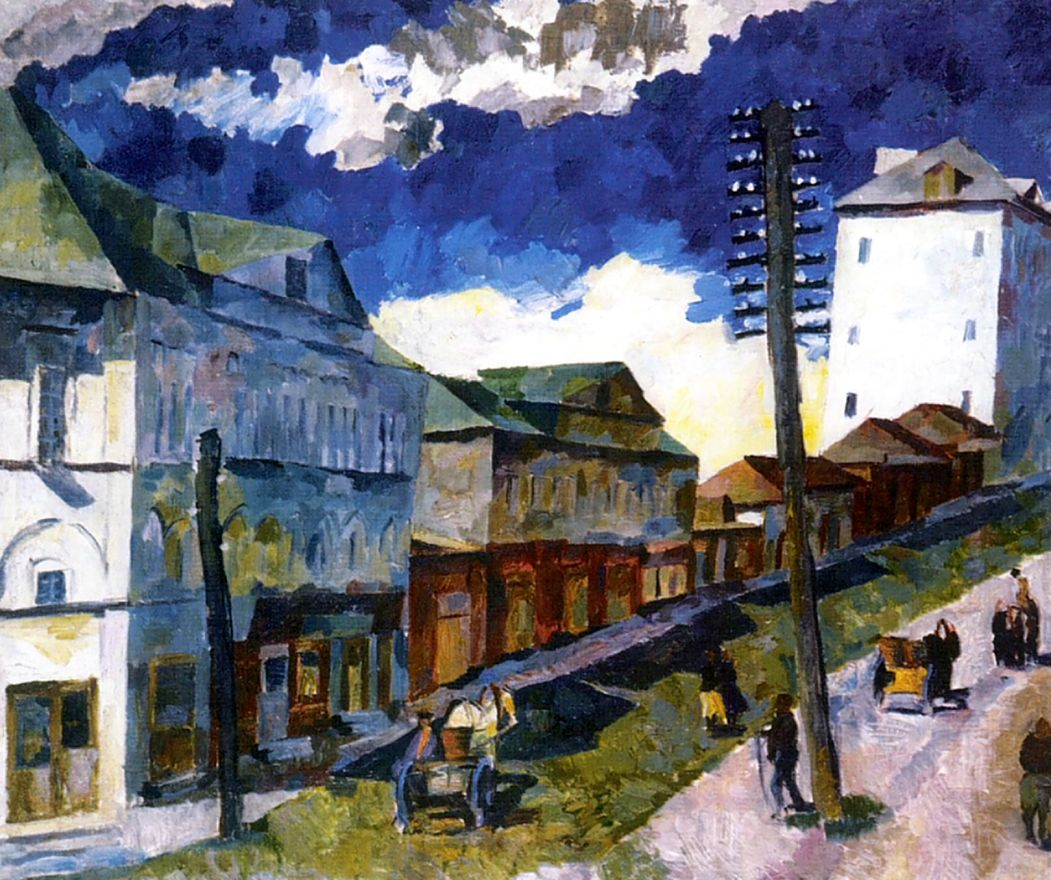
Street in Sergiyev Posad by Aristarkh Lentulov

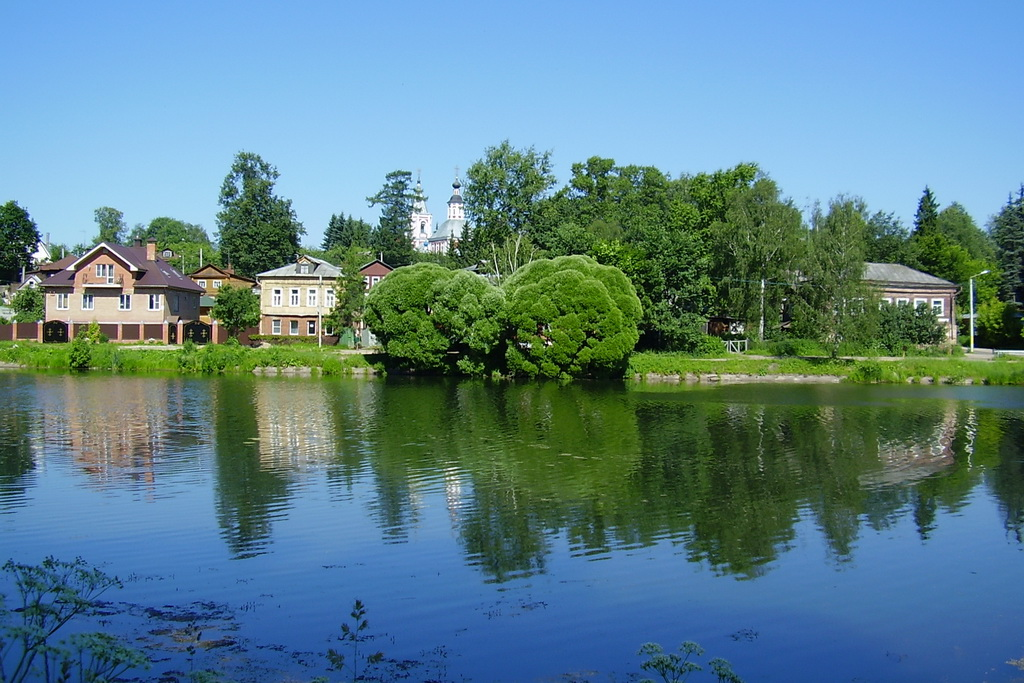
Kelarsky pond

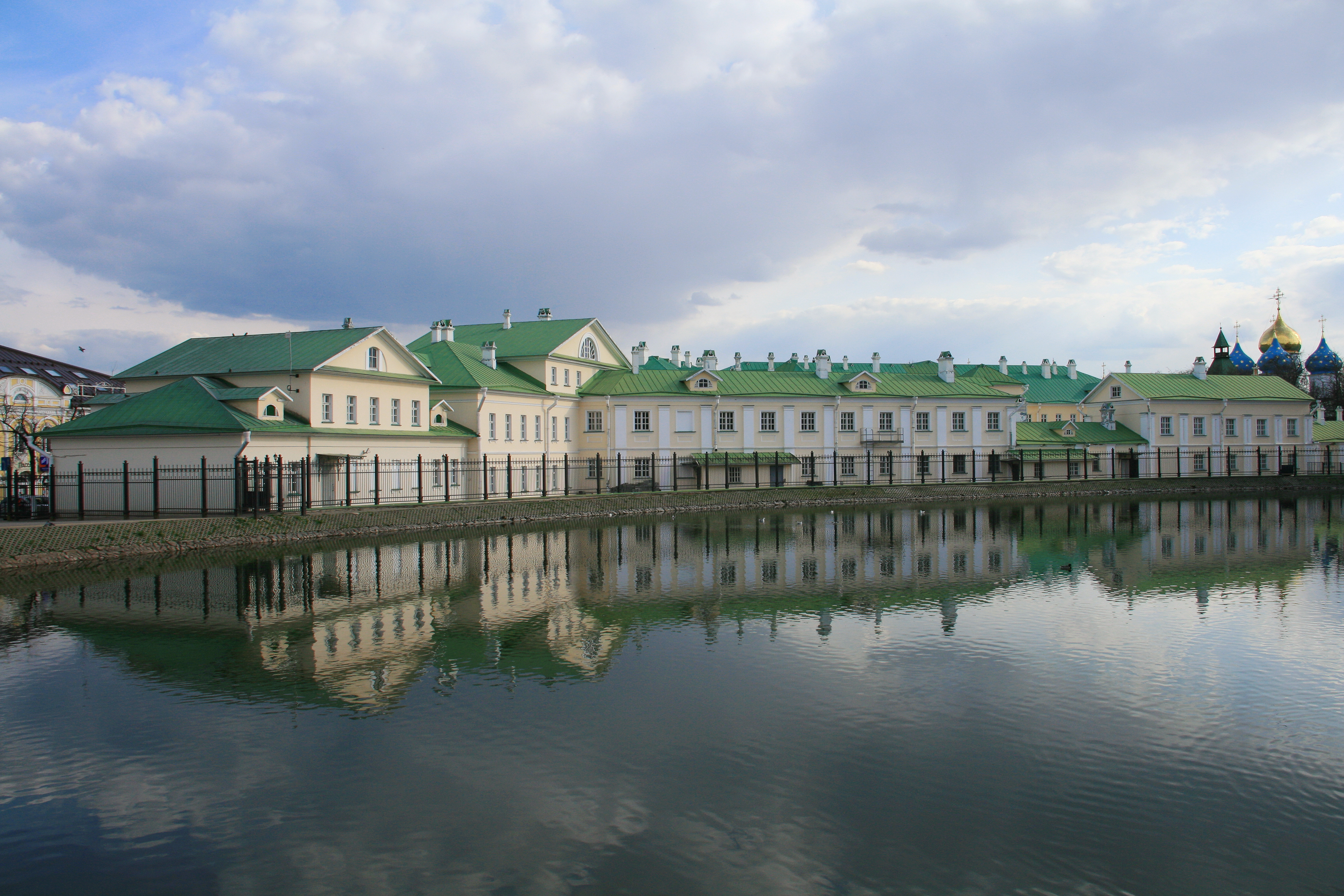
Lavra Hotel

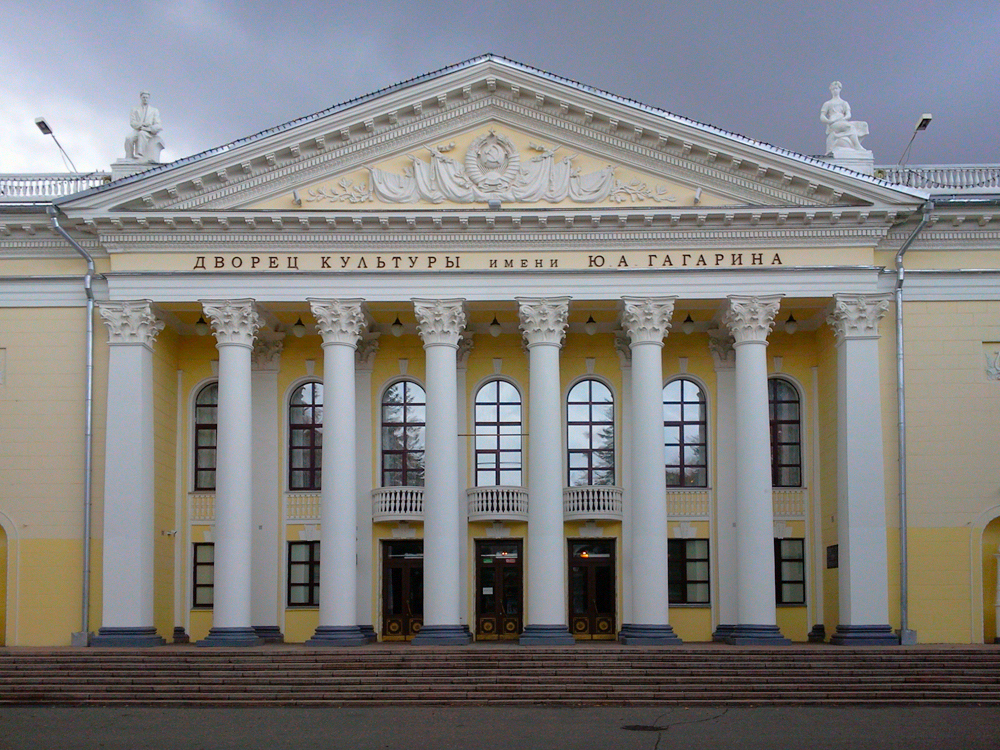
Yuri Gagarin Palace of Culture

== Notable people ==
- Andrei Rublev, artist, Church iconography, lived in the 14-15th centuries, author of Saint Trinity's icon
- Zhanna Bichevskaya, Soviet/Russian singer and folk musician
- Daniel Chorniy, artist, Church iconography, lived in the 14-15th centuries
- Pavel Florensky, Russian Orthodox theologian and researcher
- Vikentii Trofimov, painter
- Vladimir Favorsky, graphic artist, woodcut illustrator, painter
- Aristarkh Lentulov, avant-garde artist
- Boris Kustodiev, painter
- Mikhail Nesterov, painter
- German Sterligov, businessman
- Ivan Demidov (born 2005), ice hockey player, picked 5th overall in the 2024 NHL draft by the Montreal Canadiens

== Twin towns – sister cities ==
Sergiyev Posad is twinned with:

- Cephalonia, Greece
- Fulda, Germany
- (Georgia (country)) New Athos, Georgia
- Rueil-Malmaison, France
- Saldus, Latvia
- Slonim, Belarus
- Vagharshapat, Armenia

Former twin towns:

- Gniezno, Poland

In March 2022, the Polish city of Gniezno severed its ties with Sergiyev Posad as a response to the 2022 Russian invasion of Ukraine.
