= Riza =

Metal cover protecting an icon

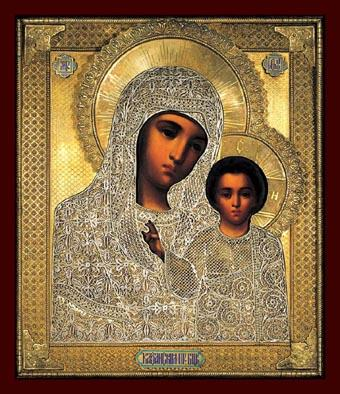
Icon of Our Lady of Kazan covered with a gilded silver riza.

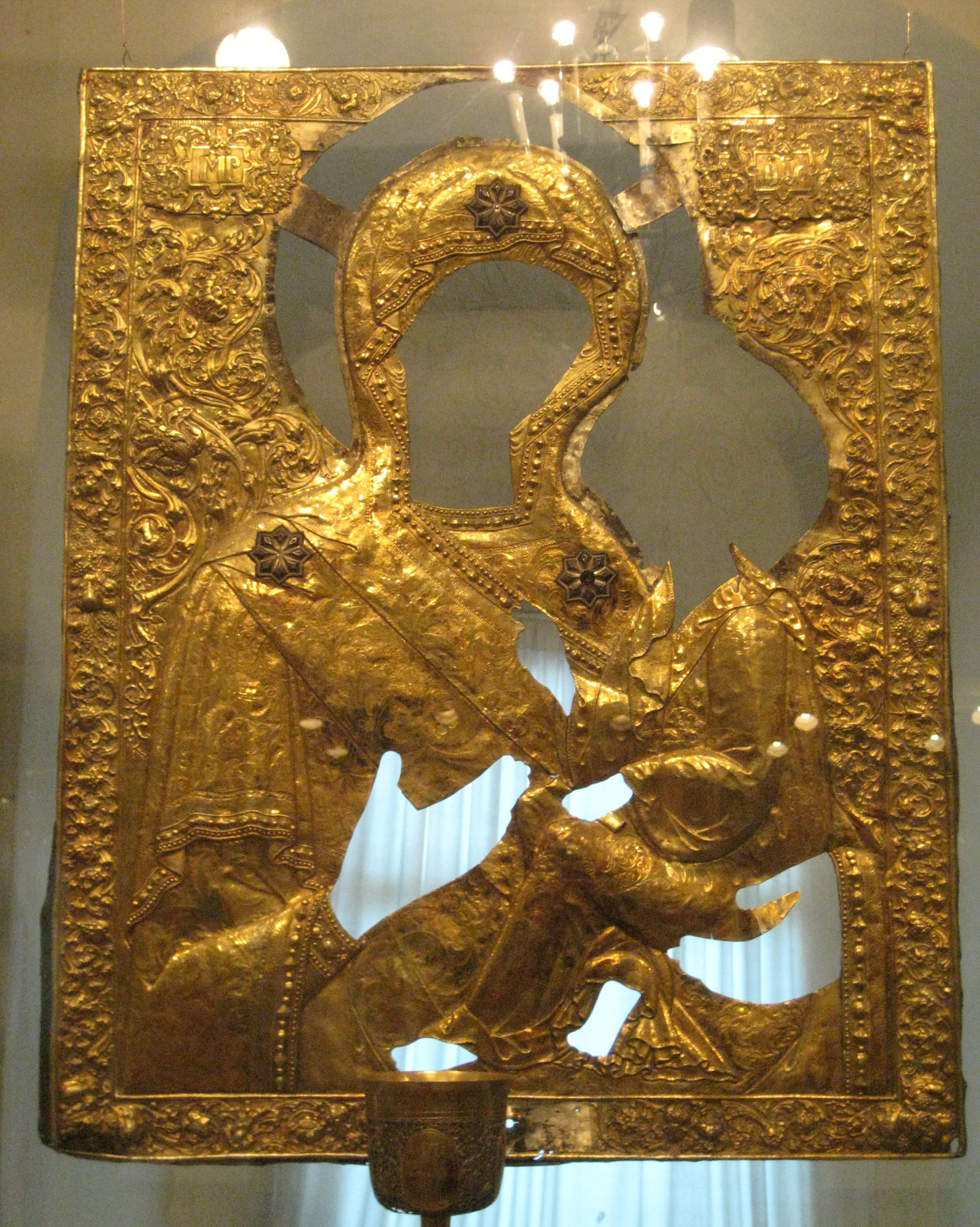
Riza removed from its icon.

A riza (Russian: риза, "vestment," "robe"; Ukrainian: шати, shaty, "vestments") or oklad (оклад, "cover"), sometimes called a "revetment" in English, is a thin metal cover protecting an icon. It is usually made of gilt or silvered metal with repoussé work and is pierced to expose elements of the underlying painting. It is sometimes enameled, filigreed, or set with artificial, semi-precious or even precious stones and pearls. Although the practice of using rizas originated in Byzantine art, the Russian term is often applied to Greek icons; in Greek, the term is επένδυση (romanized: ependysi, "coating"). Icons are described as επάργυρες or επίχρυσες: silver-covered and gold-covered, respectively.

In Eastern Orthodox Christianity, the purpose of a riza is to honor and venerate an icon, and ultimately the figure depicted on it, such as Jesus Christ or a saint. Because candles and lampadas (oil lamps) are burned in front of icons, and incense is used during services, icons can become darkened over time. The riza helps protect the icon. Rizas are often placed over highly-venerated icons, such as the Panagia Ierosolymitissa icon in Jerusalem.

A riza is designed specifically for the icon it is to cover. It leaves open spaces where the face, hands, and feet of the icon's subject can be seen. The halos on rizas are often more elaborate than on the original icons. Rizas for icons of the Theotokos (Mother of God) often have a crown on them. The robes worn by the subjects are often adorned with pearls or jewels. Usually a riza covers the entire surface of the icon except for the face and hands. Especially in older examples, the riza may cover only the halo of the subject and is then called a venets. Sometimes the riza includes a stylized torc or gorget (neck ring), called a tsata in Russian.

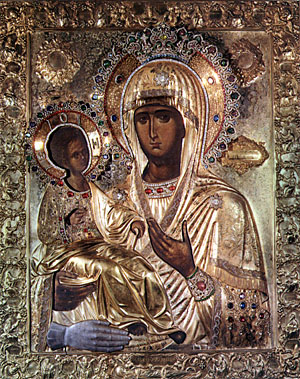
The Trojeručica (three-handed) icon painted by John of Damascus, with a riza laid on top

Some icons, especially late Byzantine ones, were designed with a riza from their first painting. Only the areas not covered by the riza were painted.
