= Daniel Chorny =

Russian icon painter and monk (c. 1350–1430)

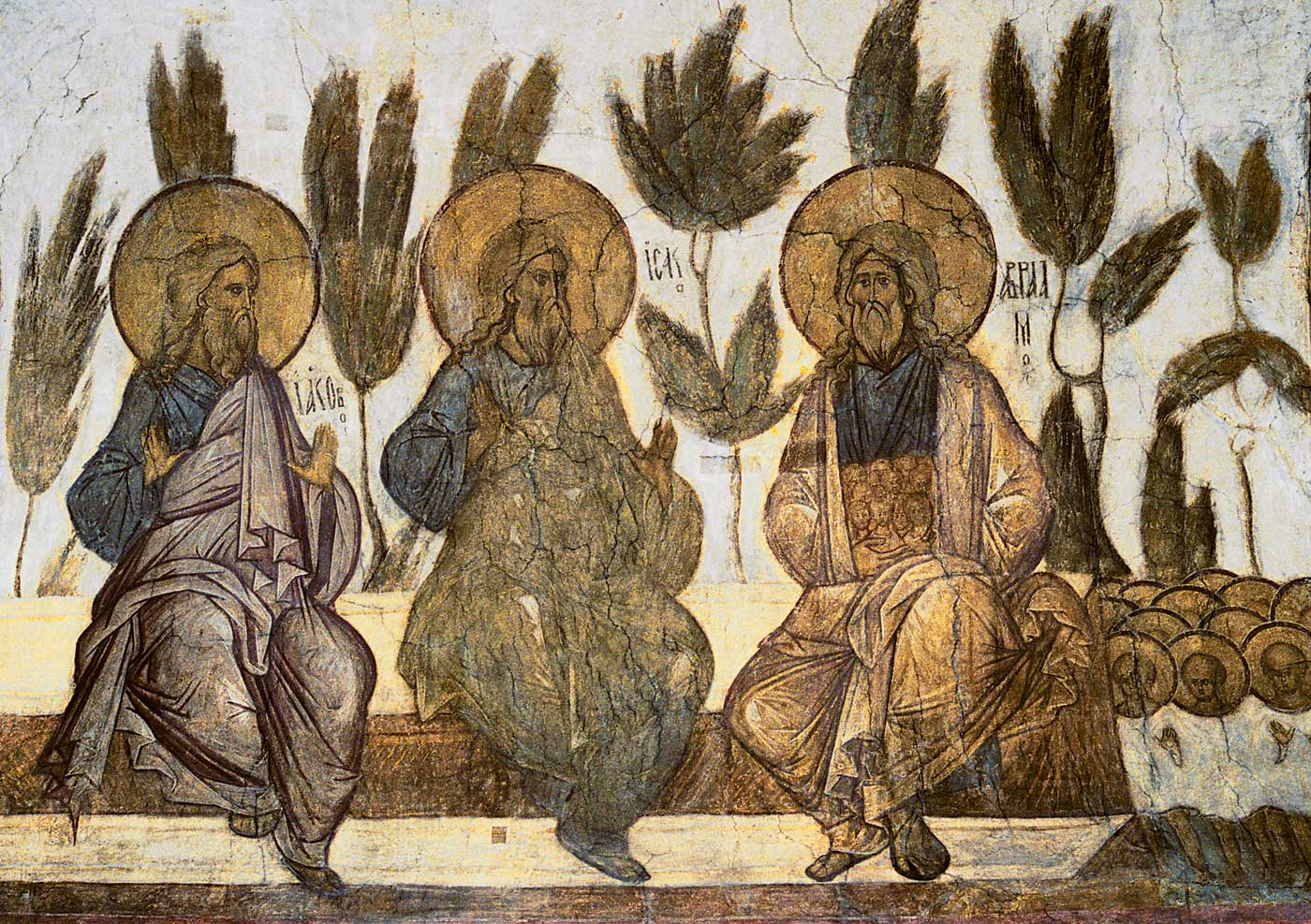
Fresco Bosom of Abraham by Daniel Chorny

Daniel Chorny (Russian: Даниил Чёрный, romanized: Daniil Chyornyy; c. 1350–1430) was a Russian monk and icon painter.

== Career ==
Together with his companion Andrei Rublev and other painters, Chorny worked at the Dormition Cathedral in Vladimir (1408) and the Trinity Cathedral in the Trinity Lavra of St. Sergius (1420s). Some icons for these cathedrals are believed to have been painted by Chorny.

== Works ==
The icons of the Assumption Cathedral are currently displayed at the Tretyakov Gallery in Moscow and the Russian Museum in Saint Petersburg.

== Veneration ==
- 12/13 June – feast day, Synaxis of All of Andronikov Monastery (with Andronicus, Sabbas, Alexander, Abbots of Moscow and Andrei Rublev, the icon painter)
- 6 July – Synaxis of All Saints of Radonezh
- Synaxis of all Saints of Moscow – movable holiday on the Sunday before 26 August (ROC)
