= Culture of Tsarist Russia =

Culture of Russia from the late medieval period to 1917

The culture of Tsarist Russia encompasses the changes in Russian society from the Late Middle Ages up to the proclamation of the Russian Republic in 1917. During this era, shaped by Byzantine influence, the legacy of the Mongol conquest, and the dominance of the Eastern Orthodox Church, Russian culture underwent a transformation from being a state and church-directed affair to one of the most influential on the global stage.

Under the Russian Tsardom, the Russian Church dominated affairs in artistic and intellectual life, with icon painting, ecclesiastical architecture, and Church Slavonic literature constituting the primary cultural forms. During the 17th century, Western influences began to change this, a process that was dramatically accelerated by the Western-oriented Peter the Great. The 19th century saw Russia emerge as a major cultural force in European civilization, with it being the Golden Age of Russian literature, classical music, and art.

Outside the arts, Russian society also saw an expansion in educational ability, with it shifting from being largely Church managed and rare to becoming relatively common and secular. The clash between western and traditional Russian ways of doing provided fodder for much cultural discourse and division in Russian society, as more Western-oriented and anti-Western folks fought in various culture wars over the direction of Russian society. The culture of Tsarist Russia was brought to and end by the Russian Revolution, with its feats and characteristics being absorbed and transformed by the culture of the Soviet Union.

== Arts and literature ==
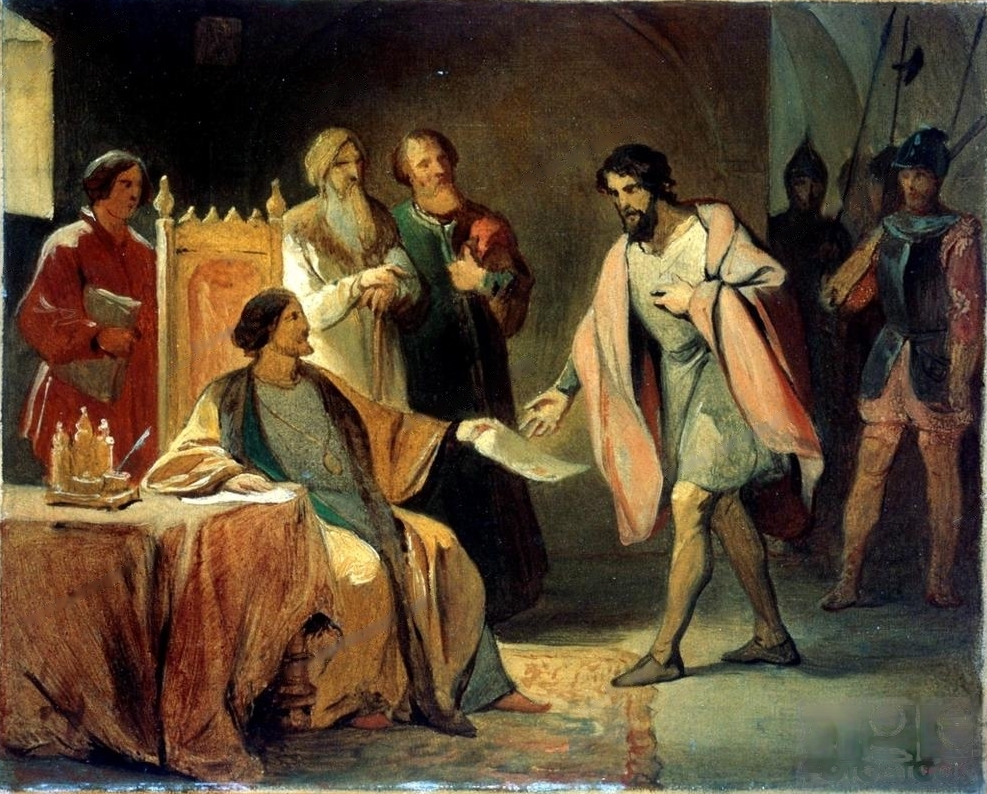
Tsar Ivan III assigns Aristotle Fioravanti an order for coinage in 1479, painting by Pyotr Basin (19th century)

By the 15th century, a distinct form of painting and architecture had emerged in Muscovy, dubbed eponymously the Moscow School. Coming from the gradual integration of various styles native to individual Russian principalities as Muscovy consolidated, it developed throughout the century, being buttressed by the wider Renaissance as Italian artists moved to Russia and spread knowledge of the cultural revolution underway in their homeland. Described as "cooler" and "silvery" compared to the warmer tones of Novgorodian art, the school was exemplified by figures such as Andrei Rublev, Dionisius, and the Italian Aristotele Fioravanti. Works exemplified by the school include the first's icon, The Trinity, and the Dormition Cathedral in the Moscow Kremlin.

Under Ivan the Great and Ivan the Terrible, expansive construction works were undertaken in Moscow in an attempt to make it one of the most splendid cities on Earth, ala the grandeur of Constantinople, who they furthered their claim to by formally adopting the title of tsar, with Ivan the Terrible crowing himself Tsar and establishing the Russian Tsardom in 1547. The Kremlin was significantly expanded and renovated by Ivan the Great, with works such as the Spasskaya Tower, Palace of Facets, and Ivan the Great Bell Tower being built. Saint Basil's Cathedral began construction in 1555 just outside the Kremlin under Ivan the Terrible, and would be completed with its colors in 1683, becoming arguably Russia's most famous landmark and a hallmark of Russian Renaissance architecture.

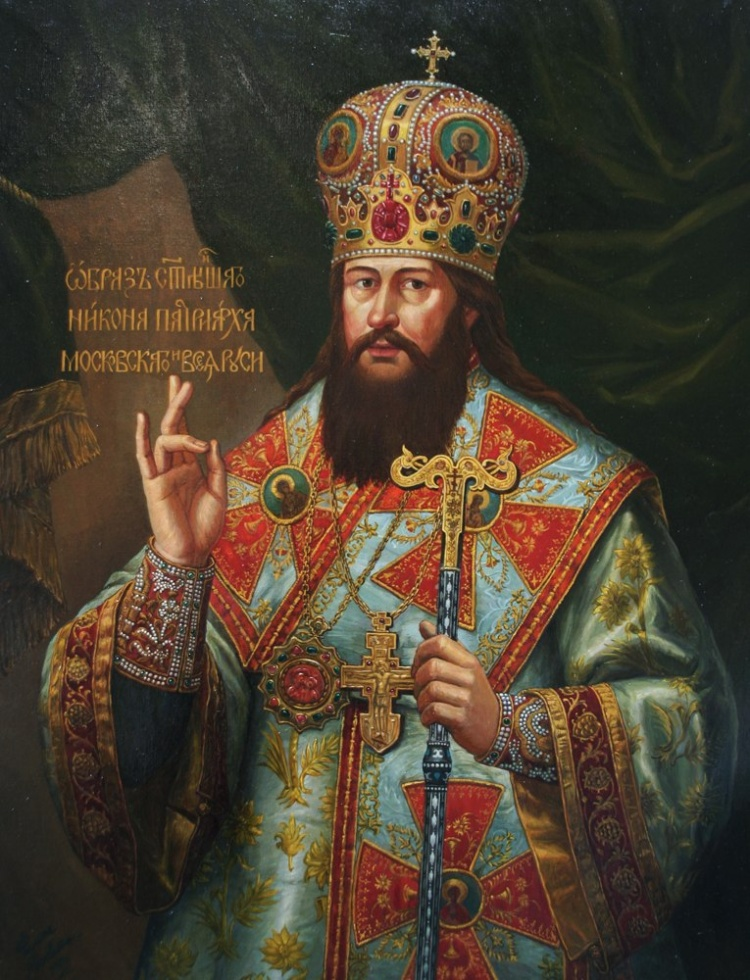
1667 portrait of Patriarch Nikon. His reforms initiated a move towards more westernized icon paintings, though this was rejected by the Old Believers.

Russian architecture and painting remained distinct from that of Western Europe well into the 17th century. Russian art for decades during the early modern era missed out on many of the developments unfolding in the western artistic tradition. The Russians continued the practice of having art largely uphold preexisting artistic traditions, rather than prioritizing personal creativity and ownership of work, as had begun to occur in the west during the Late Middle Ages. This began to shift with Simon Ushakov, a 17th-century icon painter who undertook influences from both Catholic and Protestant Europe. The reforms of Patriarch Nikon to the Russian Orthodox Church in the mid-17th century also saw reforms to icon painting, enabling greater western influence, though the raskol meant that this was rejected by the Old Believers, who continued icon painting in the traditional manner. Before Peter the Great, the last major development in Russian icon painting was the Stroganov school, or the style prominent in the 16th and 17th centuries that thrived under the patronage of the merchant House of Stroganov.

The Petrine reforms saw the importation of greater western influences into Russia, as Peter the Great sought to link Russia to the rest of the continent. As part of this, he moved the capital to Saint Petersburg in 1712, having seized the area from the Swedes in the Great Northern War. Western Baroque influences had already arrived in Tsarist Russia by the end of the 17th century, with the Church of the Intercession at Fili, built by the House of Naryshkin in 1689, ushering in a unique Russian Baroque style. Under Peter the Great, Baroque architecture continued to proliferate inside what was becoming the Russian Empire, under a style that derived more from Dutch and Scandinavian influences. The new capital of Saint Petersburg, which was built by a collection of peasants, slaves, and Swedish POWs, as well as had construction overseen by western men such as the Swiss architect Domenico Trezzini, the new city on the mouth of the Neva in the Gulf of Finland took inspiration in its urban design from Amsterdam and Versailles, and became an epitome of Baroque architecture. Some notable buildings from this are the Saints Peter and Paul Cathedral and Alexander Nevskii Monastery, both of which show marked departures from earlier Russian ecclesiastic architecture, as well as the original new primary imperial palace, the Peterhof, all designed by Trezzini. He also designed the Winter Palace in an originally modest form; over the next few decades, it would be renovated and expanded to become the main imperial palace and an icon of the city and Tsarist autocracy. Western influence would continue under Catherine the Great and Alexander I, who both helped import Neoclassism and the Empire style to Russia.

The lubok, or a sort of popular print depicting common narratives and simplistic graphics, garnered prominence in the 17th century, and remained common for the rest of the state's history. As western influence increased, Russian illustration became more westernized as well. The Russian Academy of Arts was founded in 1757 to increase the prominence of Russian artists on the global stage. Russian painting from the 18th century onwards took influences from and embraced Baroque, Neoclassicism, Romanticism, and Realism.

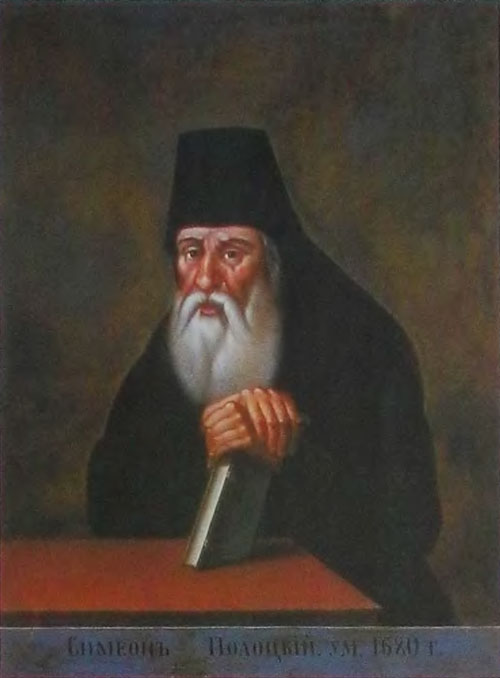
Symeon of Polotsk

In the 14th century, South Slavic clerks revised Church Slavonic to align more with the original Greek texts. This revised Church Slavonic became the literary language of Muscovite Russia. The Bulgarian-born Metropolitan of Kiev, Cyprian, helped make Moscow the new center of Russian culture by writing, translating texts, and aligning Russian religious practice with those of the Byzantines. The fall of Constantinople and subsequent claim to the Roman legacy by Moscow helped initiate a world of literature justifying said claims, such as Nestor Iskander's Tale on the Taking of Tsargrad in the late 15th century, as well as the The Tale of the Princes of Vladimir, authored in the early 16th century by Dmitry Gerasimov, Pachomius the Serb, or possibly someone else. 16th century Russian literature was largely dominated by state-control, with the written word being used to reinforce Tsarist supremacy; following the Time of Troubles around the turn of the 17th century however, control floundered as the instability weakened central authority. This shift began with men like Avraamy Palitsyn, who was known for his complex characters and story arcs. Western influence began creeping in in the late 17th century, as Tsar Alexis sought to import Baroque writing to his court and as members from the Kiev Academy brough with them Polish-influenced texts to Russia. Men like the Belarusian Symeon of Polotsk, as well as Demetrius of Rostov are all examples of Baroque writers from this era.

In the 18th century, Russian literature was influenced by the Petrine reforms and the broader Enlightenment raging across Europe. Early writers such as Antiochus Kantemir, Alexander Sumarokov, and Mikhail Lomonosov, defined Russian literature for much of the 18th century, often extolling Peter the Great's legacy as a tribute to lifting Russia out of its perceived backwardness. Under Catherine the Great, literature took a more controversial and political tone as the Age of Revolution kicked in; the author Alexander Radishchev regularly lauded the French Revolution and illustrated the brutal realities of Russian serfdom, prompting Catherine to force him into Siberian exile and destroy much of his work. The 19th century is known as the Golden Age of Russian literature, and featured great men such as Fyodor Dostoevsky, Leo Tolstoy, Fyodor Tyutchev, Vladimir Odoyevsky, and Konstantin Batyushkov. Many of these fellows wrote for the mid-19th century Russian magazine Sovremennik.

Pyotr Ilyich Tchaikovsky, one of the most acclaimed and famous Russian composers

Classical music came to Russia under the Russian Empire, with secular and religious folks song predominating during the Tsardom era. Russian classical music seriously took off in the 19th century, as new composers combined Russian folk with western influenced traditions. A group dubbed the Mighty Handful, consisting of César Cui, Alexander Borodin, Modest Mussorgsky, Nikolai Rimsky-Korsakov, and Mily Balakirev held large sway over Russian music between 1856 and 1870. They were responsible for works such as Scheherazade, Boris Godunov, and The Snow Maiden. They were often influenced by the emerging Russian operatic tradition, itself undergoing a golden age under men such as Stepan Davydov, Alexander Dargomyzhsky, and Anton Rubinstein. The year 1859 saw the founding of the Russian Musical Society (RMS), often presented as the rival of the Mighty Handful. The RMS' most famous member, and arguably the most famous Russian composer in history, was Pyotr Ilyich Tchaikovsky, who produced works such as Swan Lake, The Sleeping Beauty, The Nutcracker, and 1812 Overture.

In the Belle Époque, as realism and modernism took hold in Russia and as anti-Tsarist sentiment began to mount, the Russian government attempted to crack down on Russian artists, often through the state-run Bureau of Censorship. Despite this, architecture, painting, music, and literature continued to flourish, often containing serious themes of social critique. The Peredvizhniki were a group of Russian painters who protested the restrictions of the Imperial Academy of Arts and left to form a realist collective active during the fin de siècle. The group consisted of men such as Ivan Kramskoi, Vasily Polenov, and Ilya Repin. On the musical front, Russian music was dominated by figures such as Feodor Chaliapin, Alexander Scriabin, and Igor Stravinsky. Throughout the 19th century, eclecticist architecture, often of a revivalist sense and incorporating Byzantine architecture, became common, and the decades preceding World War I saw the rise of Art Nouveau and Neoclassical Revival. The Silver Age of Russian literature consisted of the final developments of Russian literature during the Tsarist era, seeing the rise of Russian Symbolism and an influx of writers of peasant origin following the emancipation of the serfs. Following the fall of the Russian Empire in 1917, the new Soviet Union subsumed the developments of Russian culture under the Tsars, but transformed it to meet their strict Communist, anti-religious, anti-capitalist, and anti-monarchical ideology, often using even more state control to enforce it.

=== Galleries ===
==== Architecture ====
Selected works of Tsarist era Russian architecture

Dormition Cathedral, Moscow (1479)

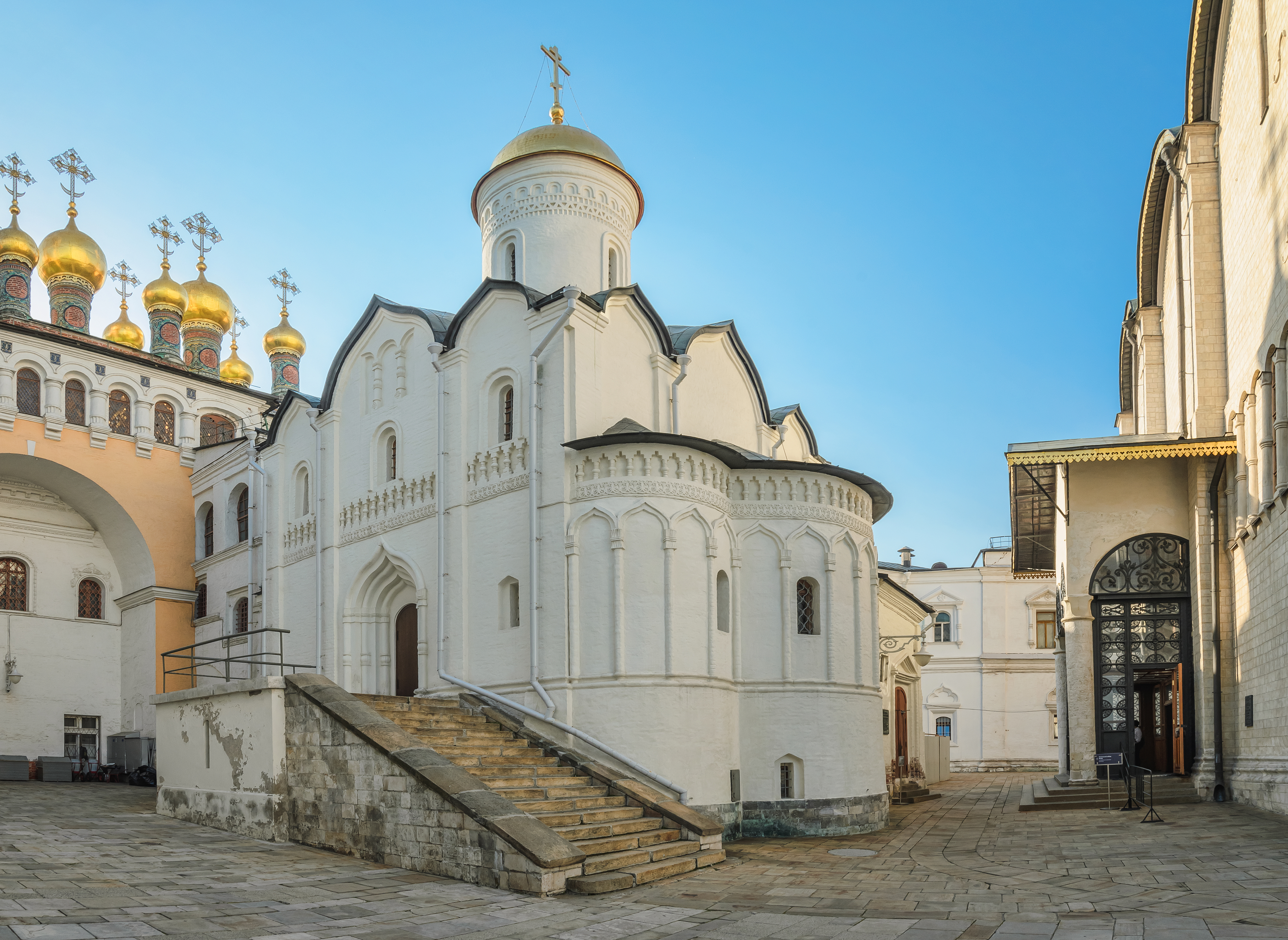
Church of the Deposition of the Robe (1485)

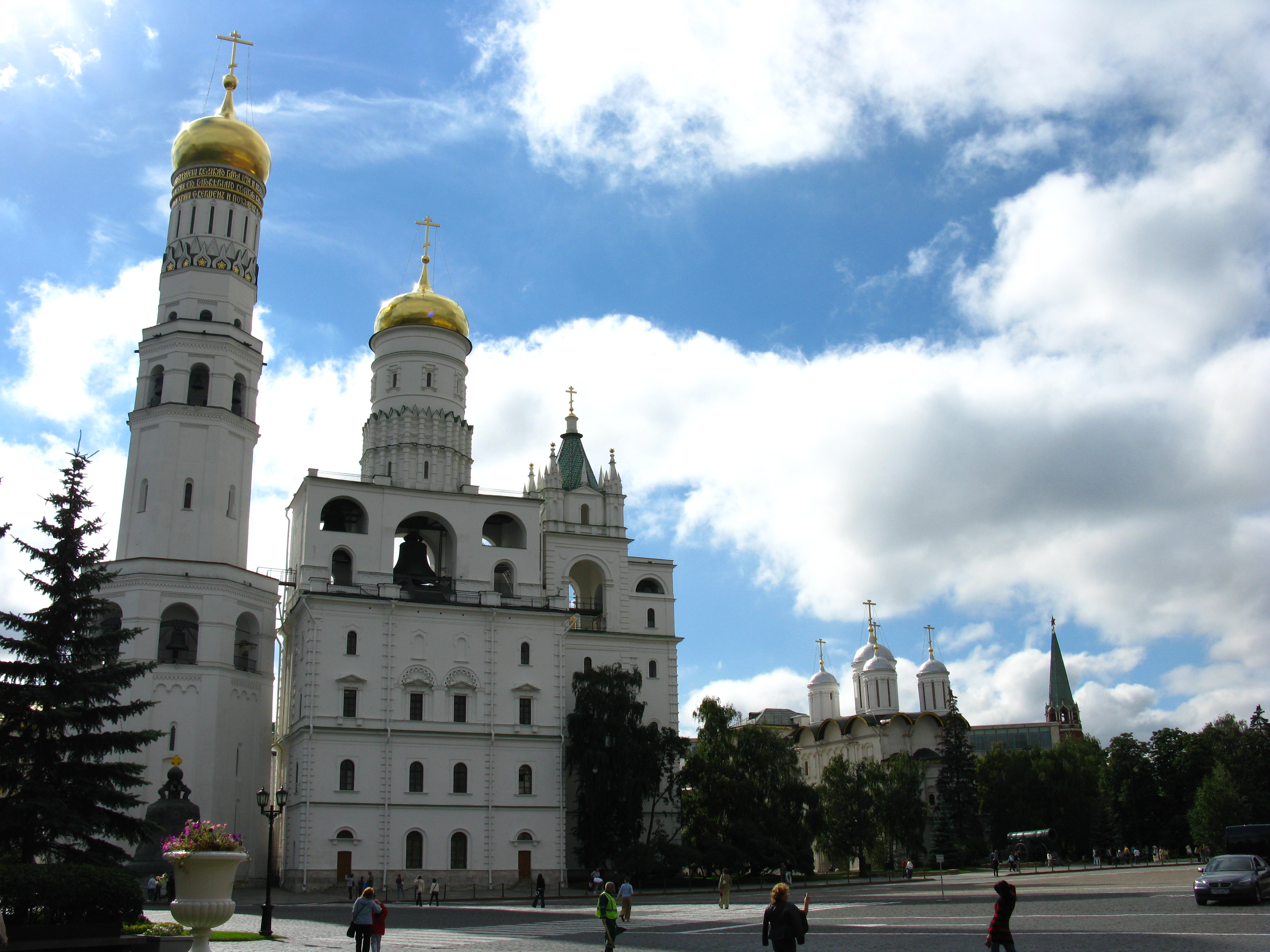
Ivan the Great Bell Tower (1508)

Spasskaya Tower (1491) and Saint Basil's Cathedral (1561 [completed with colors in 1683])

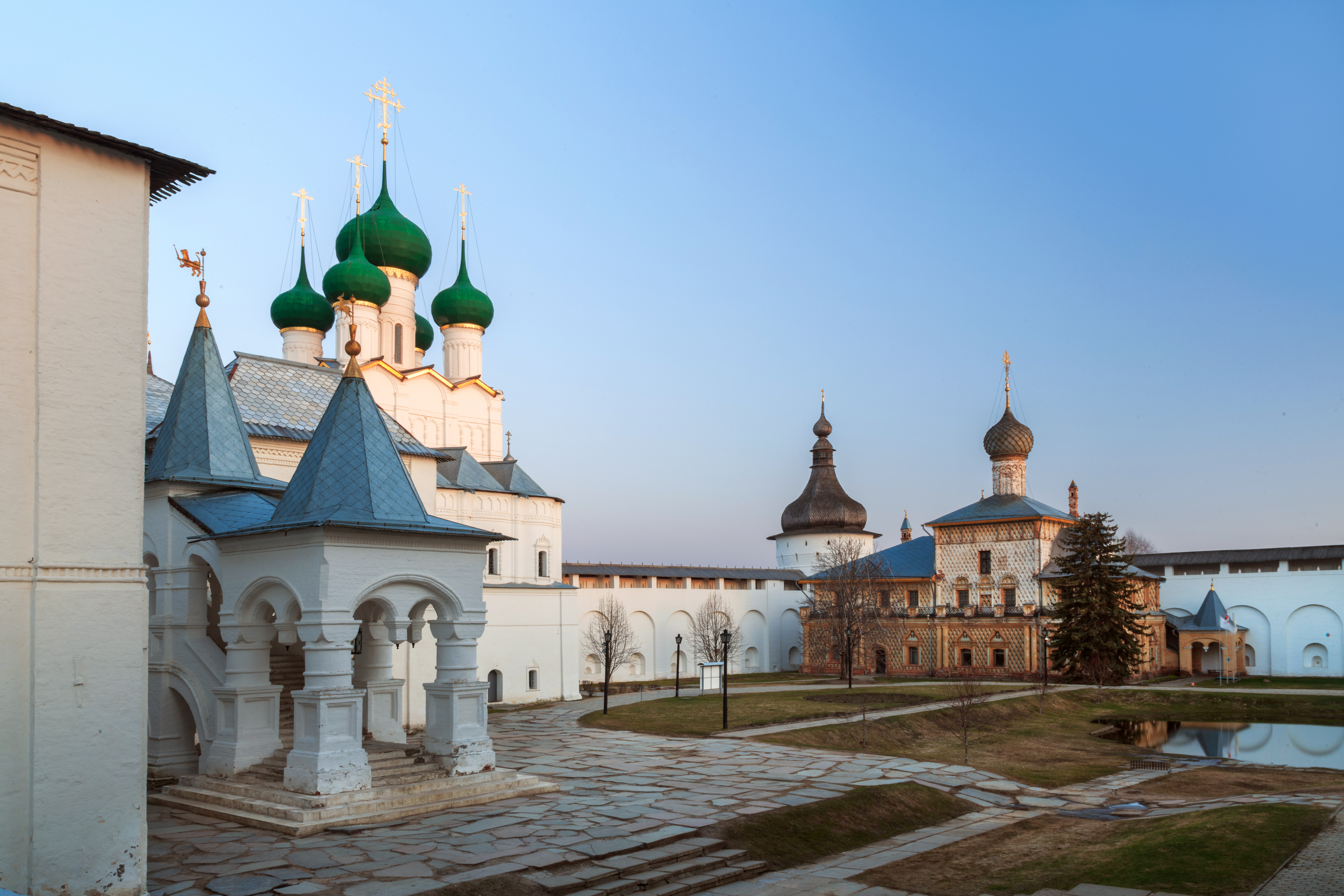
Rostov Kremlin (16th-17th centuries)

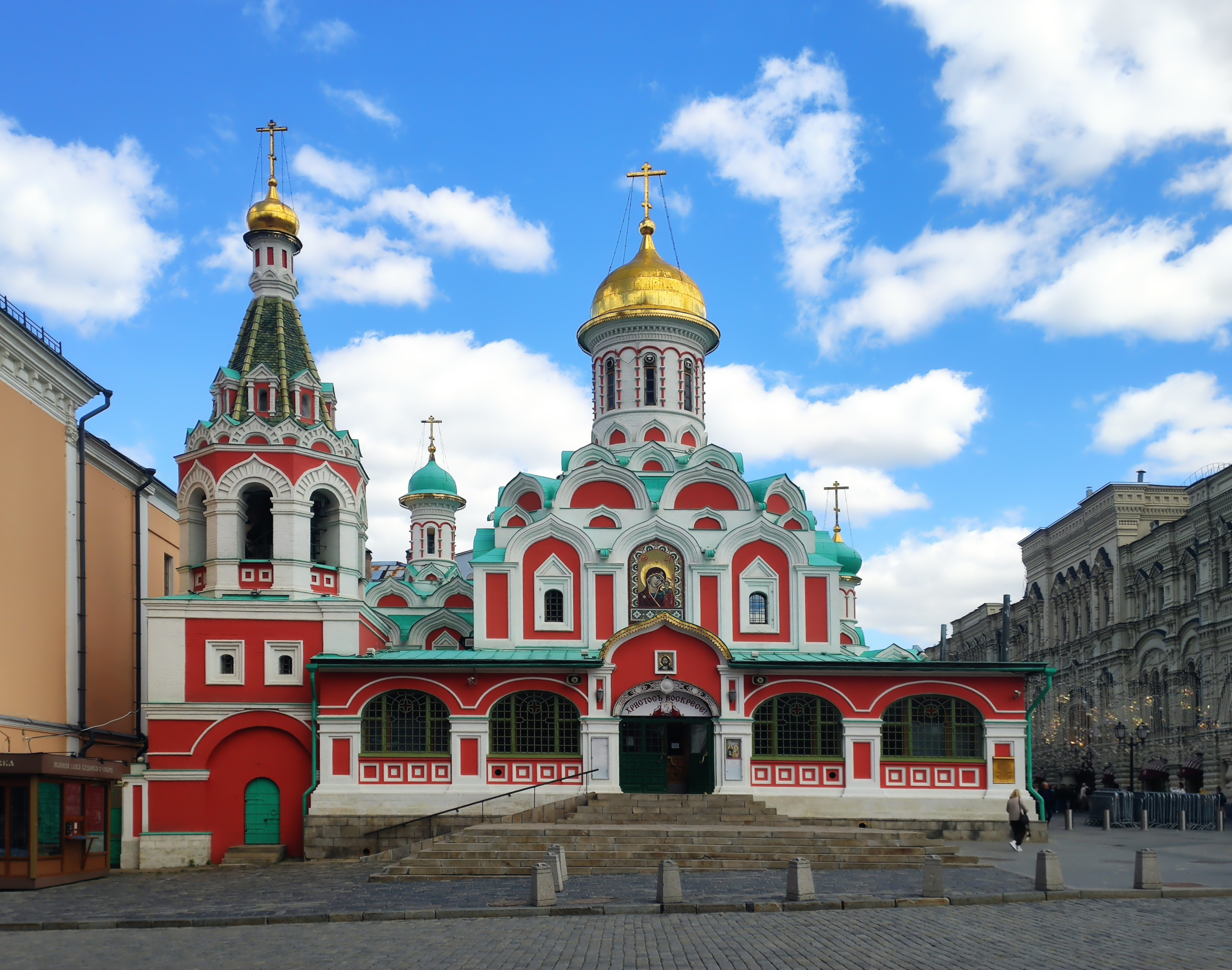
Kazan Cathedral, Moscow (originally constructed in 1625, destroyed by the Soviets under the orders of Joseph Stalin in 1936, reconstructed in 1993)

New Jerusalem Monastery (1656)

Church of the Intercession at Fili (1694)

Saints Peter and Paul Cathedral, Saint Petersburg (1712)

Alexander Nevsky Lavra (1713)

Oranienbaum (1727)

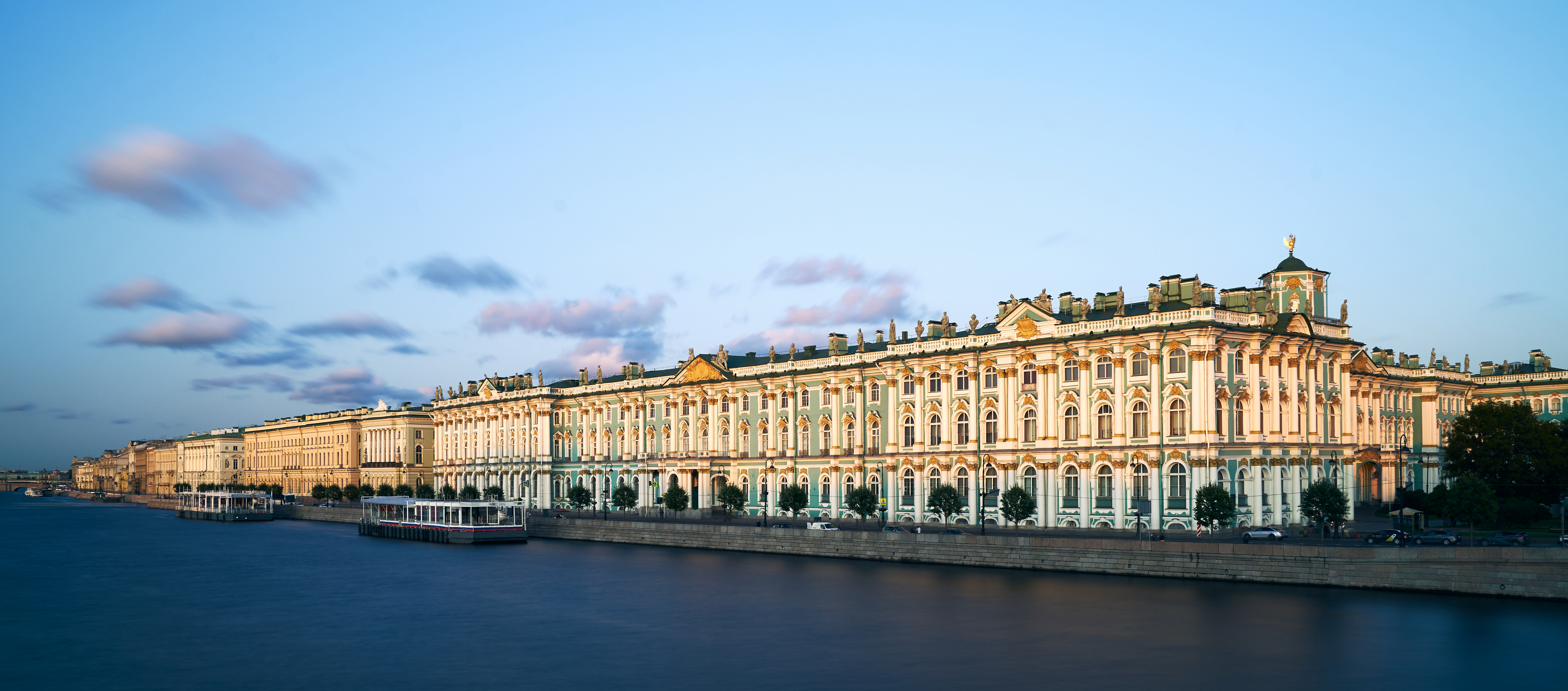
Hermitage Museum complex (18th century), including the Winter Palace (originally constructed in 1711, built in current form in 1762)

Main Admiralty Building (built initially in 1706, rebuilt in current form in 1823)

Saint Isaac's Cathedral (1858)

New Michael Palace (1862)

State Historical Museum (1872)

Eliseyev Emporium (1903)

Singer House (1904)

Moscow Yaroslavsky railway station (originally built in 1904)

Cathedral of Saints Peter and Paul, Petergof (1905)

Church of the Savior on Blood (1907)

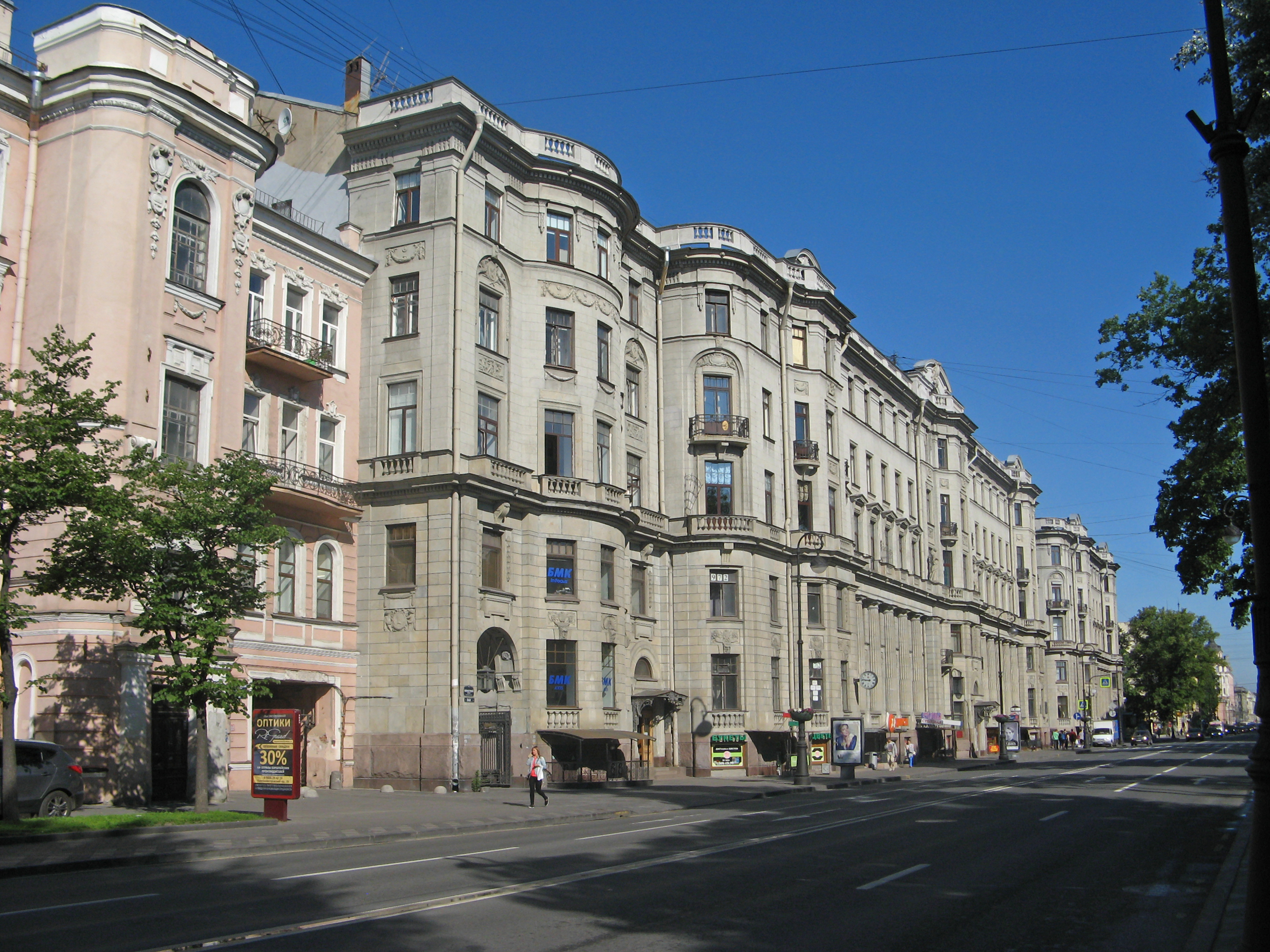
Benois House (1911)

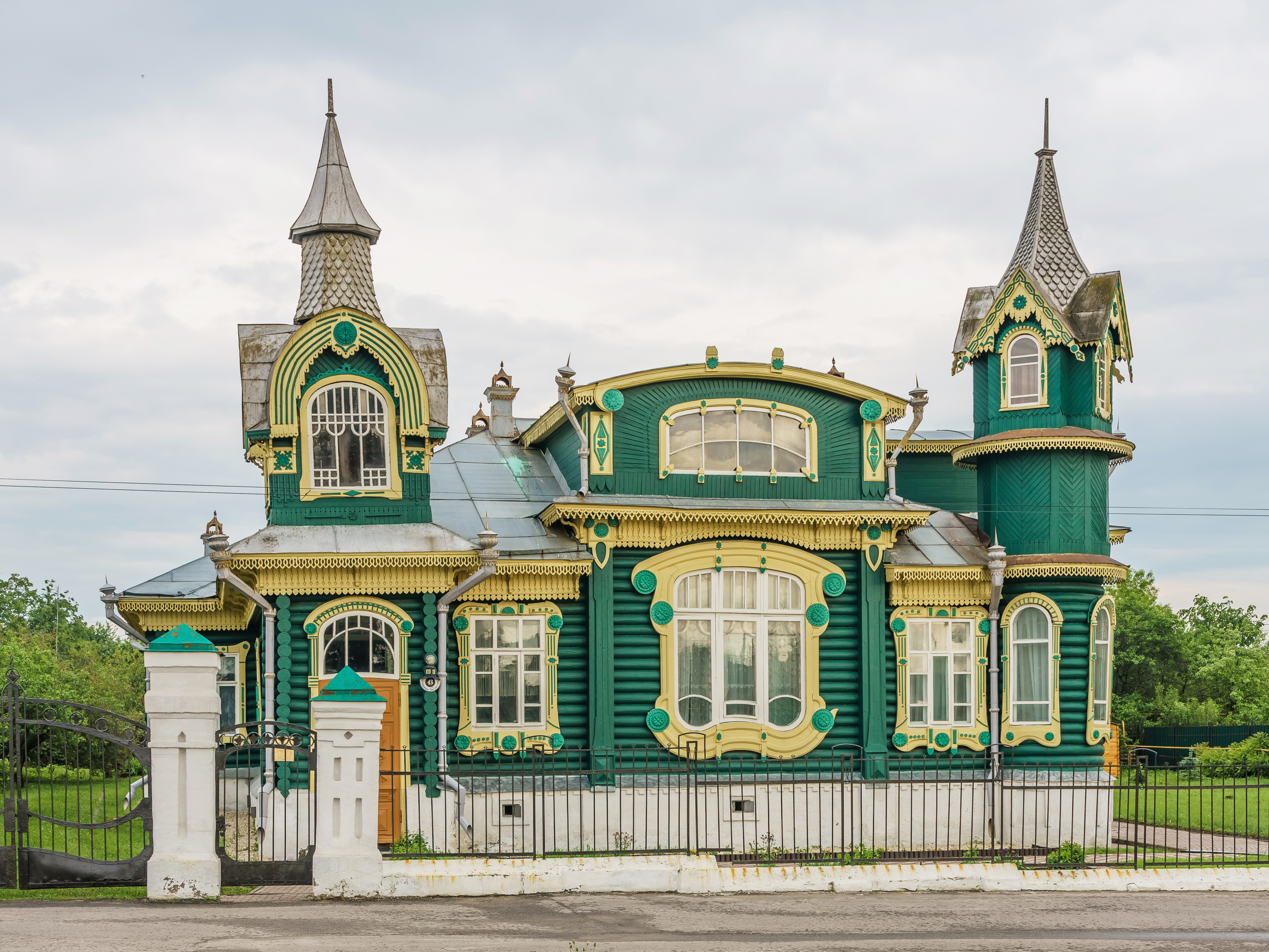
Wood carved Art Nouveau building, Gorokhovets, Vladimir Oblast

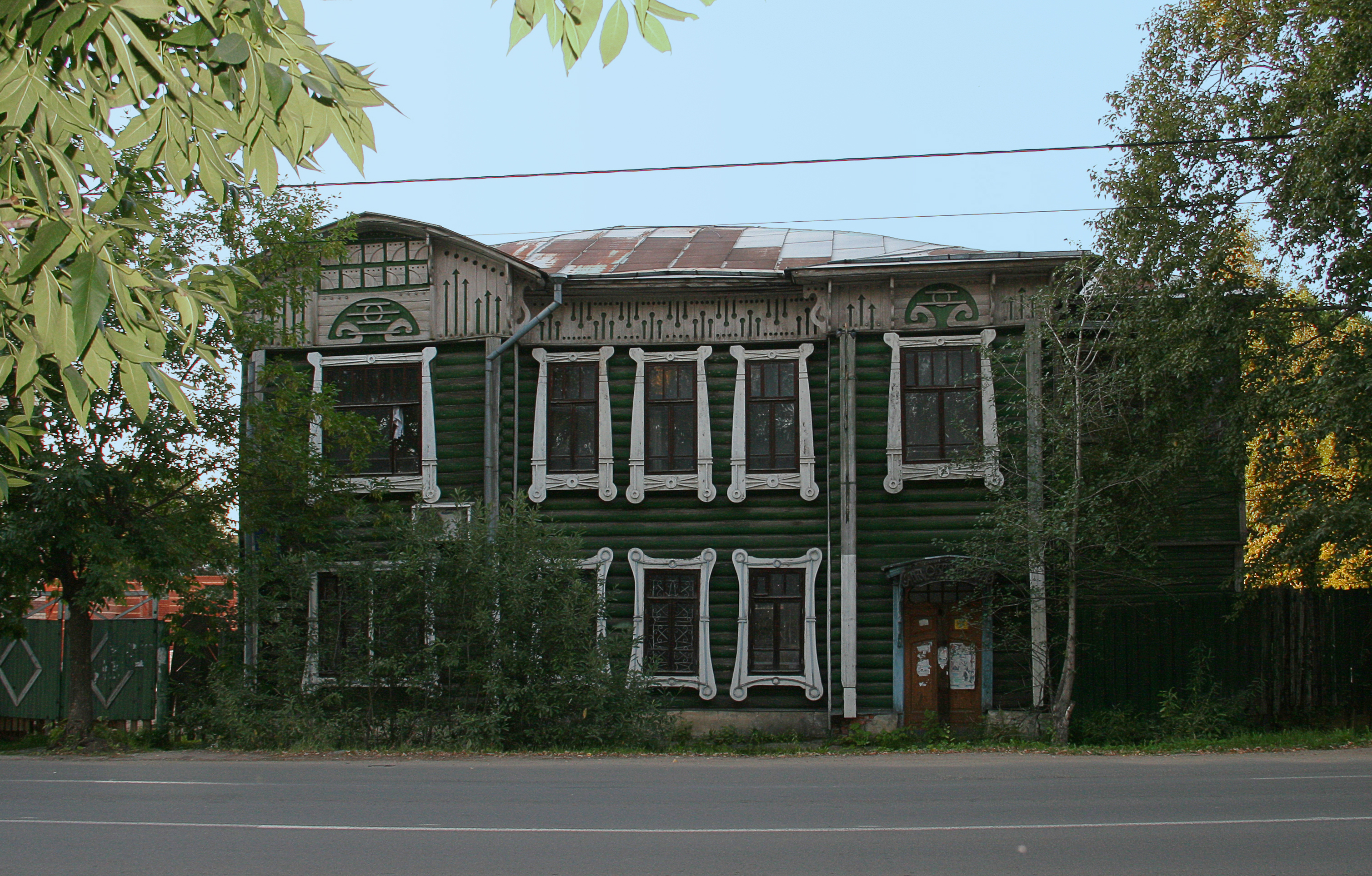
Wood carved Art Nouveau building, Rostov, Yaroslavl Oblast

Saint Sophia Cathedral, Harbin, China (1932). Harbin had a large Russian population, especially White émigrés.

==== Music ====
Selected works of Tsarist era Russian music

"The Song of the Volga Boatmen", a traditional Russian folk song collected by Mily Balakirev in 1866. Performance by Feodor Koenemann in 1928.

Contemporary rendition of "The Song of the Volga Boatmen" by Kevin Macleod

Elvira's aria from Le faucon, by Dmitry Bortniansky (performed by Oksana Petrykova)

"Flight of the Bumblebee", by Nikolai Rimsky-Korsakov. Performed by the US Army Band.

"The Old Castle" from Pictures at an Exhibition, by Modest Mussorgsky. Performed by David Hernando Vitores.

"March" from Prince Igor, by Alexander Borodin. 1913 performance by the Berlin State Opera.

Chopin Suite, Op. 11 – Mazurka, by Mily Balakirev. Performed by the Singapore Symphony Orchestra.

1812 Overture, Pyotr Ilyich Tchaikovsky. Performed by the US Marine Band.

Swan Lake Op.20 - Act II, Tchaikovsky.

Swan Lake Op.20 No.13. Tchaikovsky.

Waltz of the Flowers, from Tchaikovsky's The Nutcracker. By US Army Band.

Dance of the Sugar Plum Fairy from The Nutcracker, Tchaikovsky

Russian Dance from The Nutcracker, by Tchaikovsky. Conducted by Philip Milman and funded by jschlatt and Ludwig Ahgren.

==== Painting ====
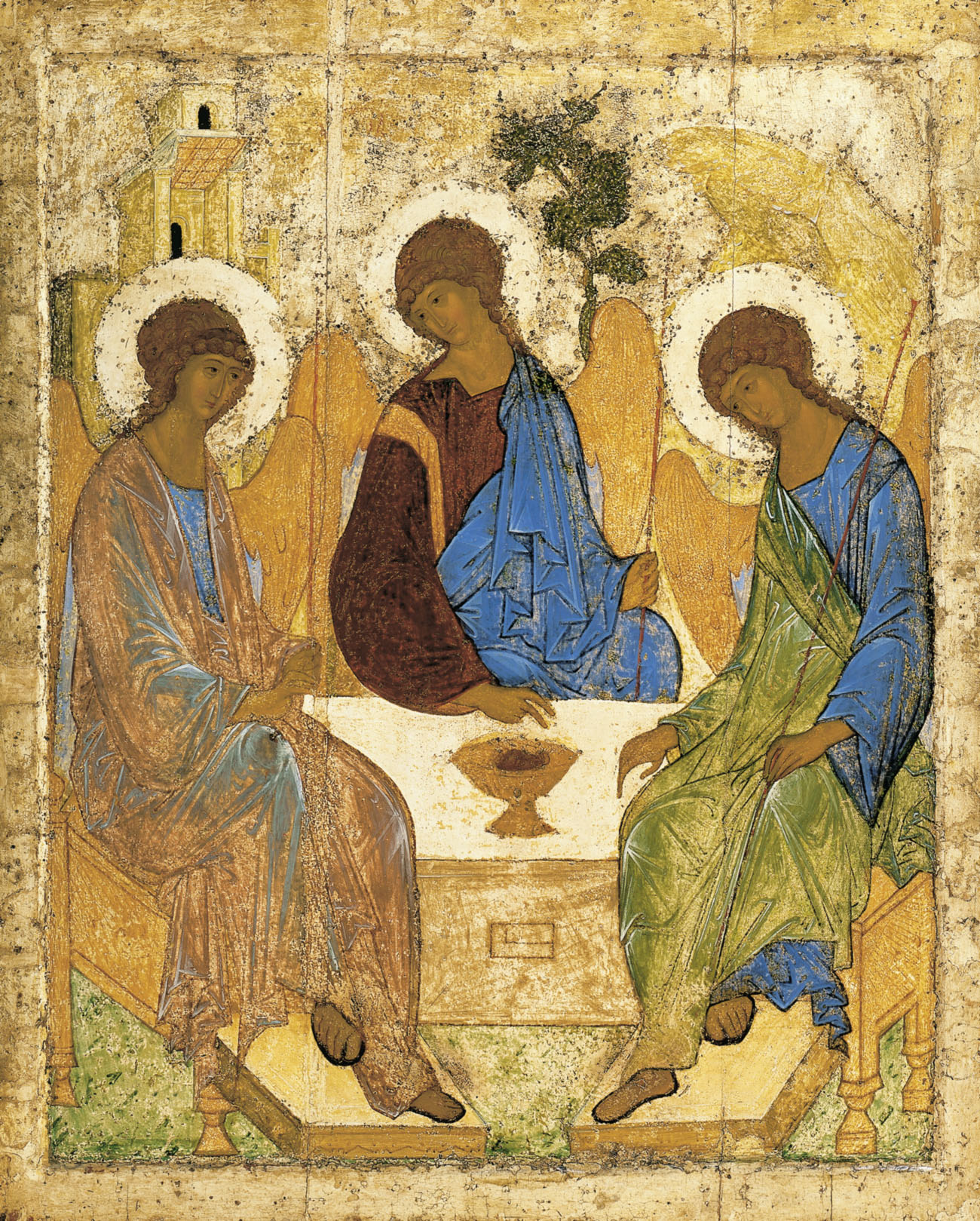
Trinity, Andrei Rublev (early 15th century).

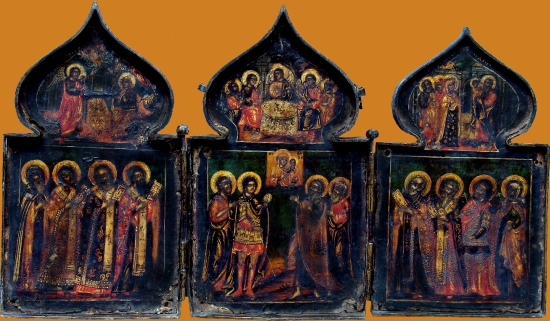
Triptych with the images of the "Annunciation", "Trinity" and "Presentation" (end of 17th century)

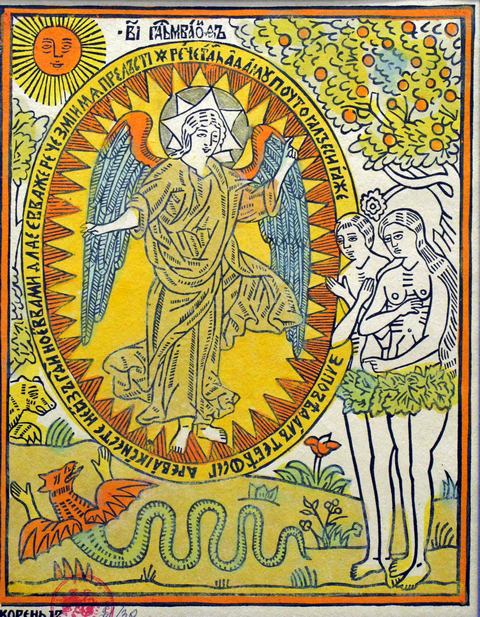
Koren Picture-Bible (1692–1696). Lubok

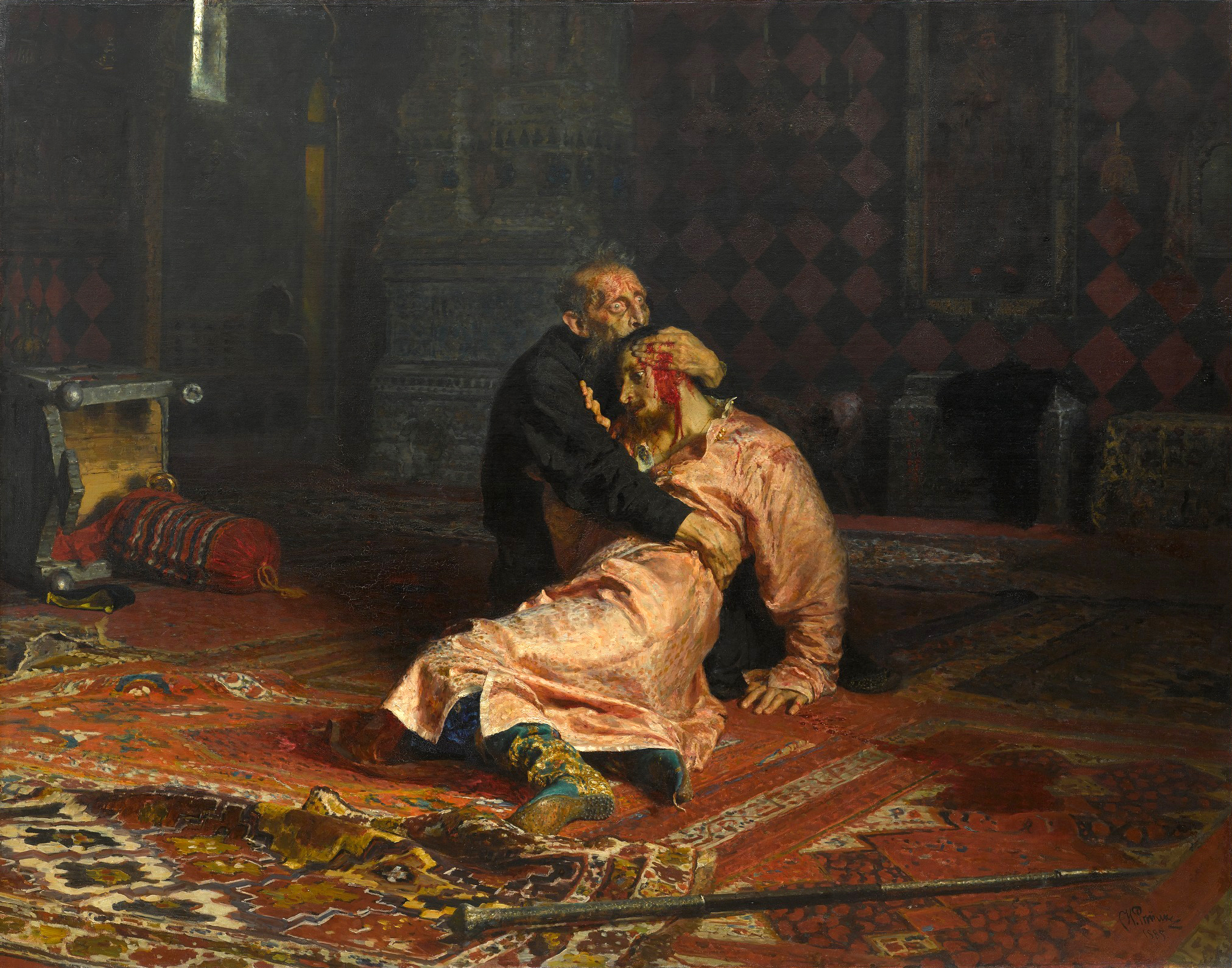
Ivan the Terrible and His Son Ivan, Ilya Repin, 1885

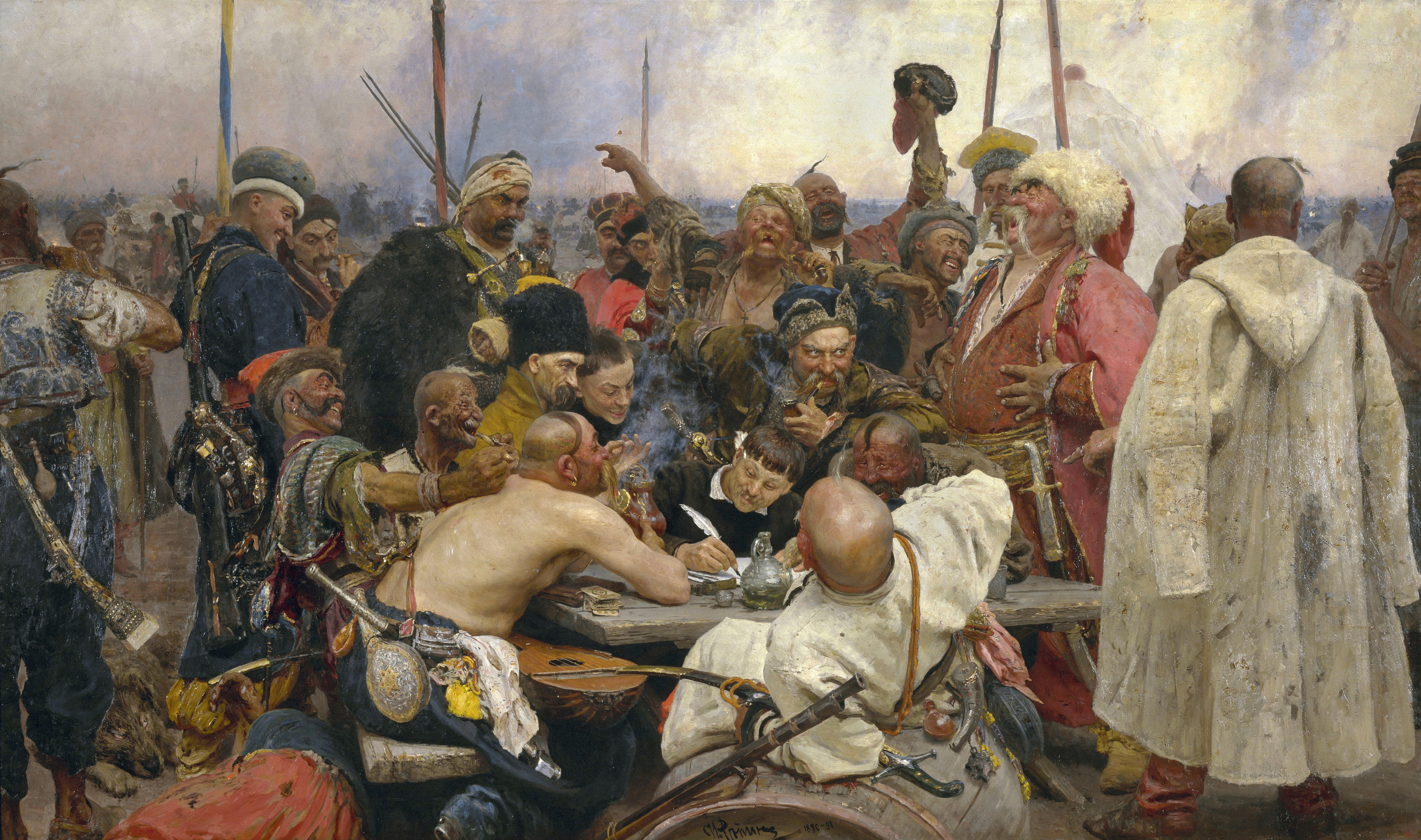
Reply of the Zaporozhian Cossacks, Ilya Repin, 1891

== Education ==
The Zaikonospassky Monastery, where the Slavic Greek Latin Academy used to be located.

Education in Tsarist Russia was of limited access to the majority of its population for most of its history. The Tsarist state prioritized training a coherent administrative and military class to maintain, defend, and expand itself, but was weary of literacy's widespread politically destabilizing effects. Expansions and liberalization of education were followed by periods of contraction; nonetheless, the arc of the period was one of gradual expansion.

In Muscovy, education was almost entirely ecclesiastical, with the Church controlling literacy, which principally existed at the time to serve the Church. Parish priests taught reading and writing to a small minority of boys, usually those prepping for a career in the clergy, using the Psalter and Book of Hours as primary texts. The quality of this education varied from region to region. The first major development was the Slavic Greek Latin Academy of Moscow, established in 1687 under Tsarevna Sophia Alekseyevna. Initially directed by Greek scholars, it was Russia's first institution of higher education, and eponymously offered instruction in Greek, Latin, and Slavonic, as well as rhetoric, philosophy, and theology. It mainly sought to train clergy and correct theological errors, playing a role in the contemporary Schism of the Russian Church, but also educated a generation of intellectuals and officials.

Peter the Great sought to implement a series of educational reforms, which were amongst the most consequential of his entire westernization program. Before him, formal schooling was a privilege of the few, and literacy was low, even for contemporary European standards. Technical, scientific, and secular learning were virtually absent. His acute awareness of this and need of technically trained men led to significant educational reforms under his reign. He opened the Moscow School of Mathematics and Navigation in 1701, followed by the Saint Petersburg Naval Institute in 1715. He also established basic mathematical and technical educational institutes known as the tsifirnie shkoly, or cipher/arithmetic schools, in 1714. Most lasting of all was the Academy of Sciences, established in Saint Petersburg in 1724, which became the center of Russian scientific life for the next century. Under his reign, elite education in Russian was secularized, with western languages (German, Dutch, French) being introduced.

The 18th century saw the consolidation and expansion of his institutions, accompanied with a shift away from militaro-technical education to a more broader humanist education. In 1755, Moscow University was established under Tsarina Elizabeth, the first university in Russia proper, (Note: The earlier Kiev-Mohyla Academy in Ukraine predated it, but it was established under the PLC) which was the preeminent Russian educational institution during the imperial period. The associated Moscow Gymnasium, established alongside it, was the first secular secondary school in Russia. Catherine the Great attempted to create a broader educational network, with her 1786 Statute on Public Schools establishing a two-tiered system of main schools in provincial capitals and minor schools in district towns, derived from contemporary Austrian educational reforms.

The 19th century was characterized by dramatic strides in Russian education that were nonetheless juxtaposed against concerns that it was being used for political radicalism. Under Alexander I, an initial period of educational improvement began, with six new universities - Warsaw, Kazan, Kharkov, Vilinus, Dorpat, and Saint Petersburg - being founded. Much autonomy was granted to academic staff, making this the most liberal era of Russian higher education before its final years. However, in the age of the French Revolution, state weariness over this state of affairs was maximizing, which was intensified following the Decembrist revolt in 1825. Nicholas I's conservative temperament resulted in a sustained assault in higher education, with university autonomy and cirricula being severely curtailed. Sergei Uvarov, the head of the imperial Ministry of Education, explicitly framed Russian educational policy as a tool for inculating correct political and religious values instead of independent thought. At one point, philosophy was banned as a subject, and student numbers were capped at 300 per university following the Revolutions of 1848.

Under Alexander II, another period of liberalization began, with the University Charter of 1863 restoring much of the academic autonomy that had been lost and removing the student caps. Secondary education expanded under his tenure as well. His successor, Alexander III, once again reverse course, with the 1884 University charter terminating elected governance, placing universities under direct ministerial control, upped fees as an explicit attempt to limit university access to reliably conservative classes, and stricter supervison of university life. In 1887, the education minister, Ivan Delyanov, effectively banned the lower classes from secondary education.

Zemstvo school in Sumy, Ukraine

Despite this, the 19th century saw a universal revolution in Russian education just due to the fact that the peasantry was receiving any sort of formal education at all. The Eastern Orthodox Church operated an extensive elementary school network throughout the country via parish schools, which provided reading, writing, arithmetic, and religious knowledge. After the serfs were liberated in 1861, zemstvo schools became common, with generally secular and better educational standards than the parish schools. The tension between zemstvo and parish schools became a proxy for the broader culture war between the more liberal and conservative elements of Russian society; intelligentsia of the former sought to utilize the zemstvos to push their agenda, leading to state intervention to protect the primacy of the parish schools. Nevertheless, they both contributed to a rise in literacy amongst the Russian people, with 21% being literate according to the 1897 census. While still low compared to the rest of Europe, it was still a marked increase from before when the literacy amongst rural populations was virtually absent, and in certain areas such as the Baltics and Finland literacy was around 90%. On a similar note, technical schools, such as the Medical-Surgical Academy in Saint Petersburg, the Institute of the Corps of Engineers of Ways of Communication, the Moscow Technical School, and the Technological Institute of Saint Petersburg, continued to be founded and prosper.

Radical politics continued to simmer in the educational apparatus, with the Going to the People of the 1870s, where young Russian students left for the countryside to work amongst the peasantry to raise their political consciousness, being one such manifestation of this. Clamping down upon this was a key priority of the Tsarist state, with many students being exiled, expelled, and imprisoned; this did nothing but create a steady supply of educated, politically sophisticated youths with no career prospects who were even more radicalized, as recognized by contemporary governmental officials such as Sergey Witte. After the 1905 revolution, educational opportunities were expanded dramatically, with Russia having around 10 million children in elementary schools, 130 thousands in secondary institutions, and 35 thousand in university by 1914, with 127 thousand in secondary education overall. World War I disrupted education significantly, and much of the work would be picked up by the Soviet Union through their mass literacy campaign.

== Women ==
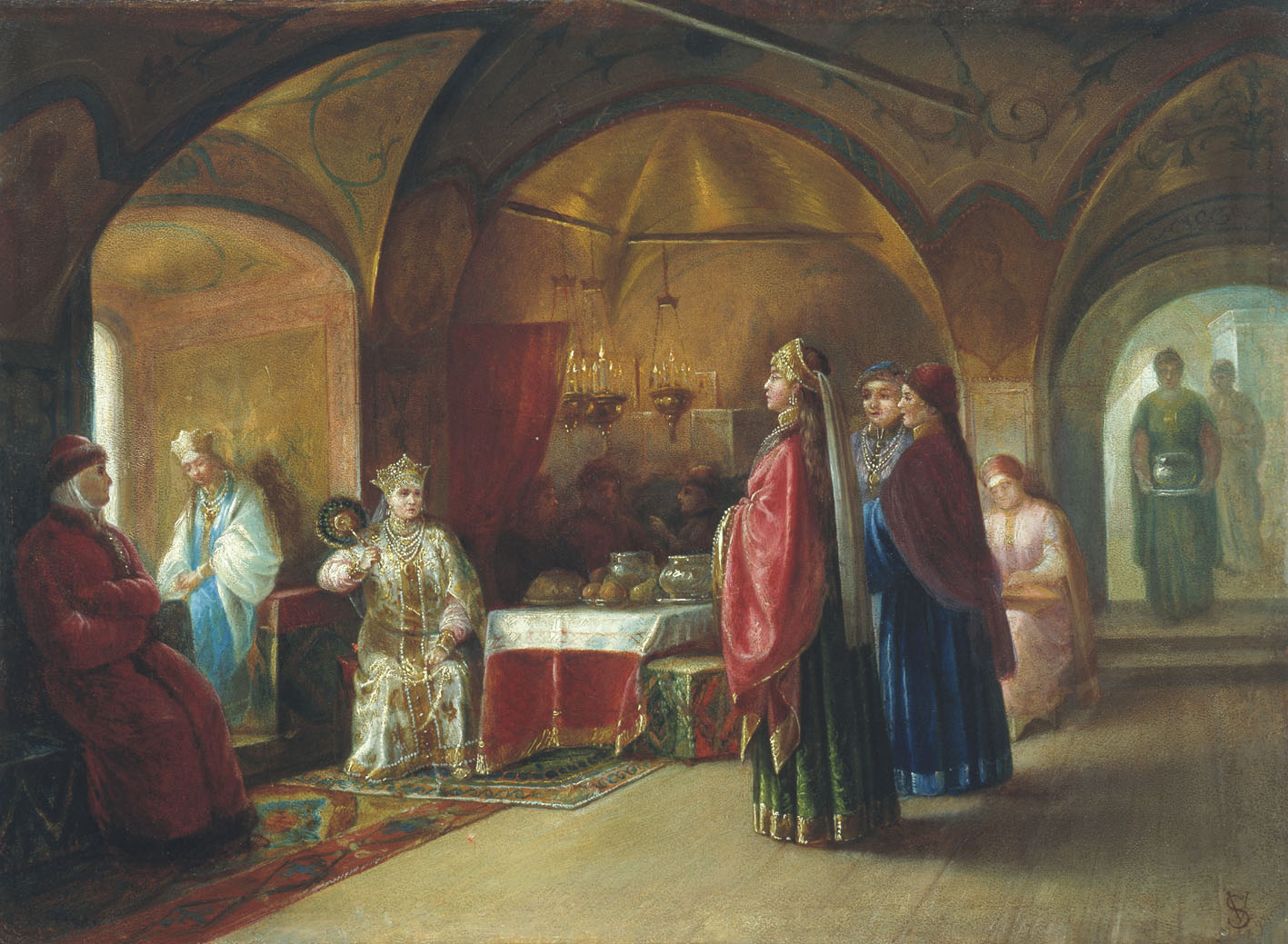
The terem of tsarevnas, painting by Mikhail Petrovich Klodt, 1878

Women in Tsarist Russia faced a series of interlocking customary, economic, legal, and religious frameworks that varied via class. The foundation of the legal framework governing female lives was built on Eastern Orthodox canon law and secular civil law that was largely codified with the Sobornoye Ulozheniye of 1649. Under both, women were subject to a principle of legal subordination; for unmarried women, via her father and for married women, via her husband. Marriage itself was governed by the Eastern Orthodox Church for Eastern Orthodox Christians, with civil marriage or provisions for divorce outside ecclesiastical courts not existing until the Bolshevik takeover.

During the Tsardom era, the seclusion of women became common practice amongst the imperial and boyar families, being placed in terems, or often cloistered apartments or chambers frequently only connected to where the men lived via an outdoor passageway. The women's quarters of the Tsar's palace were particularly elaborate and were equipped with a separate courtyard, dining room, and children's apartments, as well as a large group of maidservants, wet nurses, nannies, and ladies in waiting. Daughters were often brought up solely in the terem, isolated in accordance with traditionalist Eastern Orthodox teachings regarding virginity, and rarely leaving the place until marriage. Terems were as much a political thing as they were a cultural one; as in Islamic and Near Eastern societies, the veiling of women enabled greater control over a woman's marriage choices, which often had immense political and economic implications.

Women in Russia at the time had superior property rights to those of their Western European counterparts, and also managed their own dowries. Noblewomen in particular could and did manage estates, engage in commercial transactions, and conduct legal proceedings in their own names when circumstances permitted. High-class women could also divorce much more easily then their lower class counterparts, as they held the wealth and connections to navigate the convoluted ecclesiastical bureaucracy; amongst commoners, the divorce rate was extremely low, even for contemporary European standards.

By the late 17th century, the terem, especially amongst the imperial family, was on its way out, and it was formally abolished by Peter the Great. The Petrine reforms touched women's status in several ways, with noblewomen were mandated to participate in his new western-style social gatherings that he introduced. The most significant change came as part of the broader wave of reform raging throughout Russia in its last six decades. The 1914 reform of familial law, passed by the State Duma, relaxed some of the restrictions placed on women, being the first legal acknowledgement that married women had independent legal personhood.
