= ANB =

Anb, AnB, ANb, or ANB may refer to:

- Anb, a village in Syria
- Alaska Native Brotherhood/Sisterhood, advocacy group for natives of Alaska
- Tomb ANB, an ancient Egyptian burial tomb
- Agoraphobic Nosebleed, an American cybergrind band
- Anniston Metropolitan Airport, Alabama, US (IATA airport code "ANB")
- ANB Futbol, a Canadian soccer team
- ANB (glider), a 1983 Soviet single-seat aircraft
- Alex Neal-Bullen, an Australian rules footballer
- American National Biography, a biographical encyclopedia
- Agencija za Nacionalnu Bezbjednost (National Security Agency (Montenegro)), Montenegrin intelligence agency
- Avisenes Nyhetsbyrå, a Norwegian press agency
- Amarillo National Bank, the largest bank in Amarillo, Texas
- Assyrian National Broadcasting, an Assyrian television station based in San Jose
- Athletics New Brunswick, the organizing body for athletics in New Brunswick, Canada
- Ambulance New Brunswick, provincial ambulance services in New Brunswick, Canada
- An Adjudicator Nominating Body, who will identify an adjudicator to resolve a construction dispute in the UK
