= Yeruslan Lazarevich =

Russian folk-literature hero

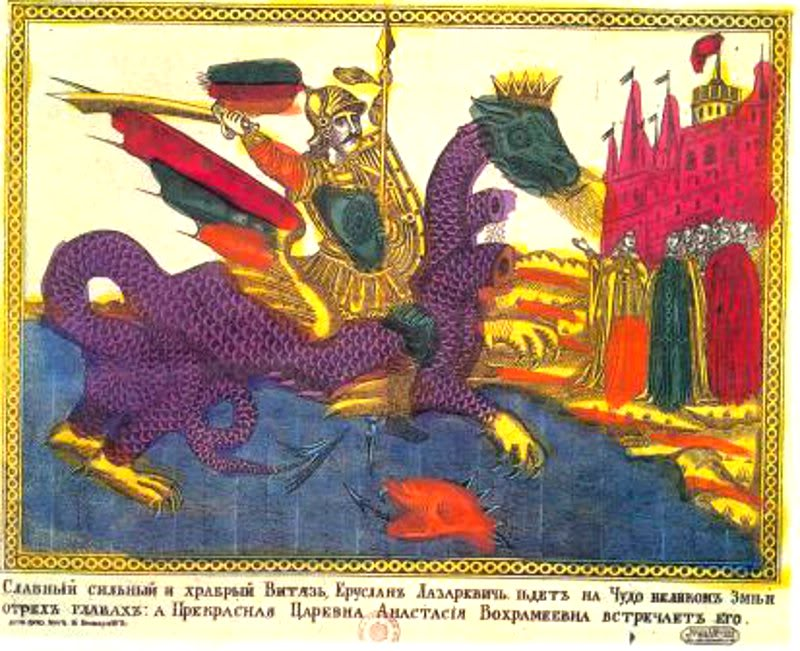
"The Valiant Knight Yeruslan Rescuing Princess Anastasia", an 18th-century lubok

Yeruslan Lazarevich (Russian: Еруслан Лазаревич), also known as Eruslan Lazarevich or, in the Tatar original, Uruslan, is the Russian folk-literature hero of The Tale of Eruslane Lazarevic, which recounts the many military and amorous adventures of a young and beautiful hero. Old Russian readers greatly enjoyed the tale; due to the variety of its content and by appearing frequently in lubok illustrated prints, it spread widely among the people. Its influence is noticeable even on some retelling of tales about Ilya of Murom.

Erusulan, Uruslan and the German form Jeruslan Lasarewitch are some of the variant spellings.

== Origins of the legend ==
One theory (Vladimir Stasov, 1868) is that the legend was an adaptation of the exploits of Rostam, hero of the Persian epic Shahnameh. Possibly this story was introduced by the Tatars. One of the similarities is the combat between father and son, Rustem and Sohrab, although this has parallels worldwide. Another is Rustem's campaign, in Mazandaran for the release of the Persian king Kay Kaus.

The father of Yeruslan (according to the Undolsky manuscript version) is Zalazar, retaining the name of the father of Rustem, Zal-Zar; the King of Persia is Kirkous, altered from Kay Kaus of the Shah Nameh; the horse of Uruslan is Arash, while the horse of Rustem was Rahsh. Uruslan himself can be equated with Rustam, since he was being called Arslan (Lion) in Tatar versions. Between the two above-mentioned episodes, the first of which is the beginning of the second – the tales were ended, to immediately place the other adventures of Uruslan (with little connection in the original versions), such as the meeting with a Russian hero Ivan, the fight with him, then their fraternisation and mutual assistance in the search by Uruslan for Ivan's daughter taken by Theodulus-zmeyya Kandauly Feodulovny; the meeting of Uruslan with beautiful princesses, held by a giant-keeper, Ivashko; the battle with the sea king dragon saving Princess Anastasiya Vahramyeevna, his marriage to Princess of the Sunflower City and so on. These adventures of Uruslan do not have a direct correspondence in the adventures of an Iranian Rustem, but find parallels in the various oriental tales.

The Tale of Eruslane Lazarevich is of considerable interest for the history of fairy tales about Ilya of Murom. On the one hand, on some adventures of the Murom heroes there are the same motives that went into the tale of Eruslane Lazarevic. For example, a meeting of Ilya with Nightingale the Robber, his coming to Kiev and his relationship with Prince Vladimir is reminiscent of Eruslan Lazarevic meeting with Ivashko hero and his arrival to the king of Dalmatia; the meeting of Ilya with Korolevichnoy can be associated with the meeting of Yeruslan with beautiful princesses; then the two knights fight with their sons not known of them, and so on. On the other hand, some epic poems, and especially tales about Ilya of Murom had a cheap popular direct effect in people, which it has in common with the tale of Eruslane Lazarevic.

== Publications ==
The Tale of Eruslane Lazarevich manuscript was published, first by Vukol Undolski and N. S. Tikhonravov, and then by the manuscript Archive of Pogodinskaya, by N. Kostomarov. The text of the cheap popular personal tales was printed by D. A. Rovinsky. Both record tales of the 17th century represented in two editions, of which the edition of the Undolskogo (Undolsky collection) list is considered more valuable, as it has a more logical connection between the separate adventures of the hero, names in it the hero as Sir Uruslan and preserved in greater purity, in some names of other characters.

Russian folklorist Alexander Afanasyev wrote an abridged version of the tale and interpreted the character of the inimical king as a storm deity, probably derived from mythology.

"Yeruslan Lazarevich" is classified under its own type in the East Slavic Folktale Classification (Russian: СУС, romanized: SUS): SUS -650B*, Russian: Еруслан Лазаревич, romanized: Yeruslan Lazarevich, closely placed with other tale types about strong heroes. The East Slavic Classification registers variants from Russian and Belarusian sources.

== Notes ==
In writing this article was incorporates text from the Encyclopædia Britannica Eleventh Edition (1890-1907).
