= ANB (glider) =

ANB-M
- ANB-M

General information
- Type: Glider
- National origin: Soviet Union
- Designer: Peter Almurzin, Nikitin, Bogatov
- Status: Technical drawings available

History
- Introduction date: 1983
- First flight: 1 May 1983

The ANB-M is a Soviet, single-seat, aluminum ultralight glider that was designed by Peter Almurzin (Петра Альмурзина), Nikitin, and Bogatov whose surnames make up the A, N, B in the glider name (Cyrillic:АНБ).

== Design and development ==
The ANB-M first flew on 1 May 1983. The aircraft was designed as a primary glider of aluminum construction and its design team was headed by Peter Almurzin (Петра Альмурзина) in Kuibyshev (Куйбышева) in the Soviet Union. Websites still sell plans for the ANB-M glider as a United States FAR 103 compliant ultralight glider which requires unpowered vehicles to weigh less than 155 lbs (70.3 kg).

== Operational history ==
The ANB-M won first prize at the Soviet Ministry of Aviation Industry SLA-84 competition in 1984 at Koktebel

== Variants ==
ANB-M
Initial version, first flown 1 May 1983, single seat primary glider with an 8.75 meter wingspan.
ANB-I
Developed as a double ANB-M model that was a two place glider that had the occupants separated in parallel by 2.2 meters apart and utilized an 11 meter wingspan with a twin boom tail.

== Specifications ==
Data from PropJet Forums

General characteristics

- Crew: one
- Length: 5.4 m (17 ft 9 in)
- Wingspan: 8.75 m (28 ft 8 in)
- Wing area: 10.5 m^{2} (113 sq ft)
- Aspect ratio: 7.35:1
- Empty weight: 70 kg (154 lb)
- Gross weight: 145 kg (320 lb)

== See also ==
Aircraft of comparable role, configuration, and era

- Sandlin Goat
- US Aviation Super Floater

Related lists

- List of gliders (miscellaneous)
