= Gury Nikitin =

Russian painter

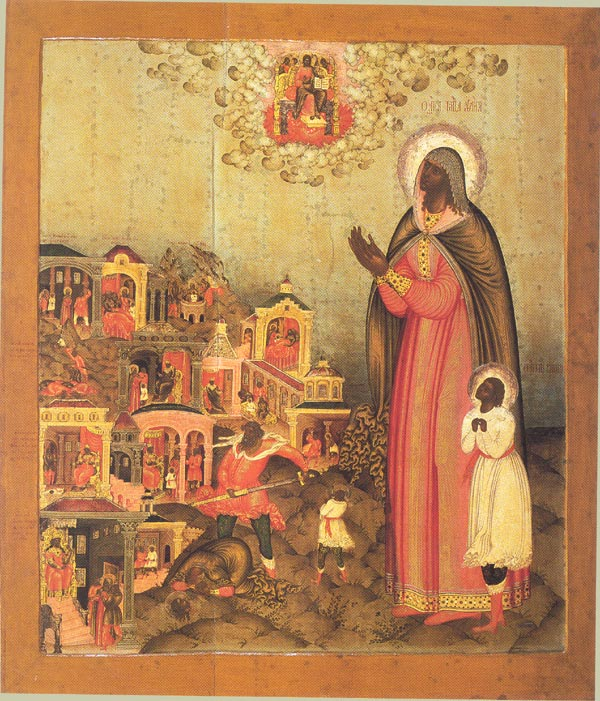
Saint Quiricus and Saint Juliet. c. 1680

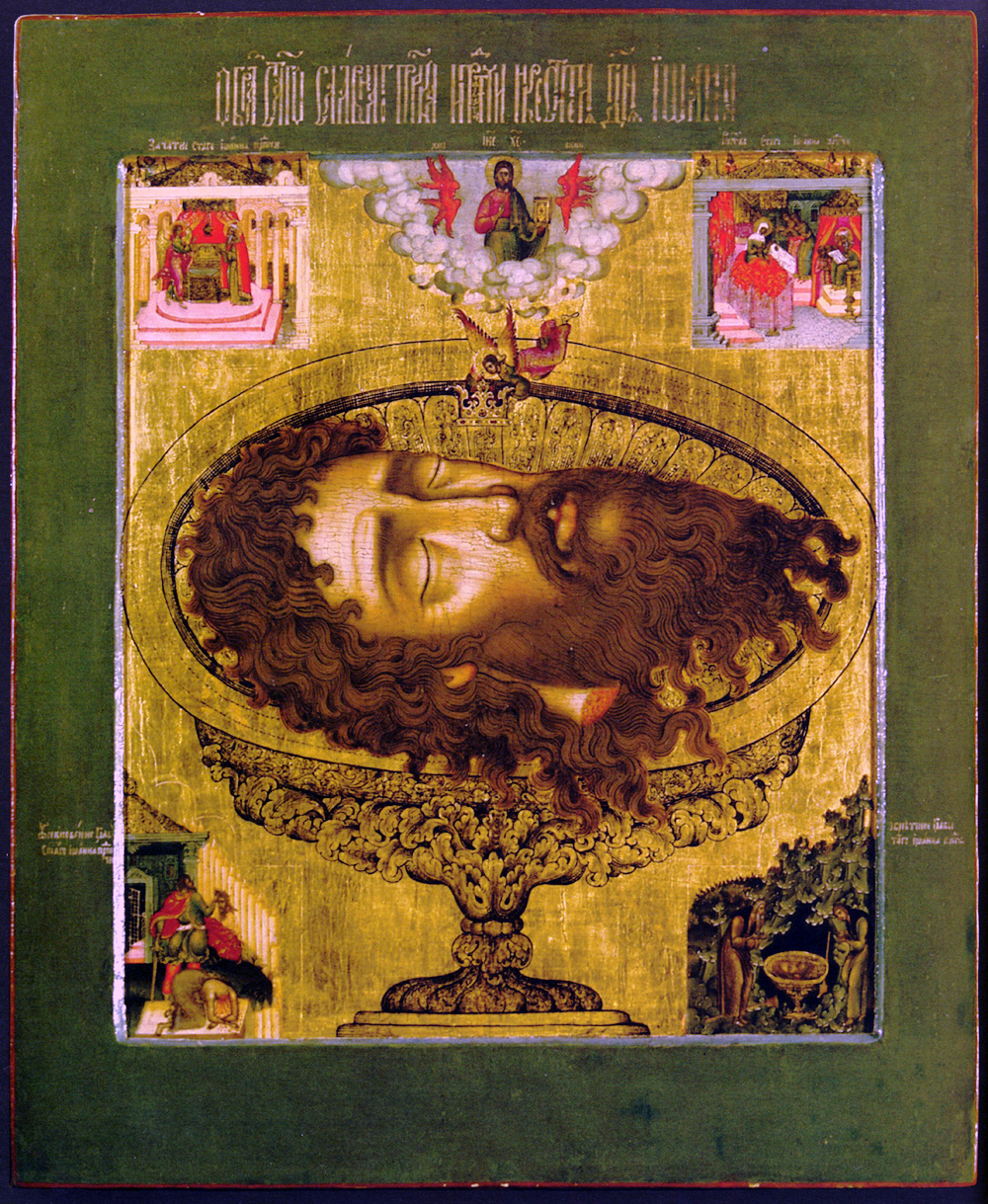
The head of John the Baptist c. 1680

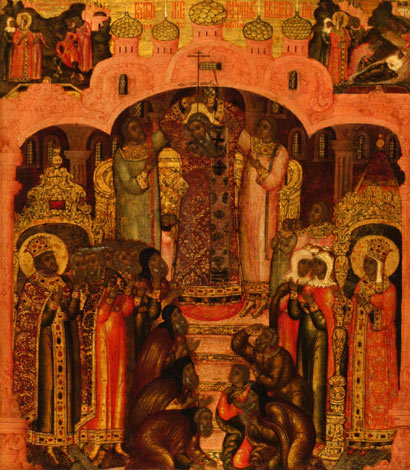
The feast of the Cross c. 1680

Gury Nikitin (Russian: Гурий Никитин; 1620, in Kostroma – 1691, in Kostroma) was a Russian painter and icon painter. He worked principally on wall paintings and frescos, but also produced icons on wood panels and designed engravings. He was head of the Kostroma Brotherhood of Painters, an artists guild, until his death.

== Works ==
In 1653, he may have participated in the decoration of the Moscow Church of the Holy Trinity, Nikitinki. Later churches decorated by the Kostroma Brotherhood, including the Church of Elijah the Prophet in Yaroslavl, the Assumption Cathedral in Rostov, the Holy Savior of St. Yefim Monastery in Suzdal, probably involved Nikitin, however it is very difficult to distinguish his work from that of his associates.

In 1688, he painted several icons on wood panels for the Patriarch of Antioch, Makarius. He also painted military banners for Tsar Alexei and designed the engravings of the Koren Picture-Bible. His work combines biblical themes with carefully observed scenes from life. In his icon painting he adhered to the canon, except in some complex scenes where he borrowed from the iconography of Johannes Piscator's bible.

== See also ==
- List of Russian artists
