= Nikitin =

Nikitin (Russian: Никитин), or Nikitina (feminine; Никитина) is a common Russian surname that derives from the male given name Nikita and literally means Nikita's. It may refer to:

== Artists, musicians, authors ==
- Basil Nikitin (1885–1960), Russian orientalist and diplomat
- Gury Nikitin (1620–1691), Russian icon painter
- Ivan Nikitich Nikitin (c. 1690–1742), Russian painter
- Ivan Savvich Nikitin (1824–1861), Russian poet
- Sergey Nikitin (musician), contemporary Russian composer, singer and bard
- Tatyana Nikitina, contemporary Russian singer and composer (wife of musician Sergey Nikitin)
- Victor Ivanovich Nikitin, Soviet soloist with the Alexandrov Ensemble
- Yevgeny Nikitin (bass-baritone), bass-baritone
- Yuri Nikitin (author) (1939–2025), Russian sci-fi writer
- Sergei Alekseevich Nikitin (b. 1950), Russian sculptor

== Athletes ==
- Andriy Nikitin, Ukrainian football player and manager
- Larisa Nikitina, contemporary Russian heptathlete
- Vera Nikitina, contemporary Soviet hurdling athlete
- Yuri Nikitin (gymnast), Ukrainian trampolinist
- Boris Nikitin, Georgian swimmer
- Nikita Nikitin, Russian ice hockey player
- Sarah Nikitin, Brazilian Archer
- Diana Nikitina, Latvian Figure Skater

== Scientists, engineers and architects ==
- Boris Nikitin (1906–1952), Soviet radiochemist
- Nikolai Nikitin (1907–1973), Soviet structural design and construction engineer
- Vasilii Vasilyevich Nikitin (1901–1955), Soviet aircraft engineer
- Tatiana Nikitina, linguist

== Botanists ==
There are at least five botanists with this surname, shown here followed by their standard author abbreviations :

- Sergei Alekseevich Nikitin (1898–?) S.A.Nikitin
- Sergei Nikolaevic Nikitin (1850–1909) Nikitin
- Vasilii Vasilevich Nikitin (1906–1988) V.V.Nikitin
- Vladimir Alekseevich Nikitin (1906–1974) V.A.Nikitin
- Vladimir V. Nikitin (fl. 1996) Vl.V.Nikitin

== Others ==
- Afanasiy Nikitin (died 1472), a Russian explorer and merchant
- Alexander Nikitin, contemporary Russian environment activist and a dissident Navy officer
- Alexey Petrovich Nikitin, Russian artillery officer of the Napoleonic Wars
- Andrey Grigoryevich Nikitin (general) (1891–1957), Soviet general
- Anfal Nikitin (fl. 1360), Novgorod boyar and ushkuynik
- Basil Nikitin Soviet orientalist and diplomat
- Nikolay Aleksandrovich Nikitin (general), (1900–1984), Soviet general
- Vladilen Nikitin (1936–2021), Russian engineer and politician
- Vladimir Nikitin, multiple people
- Viktor Nikitin (1893–1933), Russian and Serbian pilot, killed in the first disaster of Yugoslav civil aviation
