= Vladimir Nikitin =

Vladimir Nikitin (Russian: Владимир Никитин) may refer to:

- Vladimir Nikitin (runner) (born 1992), Russian distance runner
- Vladimir Nikitin (boxer) (born 1990), Russian boxer
- Vladimir Nikitin (skier) (born 1959), Soviet-Russian cross-country skier
- Vladimir Alekseevich Nikitin (born 1934), Soviet and Russian physicist, professor, laureate of the USSR State Prize (1983)
- Vladimir Konstantinovich Nikitin (1911–1992), Soviet racing driver
- Vladimir Mironovich Nikitin (1905–1979), Russian Orthodox bishop
- Vladimir Nikolaevich Nikitin (1907–1993), Soviet physiologist
- Vladimir Nikolayevich Nikitin (1848–1922), Russian army commander
- Vladimir Nikitin (politician) (born 1948), Russian politician and deputy of the State Duma

== See also ==
- Nikitin
