= List of gliders (miscellaneous) =

This is a list of gliders/sailplanes of the world, (this reference lists all gliders with references, where available) Note: Any aircraft can glide for a short time, but gliders are designed to glide for longer.

This list is of gliders/sailplanes that have limited information available.

== Miscellaneous ==
- Aéroplaneur 1911 glider
- ANB (glider) (Cyrillic:АНБ)
- Aquilla (glider)
- AV 222/H14
- Bacerka
- Bahr (glider)
- Bauart
- Cancarevic
- Caucase du Nord (North Caucasus)
- Chelm School Glider (Latvia)
- Cirulitis (glider)
- Cumulus 5 – Japan
- Daugaviete
- Delfin (glider)
- Delfin M-2
- Delfin M-3
- Delta 1
- Dream (glider)
- Dream (glider)
- Drückspatz II
- Dubno School Glider
- Dzerve
- Elytre
- Erglis
- Gamajun (glider)
- GK 1911 glider
- Grif (glider)
- Gulbene II – Latvia
- Gulbis (glider)
- Hamborger Jung
- Illerfalke
- ILZS
- Jamin 1932 glider
- Janika (glider)
- Jar Ptiza
- Jastreb 54
- Jastreb bis
- Jenni 1931 glider
- Jerav (glider) – Bulgaria (Kranich II copy)
- Joey (glider)
- Jupp-Pitter
- Kaija (glider)
- KANJA Ultra Light Glider
- Kijushu 5
- Kijushu 7
- KL biplane glider
- Koctebel (glider)
- Kokot Pisece
- Kristal (avion)
- Lāčplēsis (glider)
- Lányi Az Ket biplán
- Latvija (glider)
- Le Grolinet
- Lenta (glider)
- Lotnia Feyrala
- Ly Thermikas
- Maikapars
- Mara (glider)
- Mattley Primary
- Meinigen
- Mintava
- Młody Lotnik Glider
- Monk Pegasus
- Mouisset AP-1
- Mulhousia
- Mulliners Aeroplane
- Nameisis (glider)
- Niemcy Bräutigam
- Nippon Tombo
- Okarmusa 1
- Okarmusa 2
- Parsla
- PCF (glider)
- Perth Glider 2
- Philips MK-I
- Philips MK-II
- PIP (glider)
- Praha 1922 glider - Skupina Konstrktér
- Prodam III Hadi
- Prva petoletka Roda
- PW-5 (glider) – 1922
- Renaut Primary
- Robert Aéroplane
- Rowley R-100
- Russell Whisper 2004
- Sailer Liegnitz
- Salka (glider)
- Selija (glider)
- Seshayes P-1
- Sesquiplane Glider
- Sharapov AN Brawler Kudeyar "Desperado"
- Skaubitis
- Skauts
- Skif (glider)
- Skrunda I
- Sloka (glider)
- SM-206
- SM-5 (glider)
- Smith Norbet 1923
- Smolenets (glider) – (Смоленец)
- Sova (motor-glider)
- Staburags (glider)
- STC-CG 1931
- Streifeneder Albatros I
- Suarez 1895 glider
- SUE-1
- Sup 1922 glider
- Sutton Airedale
- SZ-10 Horak
