= Dmitry Rovinsky =

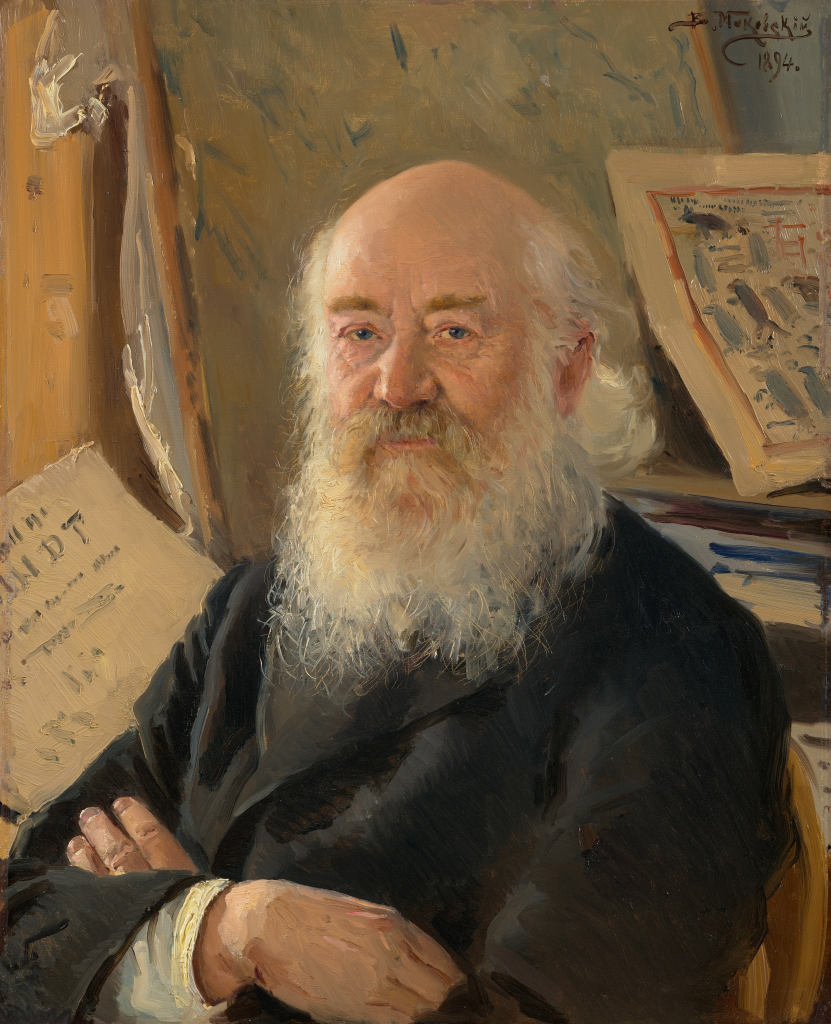
- Portrait by Vladimir Makovsky, 1894; Tretyakov Gallery, Moscow
- Born: August 16, 1824; Moscow
- Died: June 11, 1895 (aged 70); Bad Wildungen
- Citizenship: Russian

Dmitry Aleksandrovich Rovinsky (Russian: Дми́трий Алекса́ндрович Рови́нский; 28 August [O.S. 16 August] 1824 - 23 June 1895) was an art historian and compiler of reference albums on Russian portraits and engravings of the 18th to 19th centuries. He was an honorary member of the Academy of Science and Academy of Arts.

== Biography ==
Dmitry Aleksandrovich Rovinsky was born into the family of a Moscow policeman. After graduating from a law college he started his service in Moscow, taking various legal posts. From 1870 till the end of his life he served as the Senator of the Criminal Cassation Department.

From the 1840s he took a great interest in collecting engravings, including the luboks. His fundamental works on the history of Russian gravure and lubok were the first ones of the kind. His historical and bibliographical treatises, rich in actual data were highly estimated by art critics and have kept up their significance till date. Being the publisher of his own works, Dmitry Rovinsky paid a great attention to polygraphic processes (was one of the first who applied the heliograph) and printed books on excellent paper, with superb design, etc. Rovinsky signed away some of his assets to establish prizes for the best illustrated books for common folks, the best research work on art archeology and the best painting, in turn. Rovinsky’s unique collection of etchings and other art works, as well his library were legated to the Hermitage Museum, Rumyantsev’s Museum, the Public Library and the Academy of Arts.

Dmitry Rovinsky died on 23 June 1895 in Bad Wildungen, Waldeck, Germany. The "Rovinsky Collection for a Russian Iconography" was published in 2006 in German with a comprehensive commentary.

== Literature about Rovinsky ==
- Hermann Goltz: Alles von Zarin und Teufel. Europäische Russlandbilder. Die gesamten Rovinskij-Materialien für eine Russische Ikonographie. Köln: DuMont (2006) ISBN 3-8321-7725-6.
