= Koren Picture-Bible (1692–1696) =

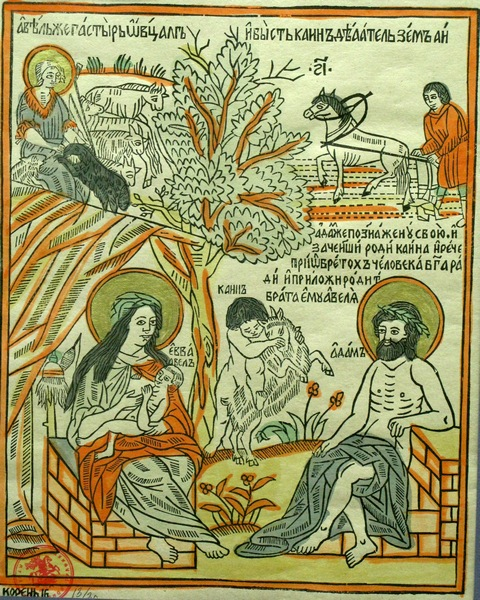
Daily life of Adam and Eve, p. 16

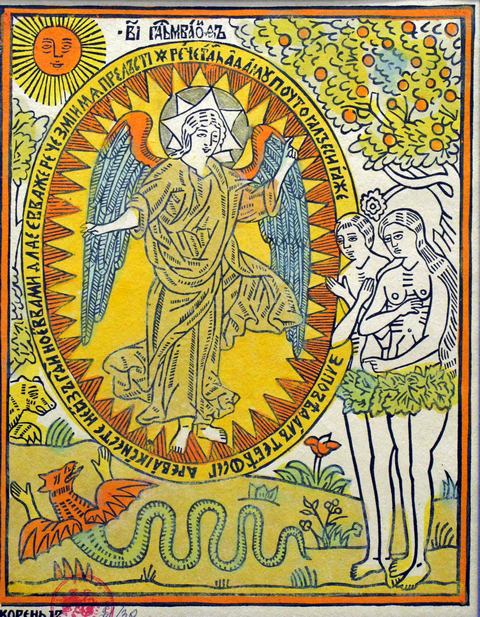
Archangel with Adam and Eve, p. 12

The Koren Picture-Bible is a printed part-bible including a series of 36 woodcuts with hand-colouring illustrating the books of Genesis and Revelation. It is the outstanding example of Russian woodcut artistry in the 17th century and of the "Koren-style" woodcut, which is characteristic of the best of the Russian religious and secular popular prints or lubok (pl. lubki) in the first half of the 18th century. The Koren Bible may be considered an example of the (misnamed) Biblia Pauperum. Twenty blocks illustrate the Creation and the Life of Adam and Eve, while sixteen illustrate Revelation. It may originally have consisted of forty woodcuts, intended, as was Piscator's Picture-Bible, to provide material for personal devotions during the forty days of Lent.

The Koren Bible survives in a single copy. The woodblocks of the Koren Bible were cut by Vasily Koren of Moscow (ru:Василий Корень). A.G Sakovich cites evidence that the artist or designer was Gury Nikitin Kineshemtsev, whose abbreviated name appears on several of the Apocalypse blocks.

== Sources of Iconography ==
The Koren Bible has as its immediate prototype that of the Kievan, Iereia Prokopii's, apocalyptic woodcut series (1646–1662). Prokopii's Apocalypse in turn follows the Luther-Piscator iconography, and the Piscator Bible draws on the original Albrecht Dürer iconography. The connection to Prokopii is evident, not just deduced from the close correspondence of the iconography in most of the pictures, but from the fact that each of Kineshemtsev's pictures bears the number of the corresponding print in the Prokopii Apocalypse. In one instance, where Kineshemtsev combined elements from two pictures of Prokopii's series, that print bears both numbers. Although Kineshemtsev more or less follows Prokopii's iconography in all his drawings, his artistry is unique and far superior to Prokopii's. Prokopii can be said to have done half the work of adapting Dürer to the Old Russian style, while Kineshemtsev made of them "freski-lubki." For example, the figures become more icon-like and certain folk design elements are introduced, a grainfield is substituted for a cityscape, and the prophets Enoch and Elijah are introduced, .

== Artist and blockcutter ==
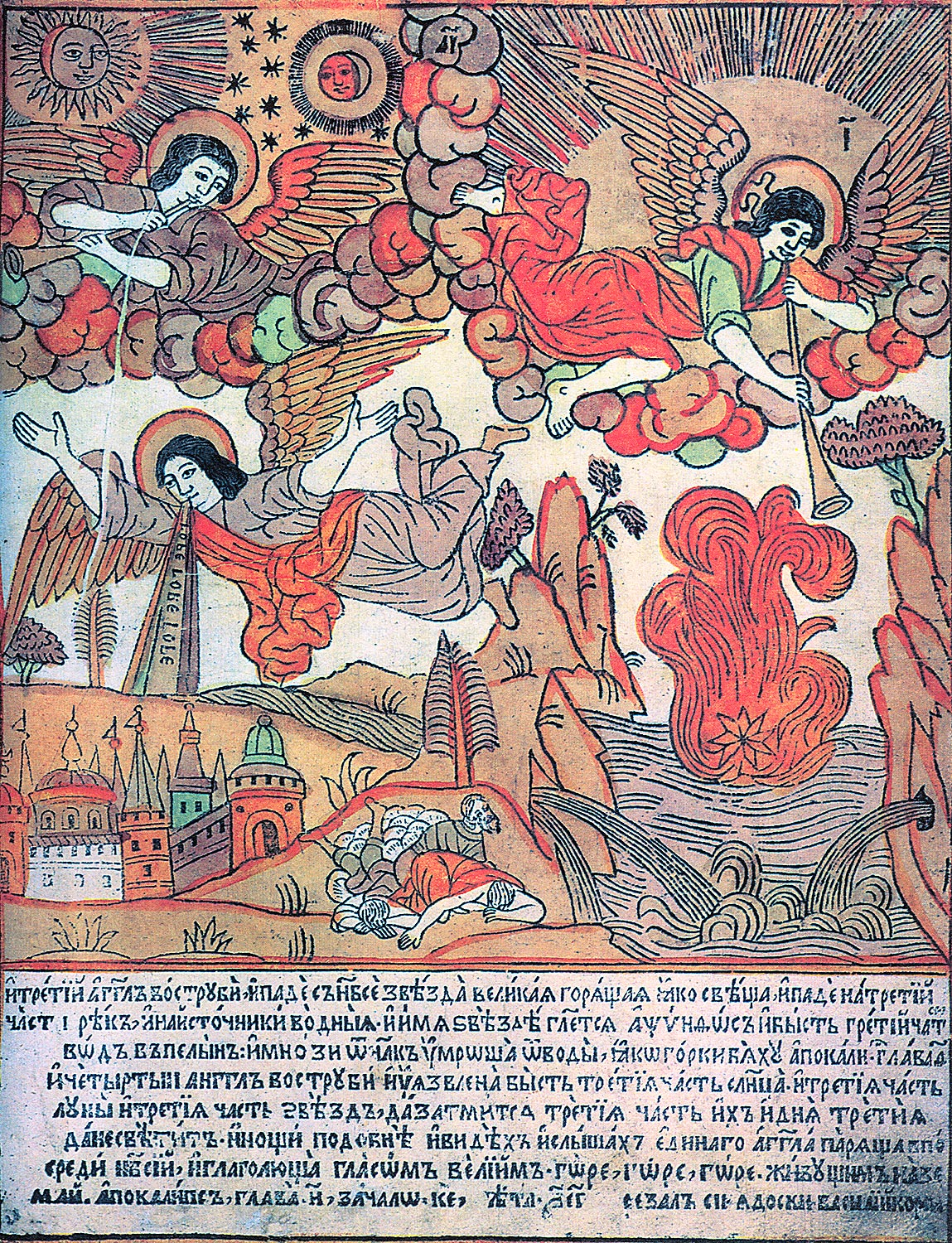
The Third trumpet sounds, p.8

Gury Nikitin Kineshemtsev was the premier fresco artist of Russia in the seventeenth century and head of the Kostroma Brotherhood of Painters until his death in 1691. He took the texts for the Koren Bible from the first Slavonic Bible translation, published in Moscow in 1663. He also incorporated non-traditional elements from the Russian edition of the Short Palaea, which includes considerable apocryphal material. Only with A.G. Sakovich's study was Vasily Koren identified. He turned up in the tax rolls as a resident of Moscow's Мещанская Слобода or Tradesman's District, an independent craftsman of modest means. He came there in 1661 when he was perhaps twenty, from Belarusian territory seized from Poland. After 1692 the Korens disappeared from the Moscow tax rolls. Perhaps they left Moscow following a son's legal troubles in 1692. It is possible that they went to the Upper Volga region, and that Koren cut the blocks there. The Koren style has long been associated with the Moscow marketplace, but many things made elsewhere were marketed in Moscow, and Koren no doubt had ties there. At any rate Koren takes credit in an unusually prominent manner, inscribing "Василии Корен рєзал сие доски" (Vasily Koren cut these blocks)on several of them.

== Relation to the Schism ==
The Koren Bible contains some uncanonical views, raising the question of its relationship to the Raskol or Schism in Russian Orthodoxy and the violent suppression of it in the 1670s-1690s. Sakovich finds the Koren Bible strongly opposed to the rebels. However, V.G. Briusova, the premier scholar of 17th century Russian fresco art, assures us that Kineshemtsev and his colleagues and merchant patrons were deeply sympathetic to the rebels.

The most distinctive interpretive rendering in the Koren Bible is the Adam and Eve story: that it was the violence of Cain against Abel—and not the disobedience to God of Adam and Eve—that was the downfall of humanity. Adam and Eve are shown at their creation with halos, losing them only temporarily when they sin and are expelled from Eden, but regaining them when they repent. They are shown living, hallowed, into old age. Thus the moral responsibility for bringing evil into the world is displaced to Cain, who envied, hated and killed his brother Abel, and lied to God. It makes the taking of life the highest crime. This does not fit with the moral stance of the Old Believers, whose leader, Protopop Avvakum, emphasized that, while the rest of creation is called into being "by the word" of God, Adam and Eve are made of clay. Their disobedience—eating from a forbidden fig tree and their resultant intoxication—leads to a sin of the flesh. The Koren Bible emphasizes that light rules both day (sun) and night (stars). And though the devil makes his bid for power, God casts him down into the abyss (Hell), which is represented by a cutaway space at the bottom corner of the picture, indicating a place beneath the surface of the earth.

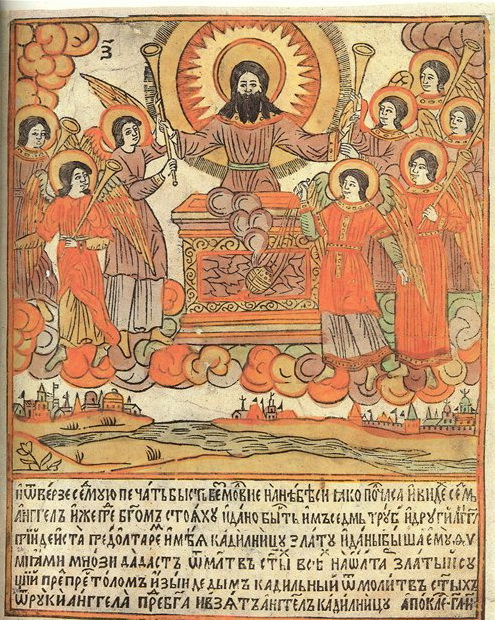
Opening of the Seventh Seal, p.26

There are other reasons not to associate the Koren Bible directly with the Old Believers or Schismatics, yet just publishing an Apocalypse at a time when masses of one's countrymen were awaiting the end of the world would seem to acknowledge or make some statement of solidarity with them. While the Russian Orthodox Church, backed by the power of the Tsar, was thundering that one owes obedience above all to God, Church and Tsar, the Koren Bible would have it that murder was the greatest sin—and not the disobedience to God of Adam and Eve. It specifically edits out a tiara seen on Antichrist in Prokopii's Apocalypse—a tiara which might have been taken to signify an Old Believer representation of the tsar or patriarch. On the other hand, Christ leading the Heavenly Host wears just a cap. A two-fingered blessing gesture might have been taken as defiance of the new Orthodoxy, which called for a three-fingered sign. There are several two-fingered blessing gestures depicted, but there are also four именословно (liturgical) blessings, considered proper by both.

Sakovich believes that the Koren Bible Apocalypse is shaped to speak against the "millenarians," i.e. the Old Believers or other sectarians who felt obliged to resist the authority of "the forces of Antichrist." She sees an affirmation that good will triumph in the end, but that it is God's affair, not man's, to bring this about. Briusova assures us that Kineshemtsev's Old Believer sympathies are well-established by his treatment of the Apocalypse, his association with other Old Believer sympathizers, and by his refusal to do the frescoes for Novo-Spassky Monastery, whose Father Superior was noted for his persecution of Old Believers. However, Gury Nikitin's treatment of Genesis departs from both Orthodox and Old Believer views. The injunction against violence may be addressed to both sides—as was Erasmus's response to the struggle between Catholicism and Protestantism in the West.

The last print of the Genesis series concerns Cain and his line and makes the point that real evil, originating in his unrepented crime, was perpetuated by Cain and his son Enoch in the building of cities in the land of Nod. This revision also provides Cain with a suitable fate: accidental shooting by his blind "brother" Lamekh. Here man is taken further from God. This is a striking view in the context of the thriving cities of the Upper Volga which nourished Kineshemtsev and his merchant-patrons. Yet perhaps precisely an urbanizing society, under the stress of change, sees its moral challenges as emanating from cities.

== Artistry and Social Context ==
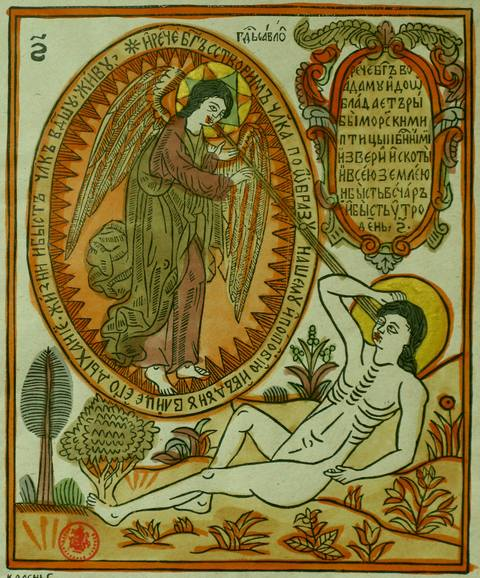
Creation of Adam, p.6

The Koren Bible is a work of sophistication, cosmopolitanism and originality. The surviving copy has an ownership history in the 18th century in the Upper Volga region and includes persons of various classes—from peasant to nobility. Briusova finds the urban art of the North an "art of the growing town, but also of the monasteries and the peasantry." The peasants of the North were largely state peasants, not serfs like the peasants of Central Russia, more dependent on crafts, fishing and trade than on agriculture, and more self-reliant. These were vigorous, independent and mobile people, unlike the agriculture-bound serfs of Central Russia. They made demands upon the church much like the demands made upon Catholicism in Western Europe during the Reformation. They produced heresies like bubbles on a boiling pot. Briusova takes the sectarian ferment as a sign of intellectual vigor, not of the "breakdown" of society. So also were the Koren Picture-Bible and the Koren School lubki. If Sakovich's interpretation is correct, The Koren Picture-Bible also represents an Erasmian road of tolerance, a road not taken, East or West.

== Reprint ==
- Сакович А. Г. Народная гравированная книга Василия Кореня, 1692—1696. М., 1983.
