= Pronina =

Pronina may refer to:

- Feminine form of the surname Pronin
- Pronina (Leninskoye Rural Settlement), Kudymkarsky District, Perm Krai
- Pronina (Verkh-Invenskoye Rural Settlement), Kudymkarsky District, Perm Krai
- Pronina (Yogvinskoye Rural Settlement), Kudymkarsky District, Perm Krai

== See also ==
- Pronino
