= Moscow school =

Old Russian art school

The Moscow school (Russian: Московская школа, romanized: Moskovskaya shkola) is the name applied to a Russian architectural and painting school in the 14th to 16th centuries. It developed during the strengthening of the Moscow principality. The buildings of Vladimir provided the basis of the Moscow architectural school, which preserved elements of the synthesis of the Byzantine and Romanesque styles.

== Architecture ==
=== Early architecture ===
In Vladimir and other older cities like Rostov and Suzdal, restoration efforts took place during the 13th century, rather than new architectural development. Vladimir never regained its former glory and only retained its formal status as the capital of the grand principality. By the end of the 13th century, there was a resurgence in the building of new churches in areas where political consolidation was taking place. The princes of Moscow and Tver fought for supremacy, which continued into the early 14th century. Tver was in the ascendant at first, with masonry building being revived in Tver nearly half a century before Moscow. The foundations of the first stone church in Moscow were laid on 4 August 1326 during the reign of Ivan I after the seat of the Russian metropolitan was moved to Moscow. The chronicler records:

the foundations of the first stone church in Moscow were laid in the square in the name of the Dormition [...] of the Holy Mother of God by the Most Reverend Metropolitan Pyotr and the Most Noble Prince Ivan Kalita.

Masonry building continued in the following years with the Dormition Cathedral being completed in 1327. This was followed by the Belfry of Saint John Climacus (1329) and the Cathedral of the Savior on the Bor (1330). Finally, the Cathedral of the Archangel was completed in 1333. The white-stone walls and towers of the Kremlin were built in 1366–1368. By the late 14th century, the Muscovite type of white-stone church emerged, being compact and having four pillars, heightened ribbed arches, tiers of kokoshniks, and carved decorative belts on the facades. This was a modification of the traditions of the Vladimir-Suzdal school. The Nativity Church in the Kremlin (1393–1394) is the oldest surviving monument in the Kremlin.

The Moscow architectural school, which extended to the smaller principalities that were incorporated, evolved steadily throughout the 15th century. In smaller towns, a more distinct type of church emerged, one that returned to the Vladimir school. A group of cathedrals built at the end of the 14th century and the beginning of the 15th century exemplifies the "early Moscow style" that preceded the arrival of Renaissance craftsmen. These include the Cathedral of the Dormition in Zvenigorod (1396–1398), the Cathedral of the Nativity of the Virgin in the Savvino-Storozhevsky Monastery (1405–1408), and the Cathedral of the Trinity in the Trinity Lavra of St. Sergius (c. 1422). Scholars of Moscow's architectural history have emphasized that the traditions of a number of Russian principalities were integrated into a unified system in the early 15th century. The Cathedral of the Savior in the Andronikov Monastery (1425–1427) is often cited as the main example of this.

=== Renaissance ===
The late 15th century marked a significant period for masonry architecture, with many new masonry buildings appearing in the Moscow Kremlin and in other parts of Moscow. Eight new churches were built within the Kremlin itself. Brick began to replace the previously used limestone ("white stone"), likely under the influence of brick architecture in northern Germany's coastal towns, with which Novgorod had trade connections. It is believed that that a group of Novgorodian masters worked in Moscow and introduced new techniques. Following the end of Mongol suzerainty, Ivan III transformed Russian architectural style after contacts with Italian cities were restored, introducing new features that were preserved throughout the following centuries. Italian Renaissance masters worked in Russia from 1475 to 1539. The career of Aristotele Fioravanti is considered to be evidence that Moscow attracted leading Italian masters. The Dormition Cathedral in the Kremlin (1475–1479) reflects the spirit of early Vladimir and Fioravanti used the Dormition Cathedral in Vladimir, a symbol of the center of the Russian Church, as his model while introducing new influences at the same time.

=== Gallery ===
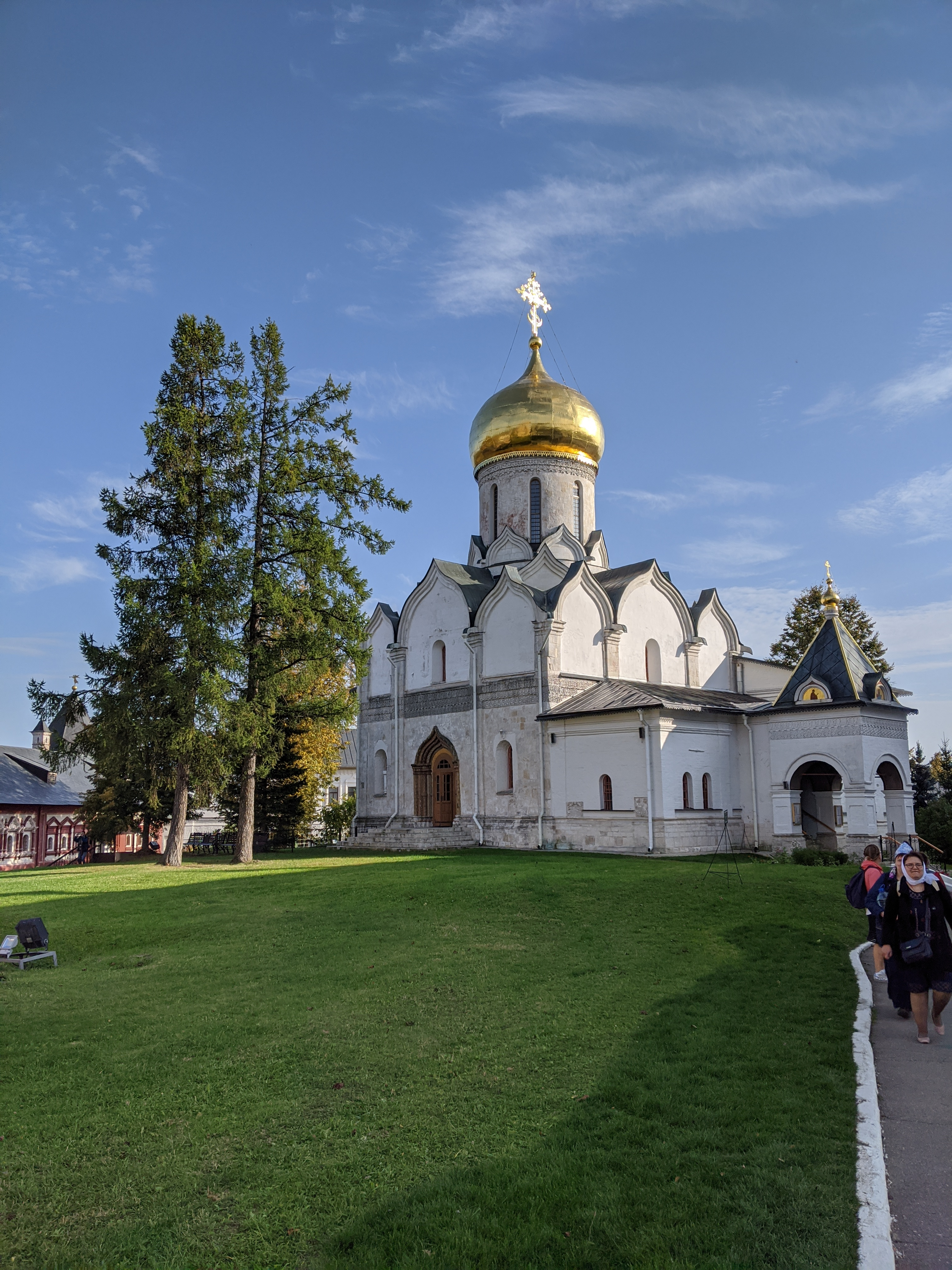
Cathedral of the Nativity of the Virgin in the Savvino-Storozhevsky Monastery, 1405–1408

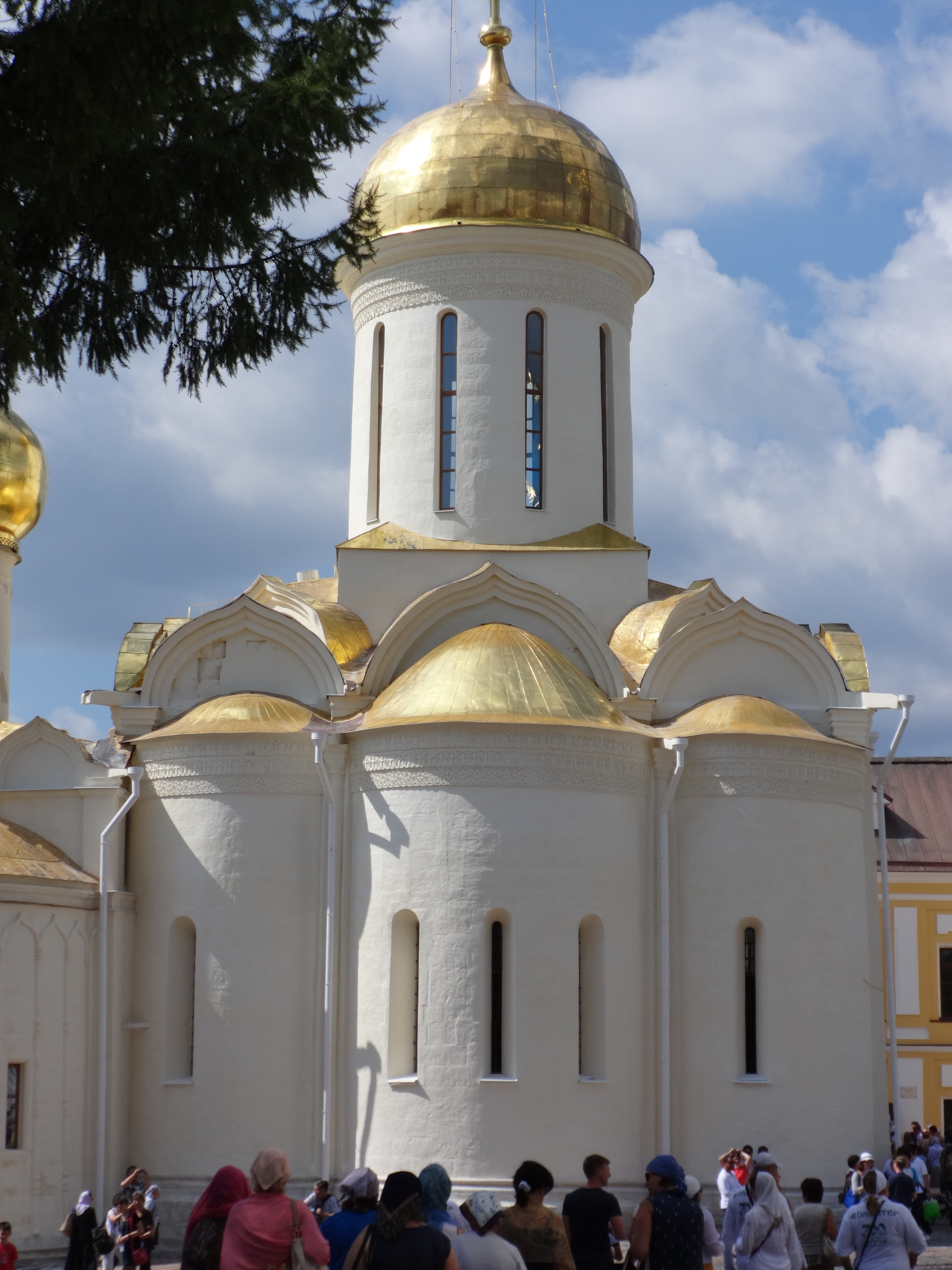
Cathedral of the Trinity of the Trinity Lavra of St. Sergius, c. 1422

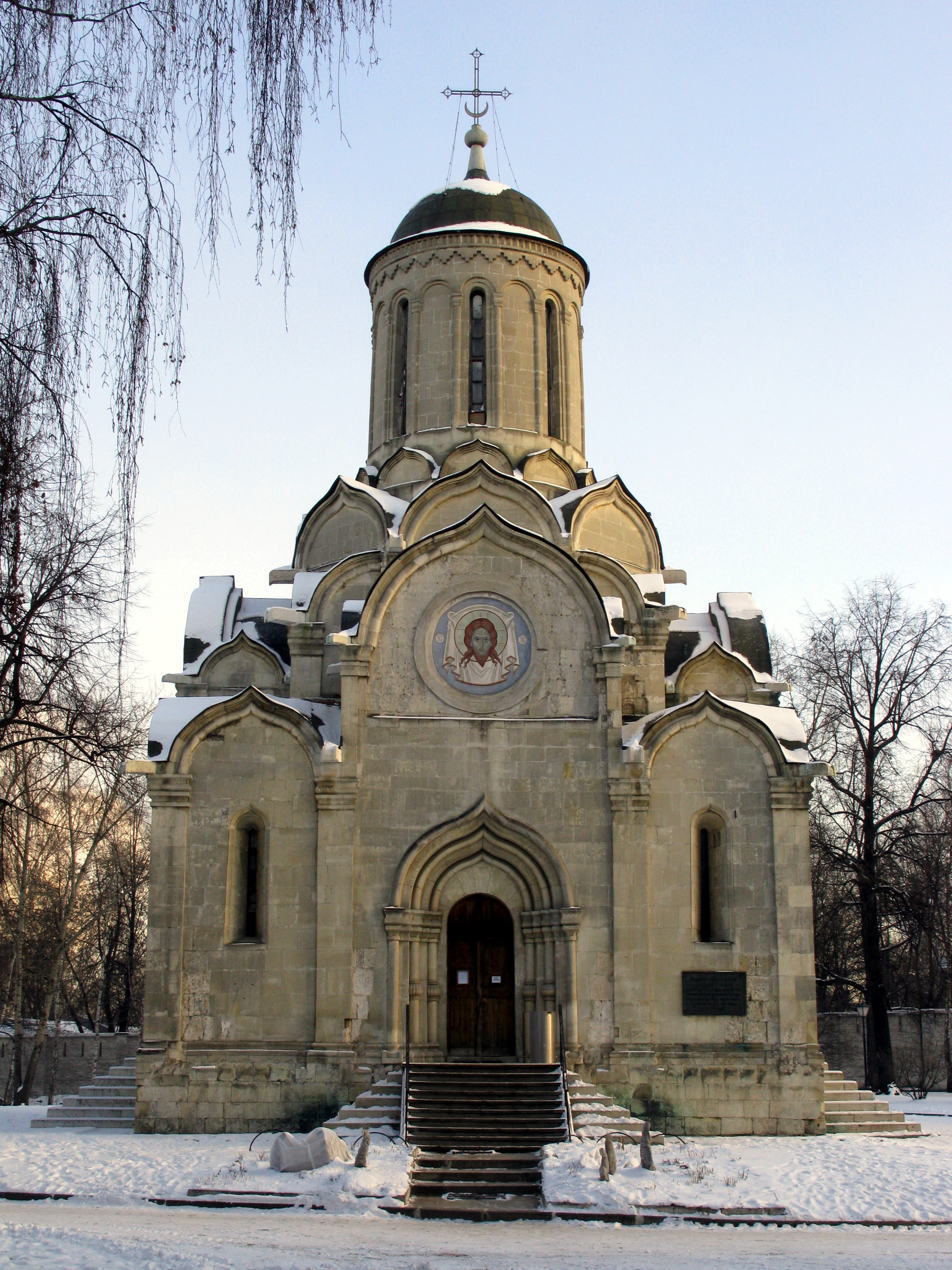
Cathedral of the Savior in the Andronikov Monastery, 1425–1427

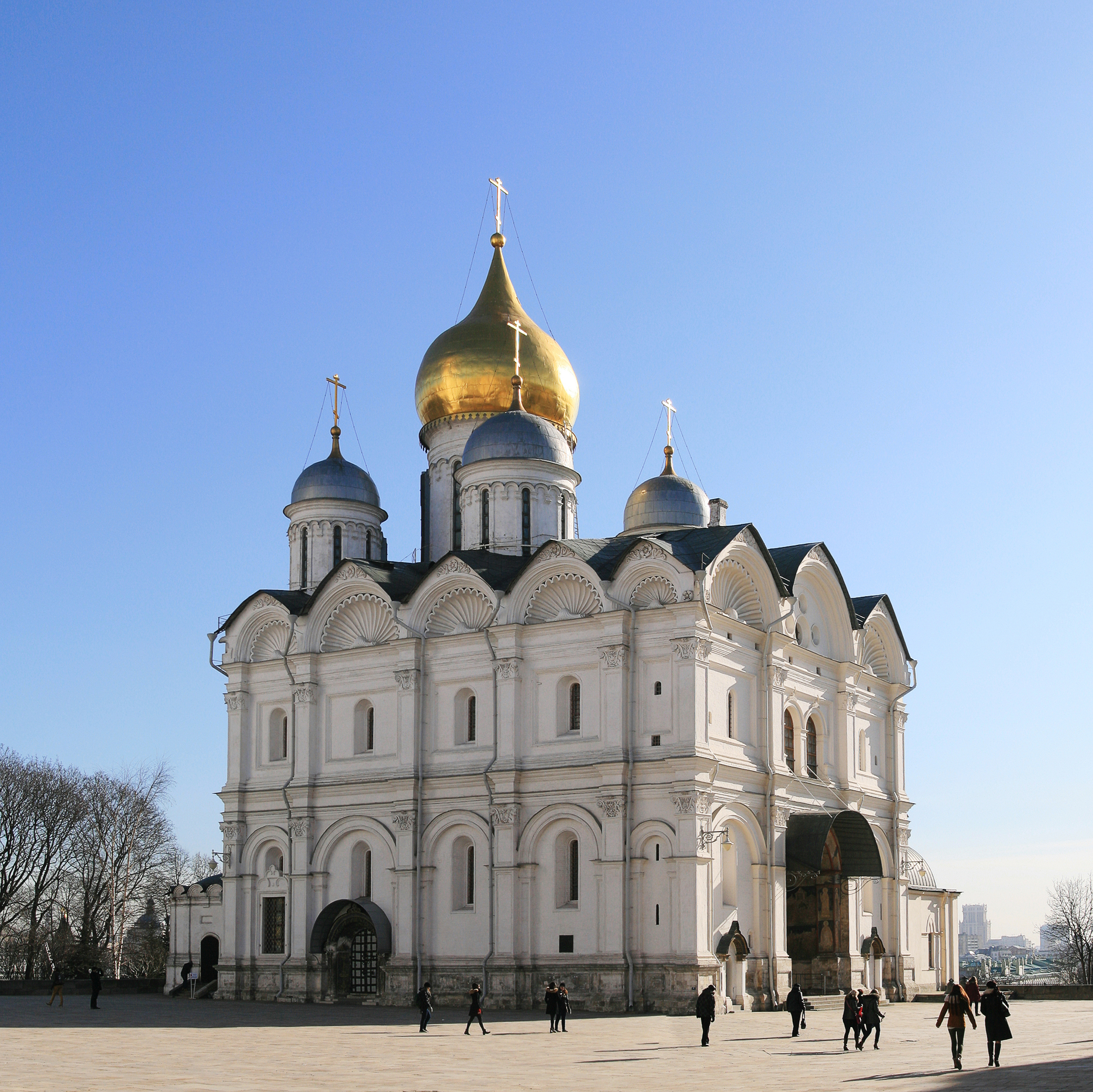
Cathedral of the Archangel in the Moscow Kremlin, 1505–1508

== Painting ==
The basis of the Moscow school of painting was the synthesis of local traditions with Byzantine and South Slavic art. From the mid-14th century, two stylistic lines appeared: one associated with monastic art and the other with large-scale depictions. The flourishing of the Moscow school in the late 14th and early 15th centuries is associated with Theophanes the Greek, Andrei Rublev and Daniel Chorny. Andrei Rublev led the school in the early 15th century and became one of the most celebrated Russian icon painters. Rublev's traditions were continued by Dionisius in the late 15th and early 16th centuries. His icons and frescoes were known for their refined proportions, decorative festive coloring, and harmonious composition. The achievements of the Moscow school significantly influenced the development of the all-Russian style in the 16th century.

=== Gallery ===
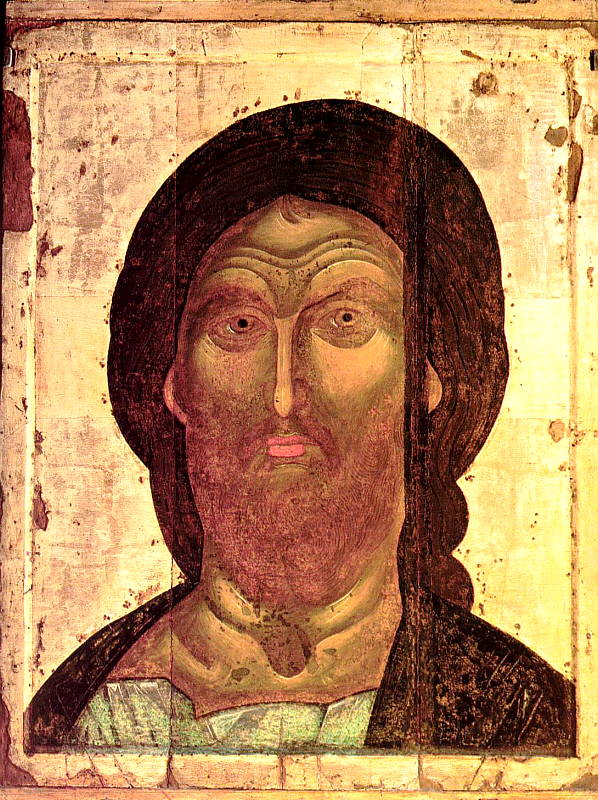
The Savior with the Fierce Eye, 1340s

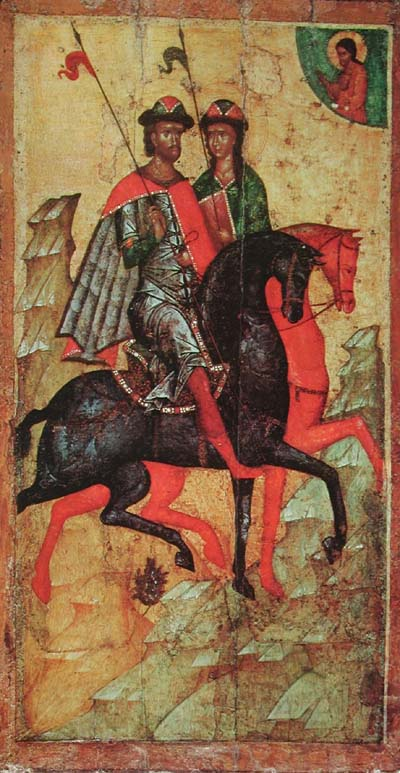
Saints Boris and Gleb on Horseback, mid-14th century

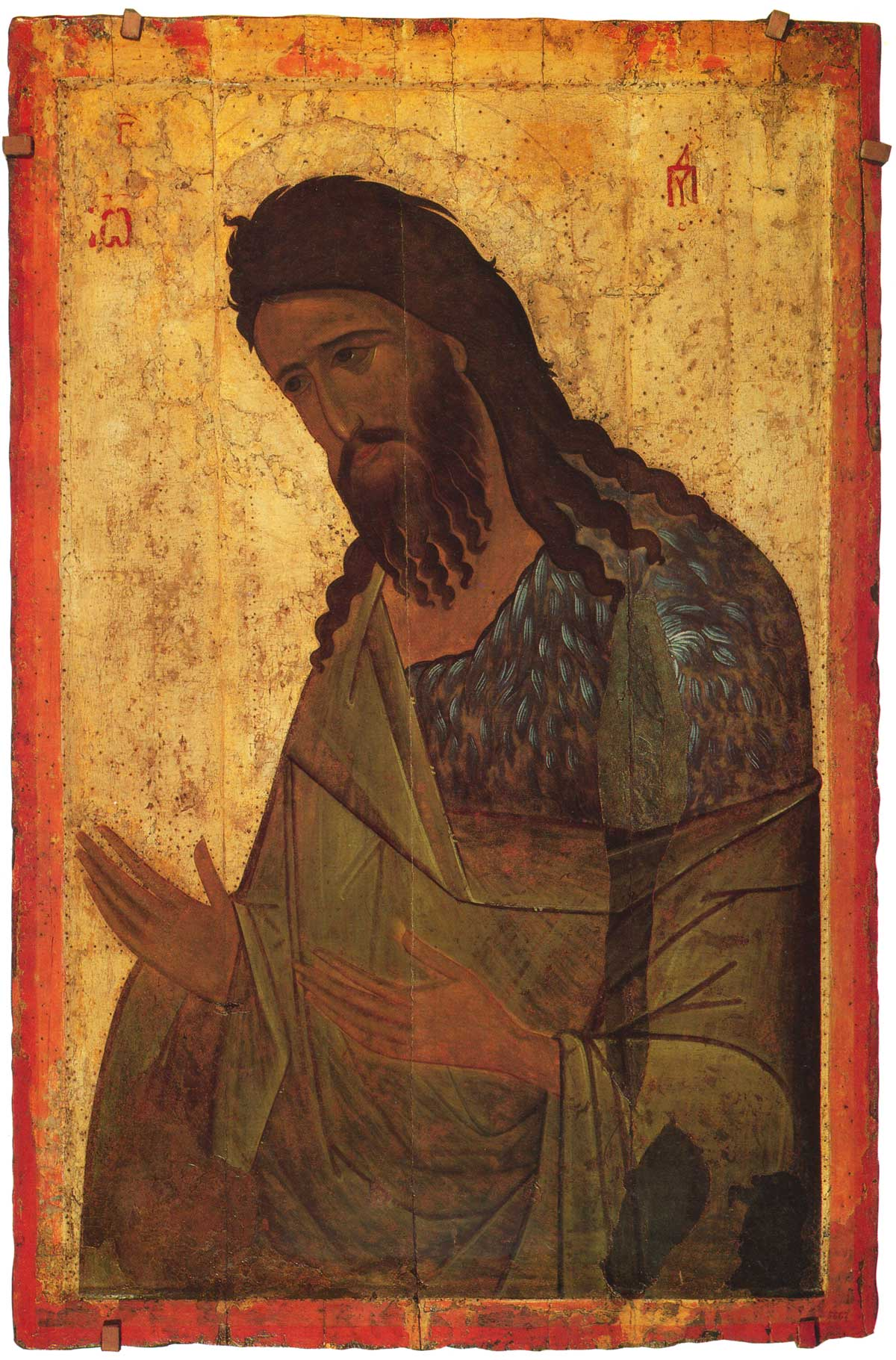
John the Baptist, late 14th century

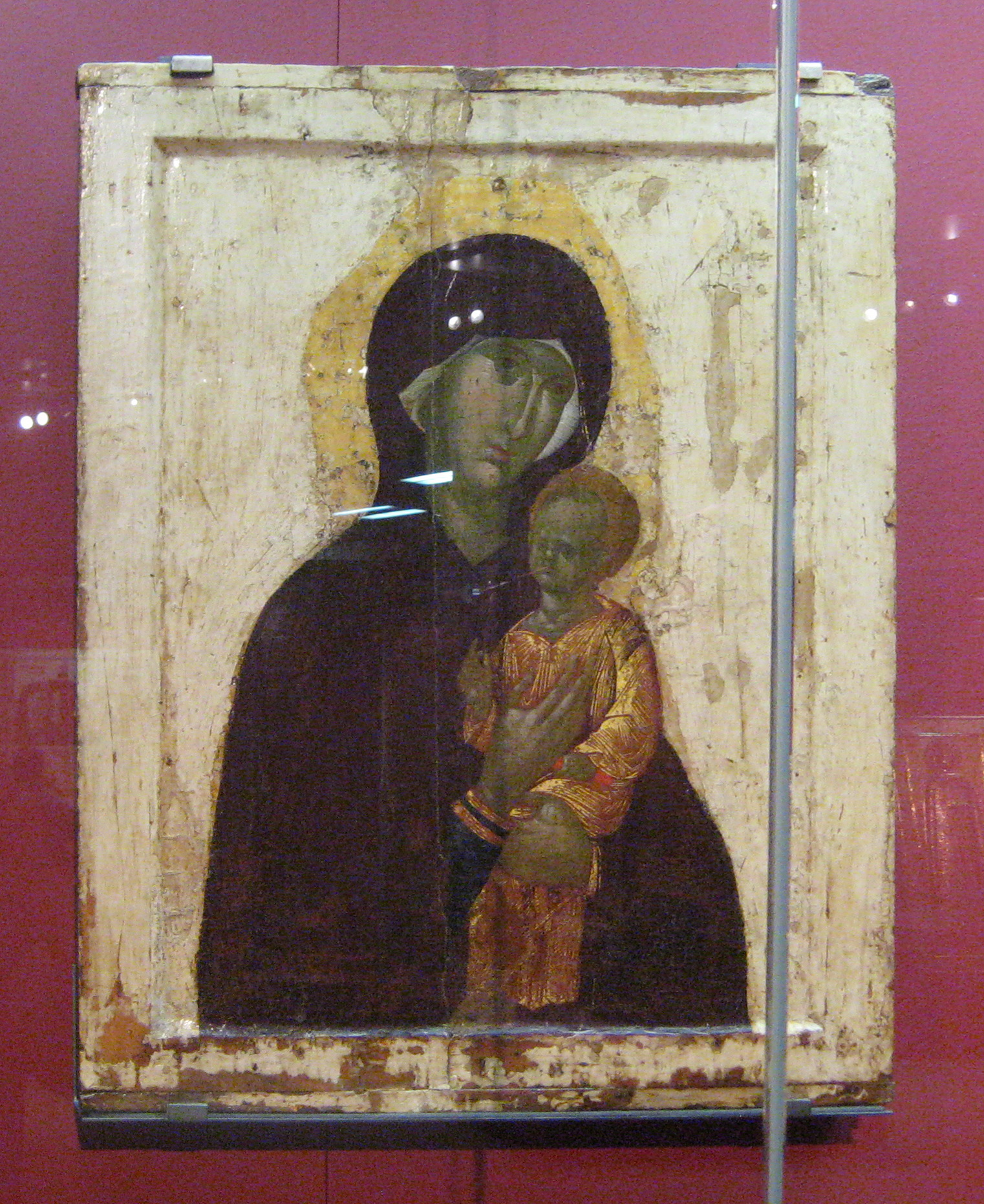
Pimenov Icon of the Mother of God, 1380s

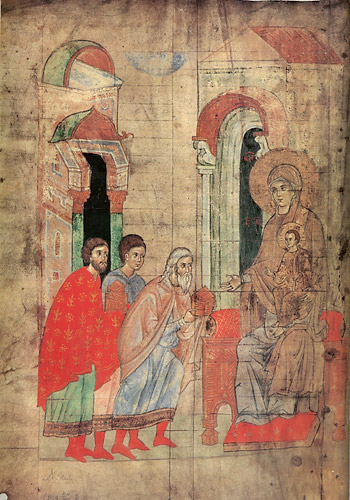
Adoration of the Magi, Siysky Gospel, 1339

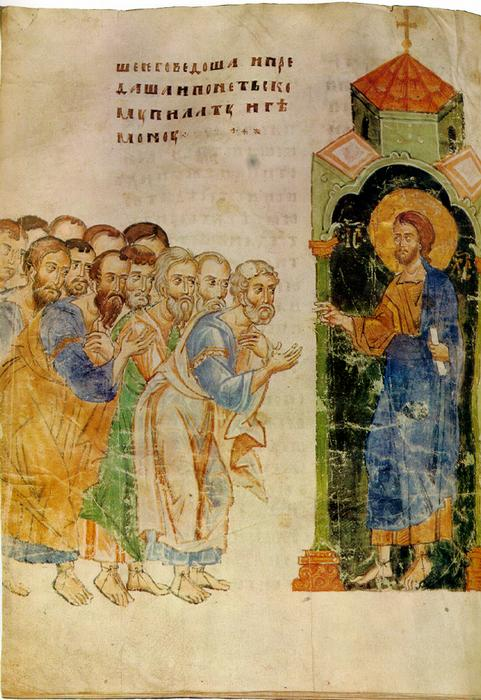
The Apostles to Sermons, Siysky Gospel, 1399

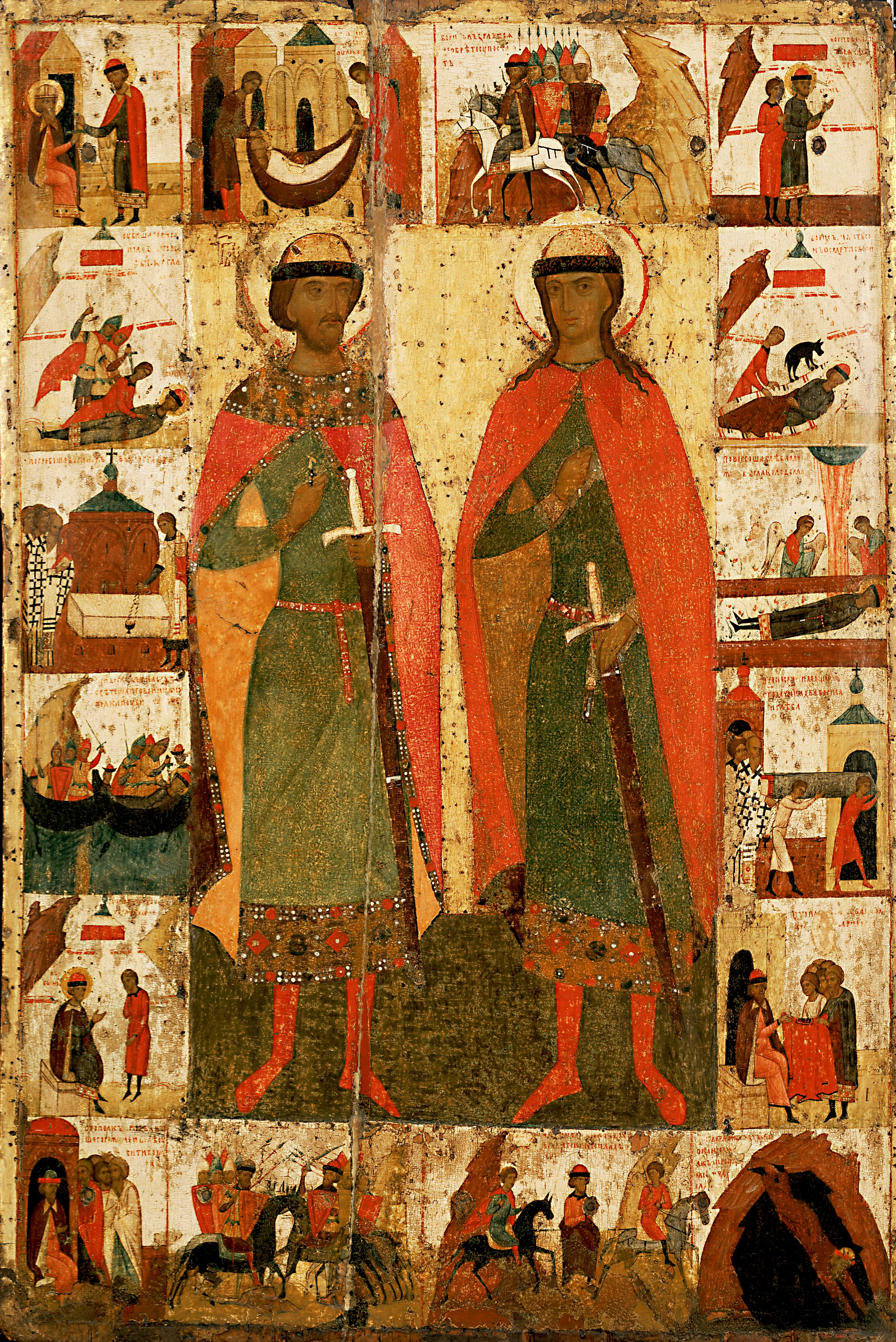
Boris and Gleb with Life, mid-14th century

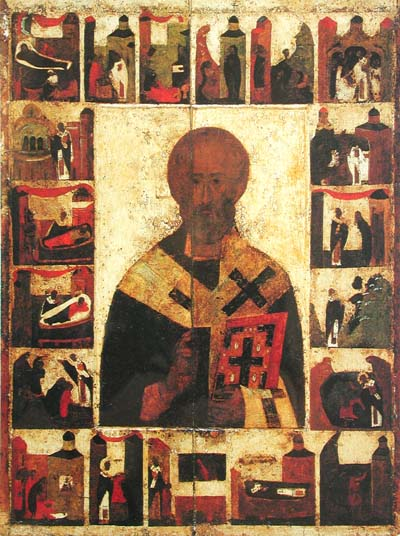
Icon of Saint Nicholas, 1380s

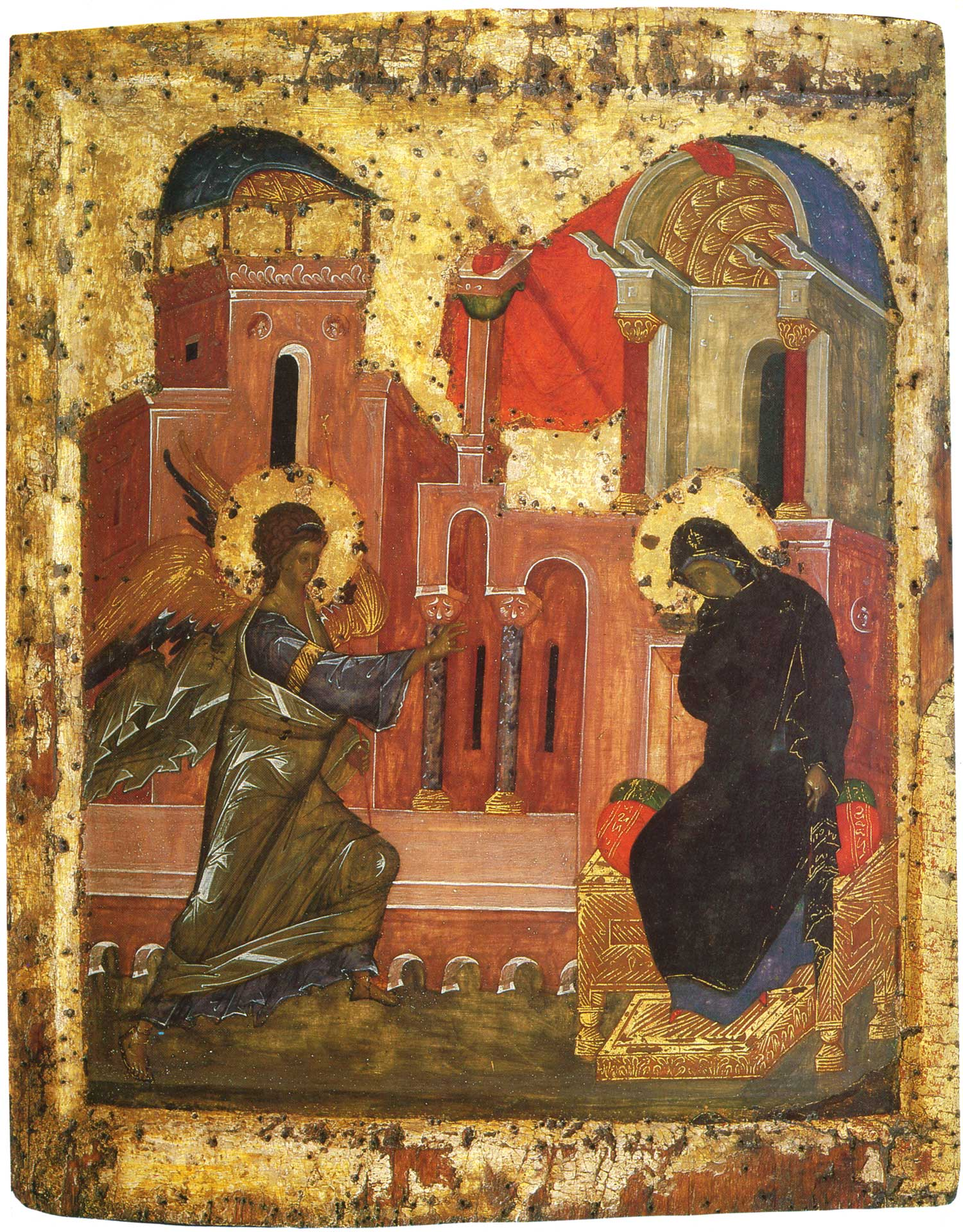
The Annunciation, late 14th century

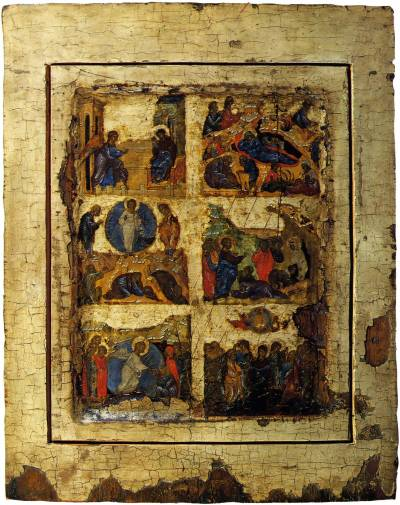
The Feasts, late 14th century

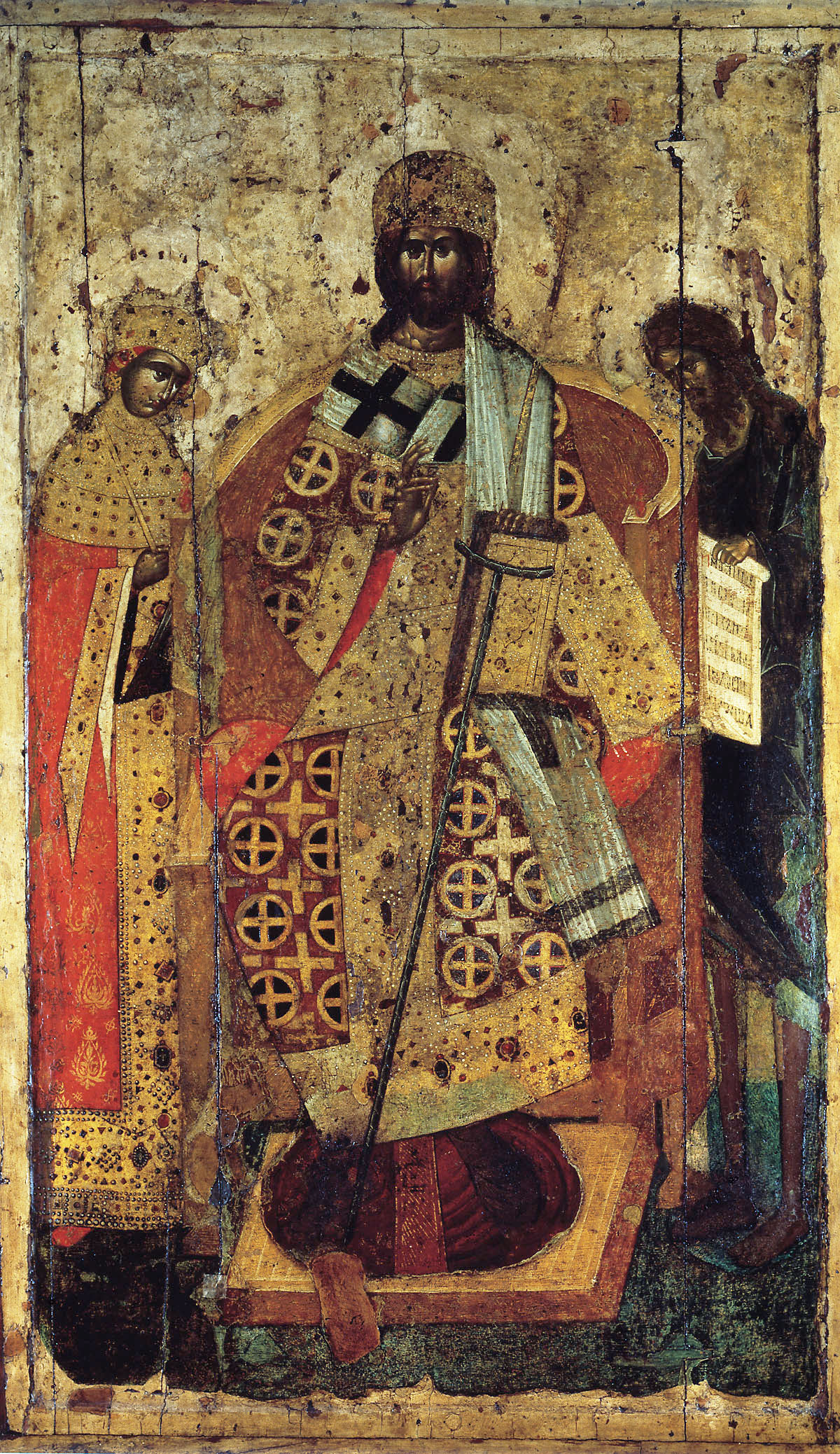
The Queen Stands, late 14th century

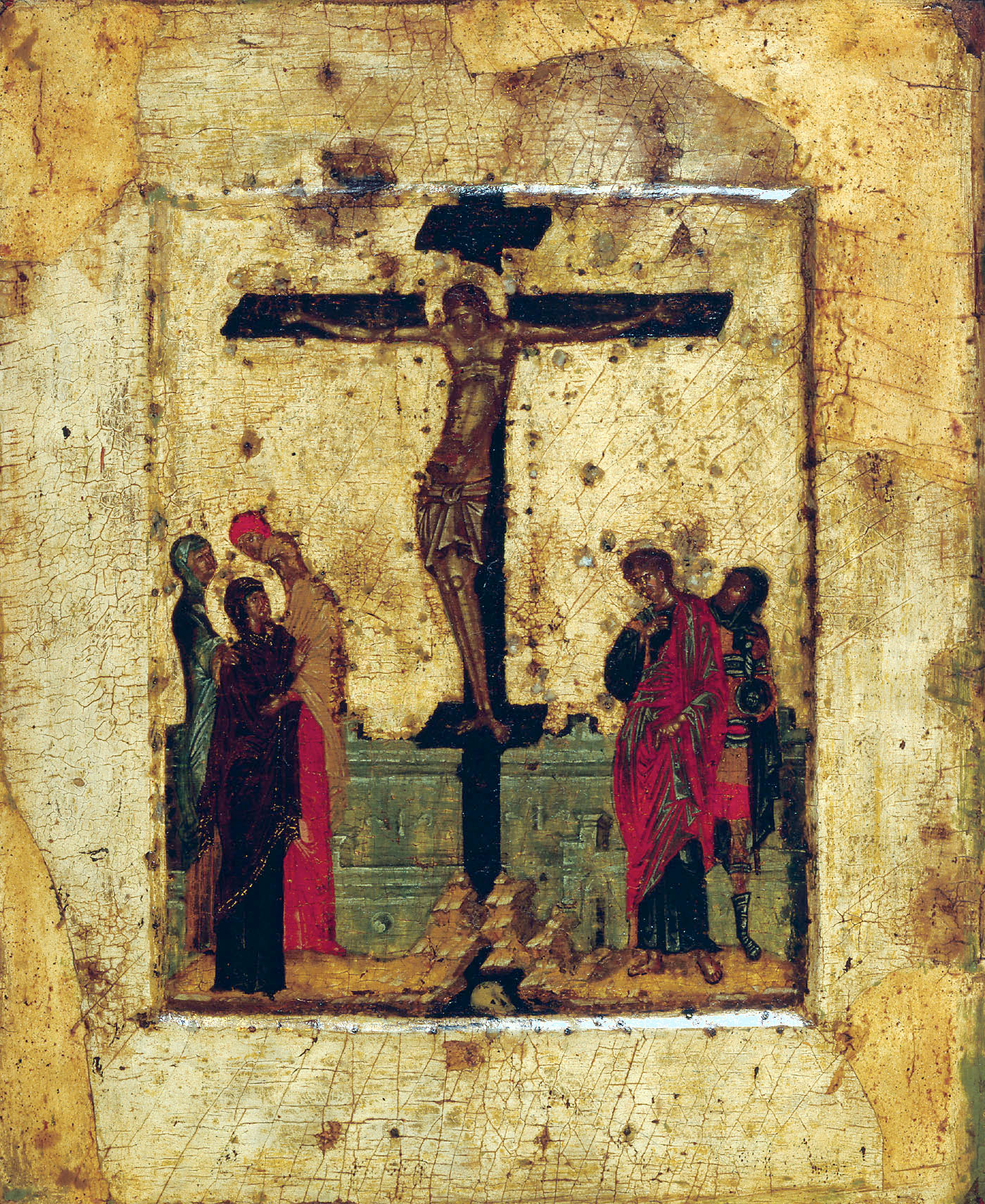
Crucifixion, late 14th century

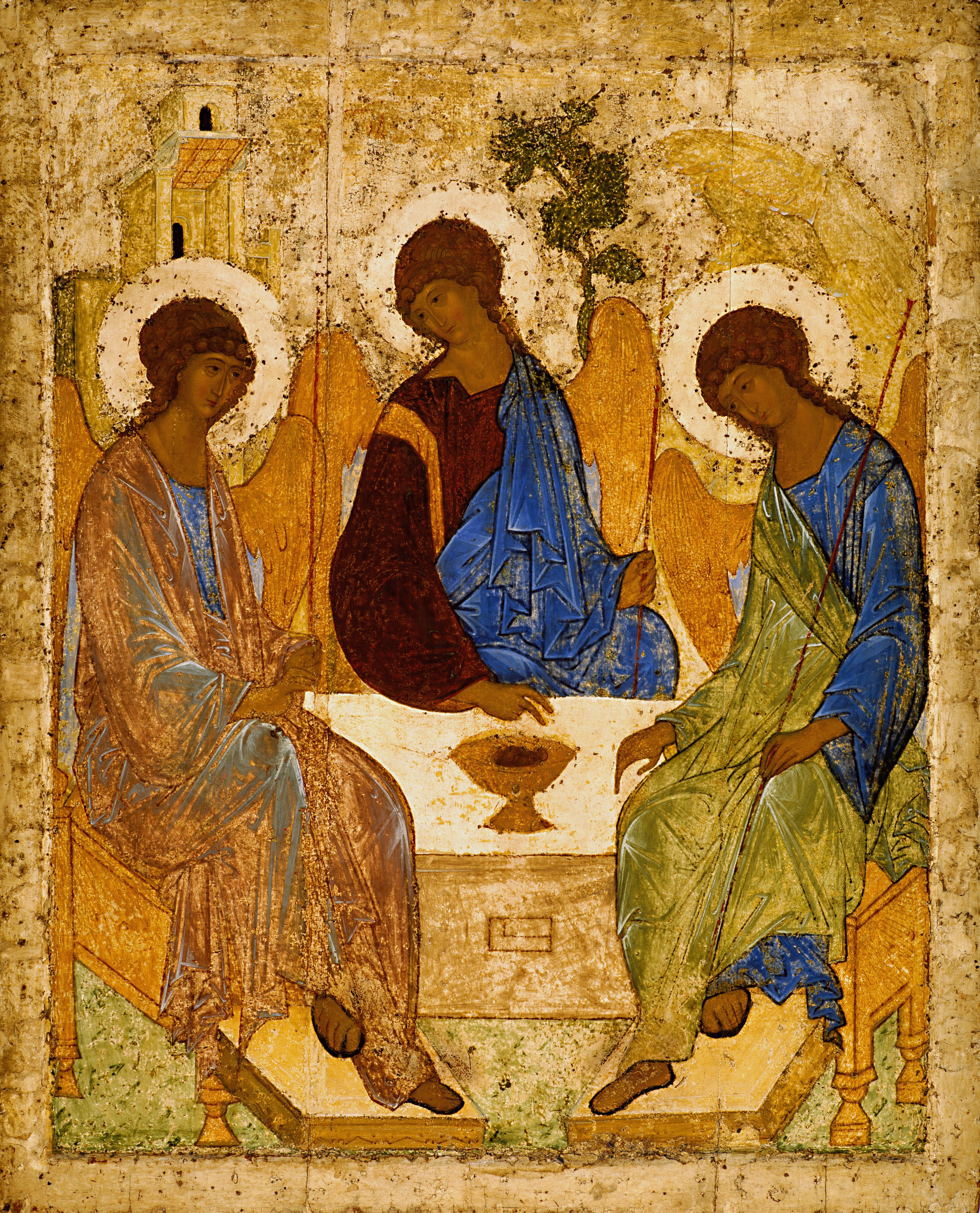
The Trinity, early 15th century

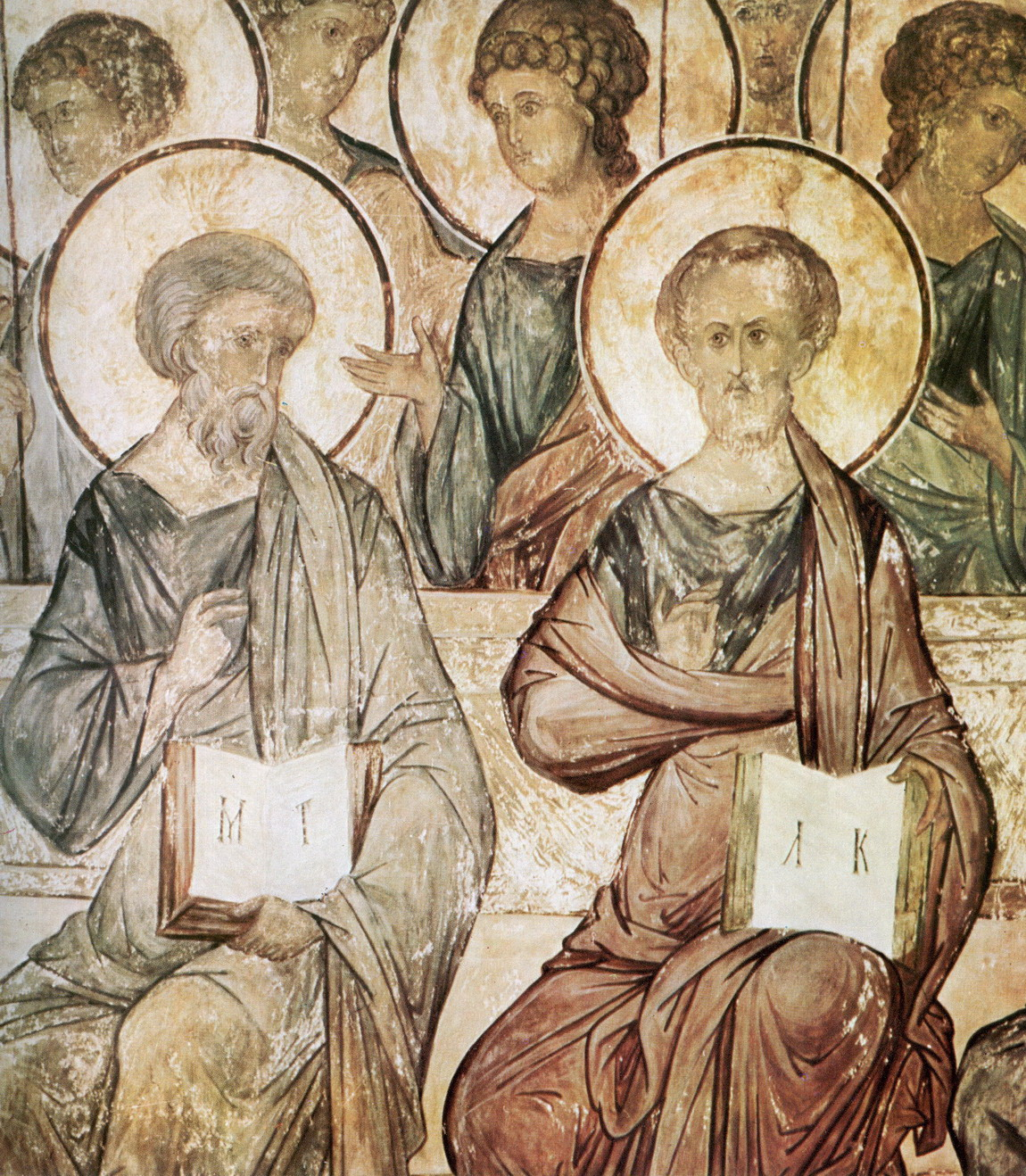
Fresco in the Dormition Cathedral, Vladimir, early 15th century

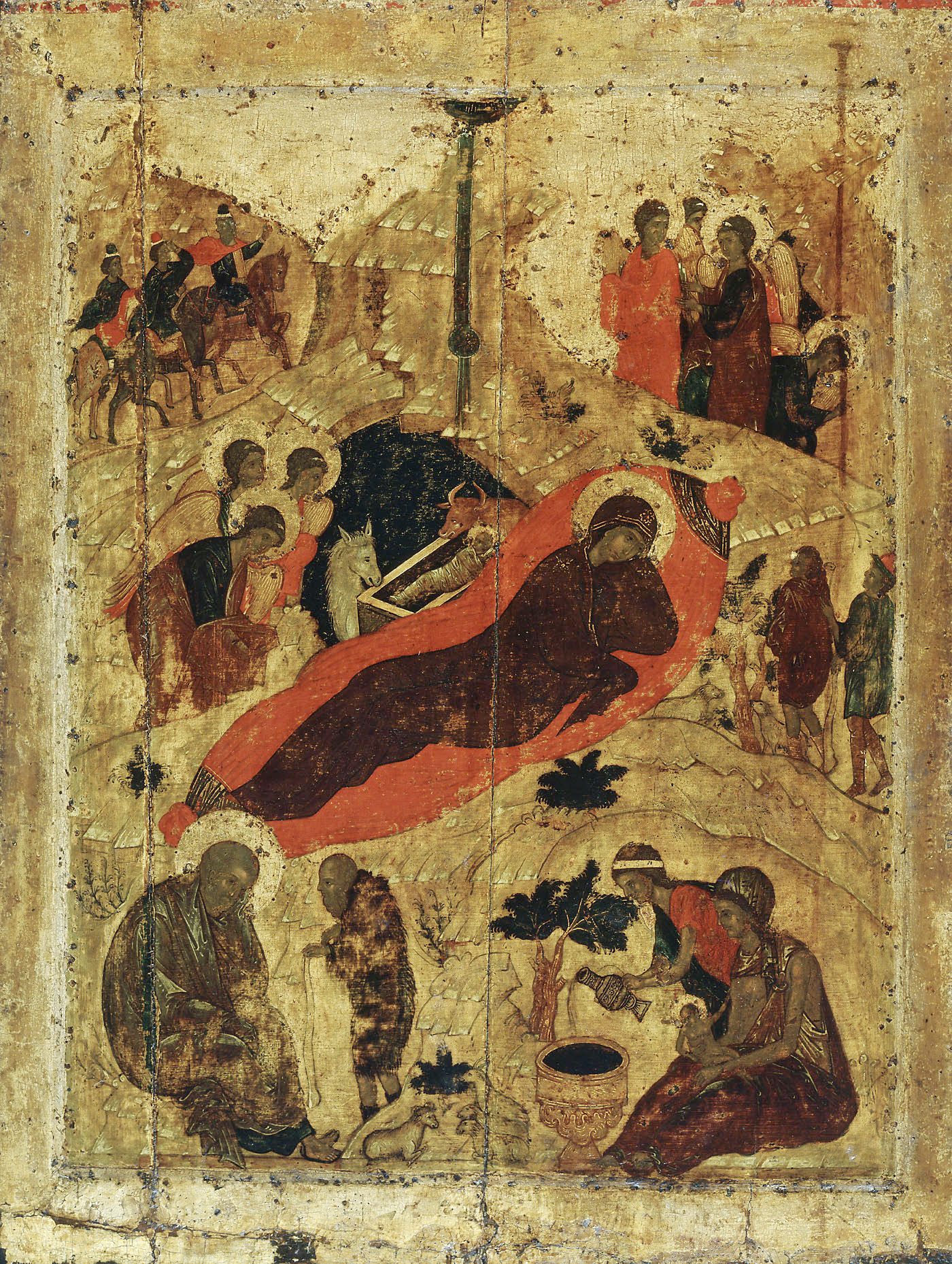
The Nativity of Christ, early 15th century

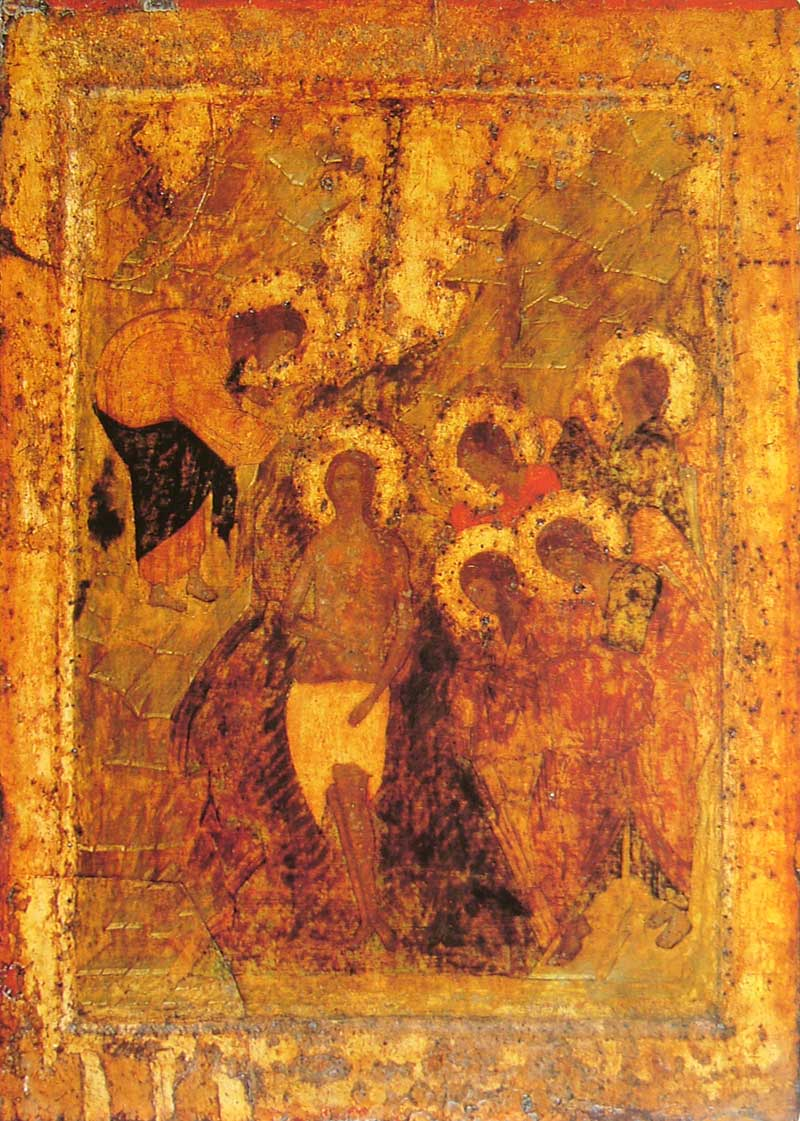
The Baptism, early 15th century

== Sources ==
- Alfeyev, Hilarion (2011). Orthodox Christianity Volume III: The Architecture, Icons, and Music of the Orthodox Church. Yonkers, NY: St. Vladimir's Seminary Press. ISBN 9780881415032.
- Riasanovsky, Nicholas V.; Steinberg, Mark D. (2019). A history of Russia (Ninth ed.). New York: Oxford University Press. ISBN 978-0190645588.
- Shvidkovsky, Dmitry Olegovich (1 January 2007). Russian Architecture and the West. Yale University Press. ISBN 978-0-300-10912-2.
- Smirnova, E. S. (2013). "Московская школа" [Moscow school]. In Kravets, S. L. (ed.). Большая российская энциклопедия. Том 21: Монголы — Наноматериалы (in Russian). Большая российская энциклопедия. pp. 273–274. ISBN 978-5-85270-355-2. Archived from the original on 11 July 2025.
