= Prokhorov =

Prokhorov (masculine, Russian: Прохоров) or Prokhorova (feminine, Russian: Прохорова) is a Russian patronymic surname derived from the given name Prokhor. Notable people with the surname include:

- Alexander Prokhorov (1916–2002), Russian physicist
- Aleksandr Prokhorov (footballer) (1946–2005), Soviet soccer player and coach
- Alexandra Prokhorova, Russian-Spanish actress, screenwriter, director and poet
- Alexey Prokhorov (1923–2002), Soviet aircraft pilot and twice Hero of the Soviet Union
- Anton Prokhorov (born 1992), Russian Paralympic athlete
- Irina Prokhorova (born 1956), Russian philologist, literary critic and cultural historian
- Maria Prokhorova (1903–1993), Russian scientist and biologist
- Mikhail Prokhorov (born 1965), Russian–Israeli oligarch and politician
- Militsa Prokhorova, Soviet architect
- Nikita Prokhorov (born 1991), Russian Paralympic athlete
- Olga Prokhorova (born 1979), Russian swimmer
- Varvara Prokhorova (born 1991), Russian skier
- Vitali Prokhorov (born 1966), Soviet–Russian ice hockey player
- Vladimir Prokhorov (born 1984), Russian luger
- Yekaterina Prokhorova, Russian entrepreneur
- Yelena Prokhorova (born 1978), Russian heptathlete
- Yevgeniya Prokhorova (1912–1942), Soviet aviator
- Yuri Vasilevich Prokhorov (1929–2013), Russian mathematician
  - Lévy–Prokhorov metric
  - Prokhorov's theorem
