= Our Lady of the Don =

Painting attributed to Theophanes the Greek

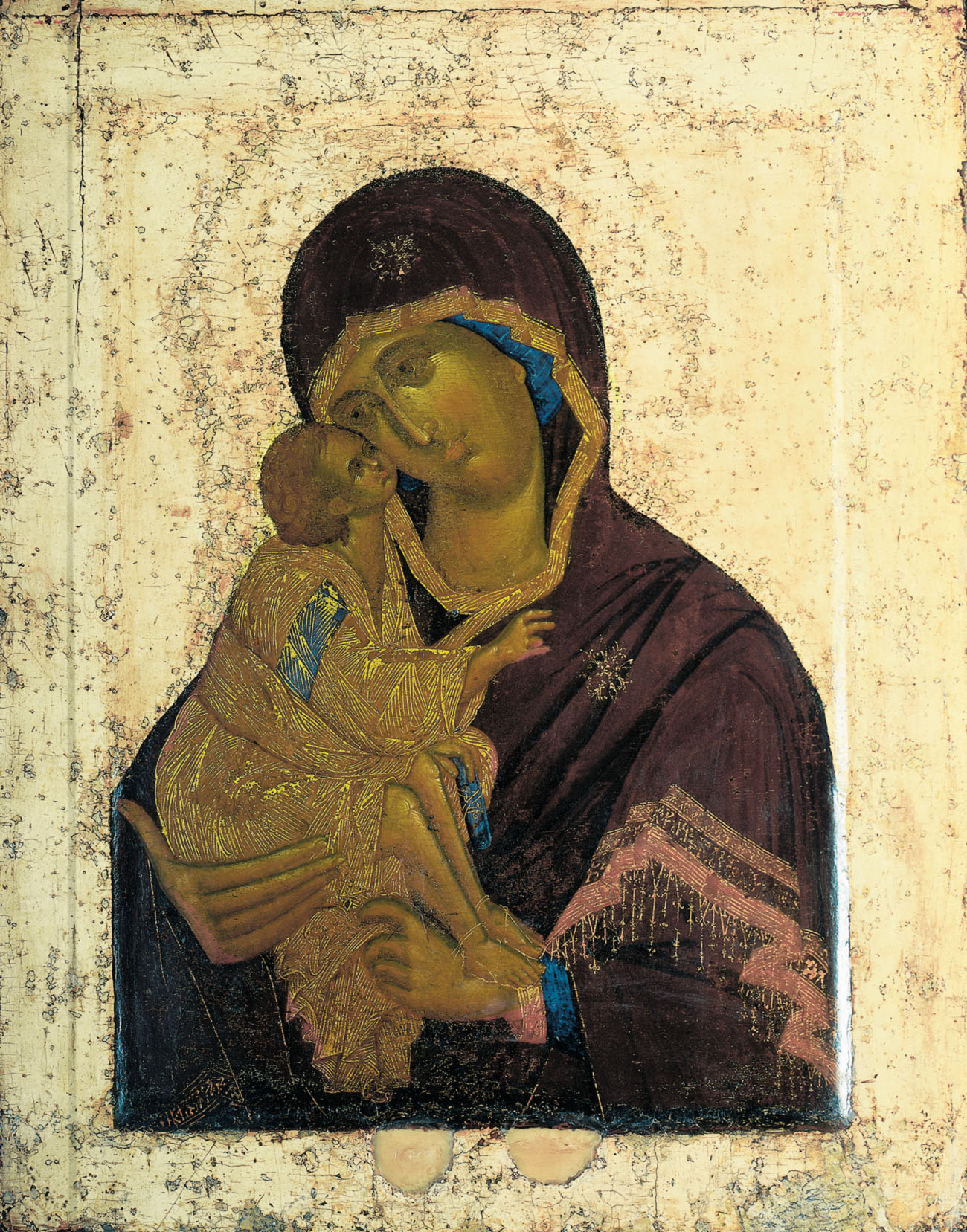
- Artist: Theophanes the Greek
- Year: c. 1382 – c. 1395
- Type: Wood, tempera
- Location: Cathedral of Christ the Saviour, Moscow

Our Lady of the Don (Russian: Донская икона Божией Матери) is a 14th-century Eleusa icon representing the Virgin Mary with the infant Jesus Christ.

== History ==
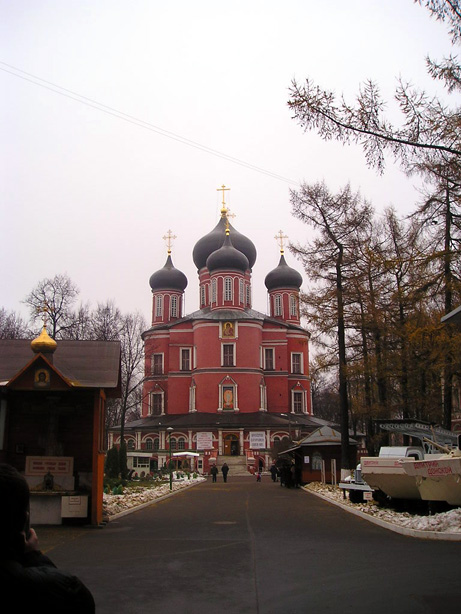
Donskoy Monastery is the main shrine of the icon

The origins of the icon and the exact date of its creation are debated. In the donation book of the Donskoy Monastery, compiled in 1692, the icon was a gift from the Don Cossacks from Sirotinskaya to Dmitry Donskoy on the eve of the Battle of Kulikovo (1380), in which a united Russian army defeated the forces of Mamai.

However, some researchers regard this account as folklore and believe that the icon was painted after the battle. Various descriptions of the icon depict different original locations of the icon. According to these versions—such as the interpretation of Oleg Ulyanov—it was painted for the Dormition Cathedral in the Simonov Monastery in Moscow; the icon was potentially transferred in 1567 to the Cathedral of the Annunciation. Ulyanov said: "they took the icons [...] for copying, and from Simonov [Monastery]". According to Valentina Antonova, the icon was originally located in the Assumption Cathedral in Kolomna, built by order of Dmitry Donskoy, where Theophanes the Greek and his pupils presumably worked to create the fresco ensemble and the iconostasis (c. 1382 – c. 1395).

The first mention of the icon is found in the Nikon Chronicle, dated to the second half of the 16th century. It is possible that the veneration of the icon was established as a symbolic link between the Battle of Kulikovo and the capture of Kazan in 1552, in which another protective icon was introduced to accompany the Our Lady of Vladimir icon.

The icon had been in the collection of the Tretyakov Gallery since 1930. Every year, by September 1st (the feast day of the Icon of Our Lady of the Don), the Gallery's staff delivered the icon to the Donskoy Monastery in Moscow.

On 3 April 2026, the Donskoy Icon was transported to the Russian Orthodox Church for free use for a period of forty-nine years. On 4 April, the icon was displayed for public veneration at the Cathedral of Christ the Saviour in Moscow. The icon will remain at the cathedral until restoration work is completed at Donskoy Monastery, after which it will be placed in the iconostasis of the monastery's Great Cathedral. The icon remains as state property and under the management of the Tretyakov Gallery.

== See also ==
- Eleusa icon

== Sources ==
- Parppei, Kati M. J. (5 January 2017). The Battle of Kulikovo Refought: “The First National Feat”. BRILL. ISBN 978-90-04-33794-7.
