= Pronin =

Pronin (Russian: Про́нин), or Pronina (feminine; Про́нина), is a Russian a Russian patronymic surname derived from the given name Pronya, a diminutive of "Prokhor". Notable people with the surname include:

- Ivan Pronin
- Mikhail Pronin
- Vladimir Pronin (disambiguation)
- Vasily Pronin
- Nikolai Pronin
- Natali Pronina

== Fictional characters ==
- Major Pronin, fictional super-Chekist created by Lev Ovalov, later a butt of Russian humor
- Captain Pronin, grandson of Major Pronin from a Russian animated film series
