= Prokhin =

Prokhin (masculine) or Prokhina (feminine) is a Russian patronymic surname derived from the given name Prokha, a diminutive of "Prokhor". Notable people with the surname include:

- Danila Prokhin
- Yevgeniy Prokhin
