= Proshkin =

Proshkin (masculine, Russian: Прошкин) or Proshkina (feminine, Russian: Прошкина) is a Russian patronymic surname derived from the given name Proshka, a diminutive of "Prokhor". Notable people with the surname include:

- Aleksandr Proshkin (born 1940), Russian filmmaker
- Vitali Proshkin (born 1976), Russian ice hockey player
- Yegor Proshkin
