= Prokhorenko =

Prokhorenko (Ukrainian: Прохоренко) is a gender-neutral Ukrainian patronymic surname derived from the given name Prokhor. Notable people with the surname include

- Alexander Prokhorenko (1990–2016), Russian Spetsnaz officer
- Yuriy Prokhorenko (born 1951), Ukrainian pole vaulter
- Zhanna Prokhorenko (1940–2011), Soviet actress
