= Theophanes the Greek =

Byzantine Greek artist (c. 1340 – c. 1410)

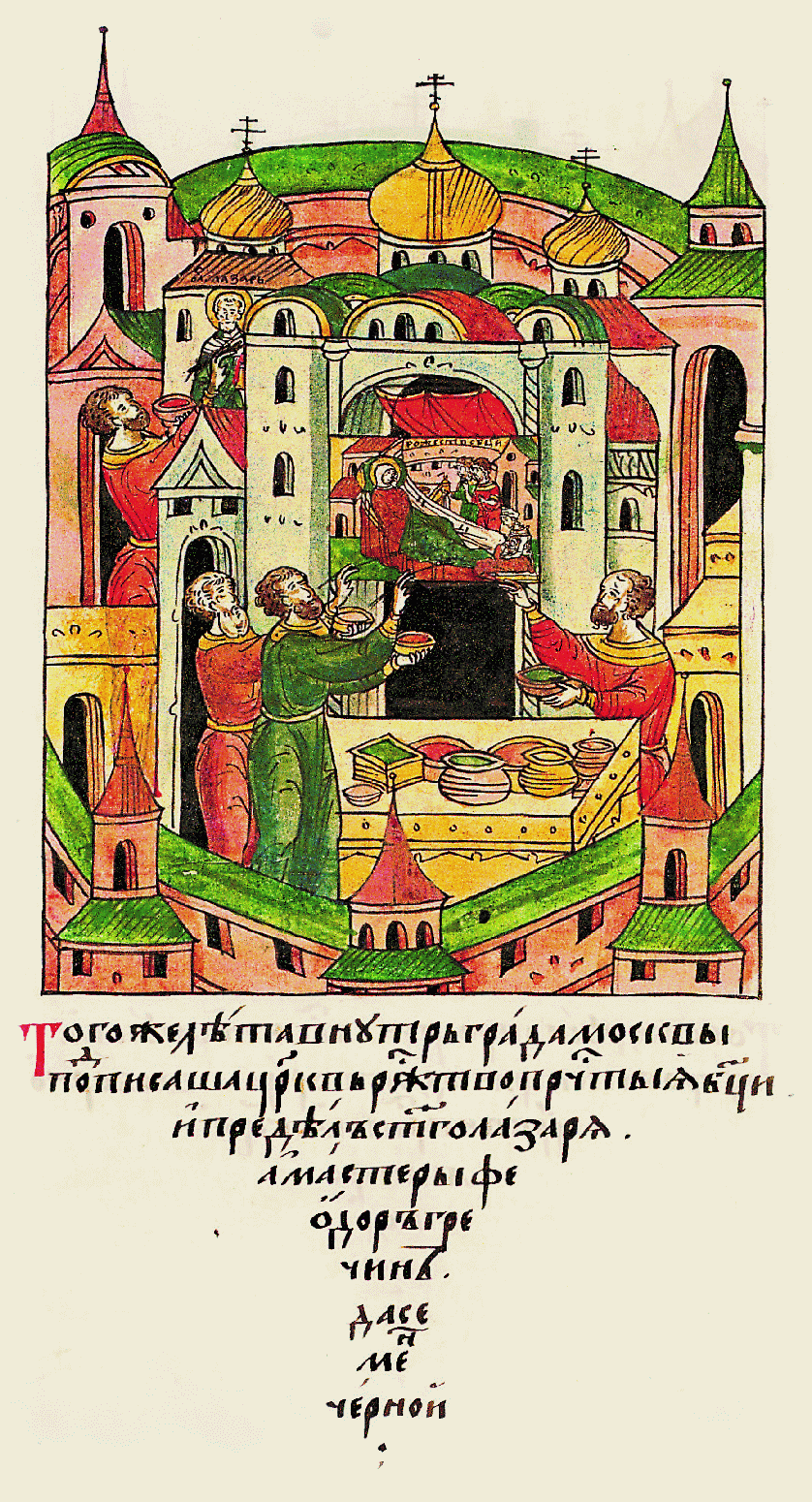
- Theophanes the Greek and Daniel Chorny paint the Nativity Church in the Kremlin, miniature from the Illustrated Chronicle of Ivan the Terrible (16th century)
- Born: c. 1330/1340; Constantinople, Byzantine Empire (now Turkey)
- Died: c. 1410
- Movement: Byzantine iconography

Theophanes the Greek (Russian: Феофан Грек, romanized: Feofan Grek; Greek: Θεοφάνης; c. 1330/1340 – c. 1410) was a Byzantine Greek artist, active mainly in Russia.

He greatly influenced the style of painting in Novgorod and Moscow in the 15th century. He is also known as being the teacher and mentor of Andrei Rublev, the greatest Russian icon painter of his time.

== Life and work ==
Theophanes was from Constantinople, the capital of the Byzantine Empire. According to a letter by Epiphanius the Wise, Theophanes painted churches in Constantinople, Chalcedon, Galata and Kaffa before moving to Russia. He moved to Novgorod in 1370. Early records mention several fresco cycles by him, but only a portion of one remains, located in the Church of the Transfiguration in Novgorod (1378). The surviving fragment stands as one of the finest examples of medieval Russian art and showcases his unique version of the Byzantine style that he brought to Russia.

His style is considered unsurpassed in expression achieved by almost mono-colored painting. Some of his contemporaries observed that he appeared to be "painting with a broom", in reference to the bold, broad execution in some of his finest frescos (see St. Makarios of Egypt), which are unique in the larger Byzantine tradition. His figures are strongly characterized, while his brushwork displays a sense of energy and expressiveness.

According to the letter by Epiphanius, Theophanes worked in Nizhny Novgorod. He then moved to Moscow in the early 1390s. One of his secular frescoes included a view of Moscow in the palace of Vladimir the Bold, the prince of Serpukhov, as well as an unidentified image in the palace of Vasily I of Moscow. Theophanes is also said to have decorated three churches. A series of nine large icons in the Cathedral of the Annunciation in the Kremlin are associated with him and were painted around 1405. The iconostasis is preserved in the cathedral that now stands. He is also said to have painted "a city with all its particulars" in that of the Cathedral of the Archangel.

Theophanes was described by the Muscovites as "learned in philosophy", a reflection on his broad education and erudition. A hint of this might be gathered from his panel icon of the Transfiguration of Jesus, where the arresting geometry and brilliance of the figure of Christ is balanced against the ordered disarray of the earthbound Apostles, strewn about doll-like in the uncreated Light of Mount Tabor. The balance of mathematical harmony in line and shape, wed to a master's use of an earthtone palette and precious gold leaf, evokes a spirituality that is immensely powerful, and speaks to the genius of this relatively unknown painter.

According to a contemporary source, Theophanes was also famous as a manuscript illuminator. There are no signed or documented works known, but several examples have been attributed to him based on style.

== Notable works ==
=== Frescos ===
Theophanes decorated in fresco the walls and ceilings of many churches including:

- Church of the Transfiguration on Ilin Street in Novgorod (1378)
- Nativity Church in the Kremlin (1395), together with Semyon Chyorny
- Archangel Cathedral of the Moscow Kremlin (1399)
- Cathedral of the Annunciation of the Moscow Kremlin (1405)

=== Icons ===
Although he created panel icons, works attributed to Theophanes have become a topic of intense academic debate based on historical evidence. Prior to this debate, he was traditionally considered the author of famous panel icons, notably:

- Our Lady of the Don (1380?)
- Dormition of the Virgin Mary (1392)
- The Virgin Mary and John the Baptist from the iconostasis of the Cathedral of the Annunciation in the Moscow Kremlin (1405?)
- The Transfiguration (1408)

== Gallery ==
=== Frescoes ===
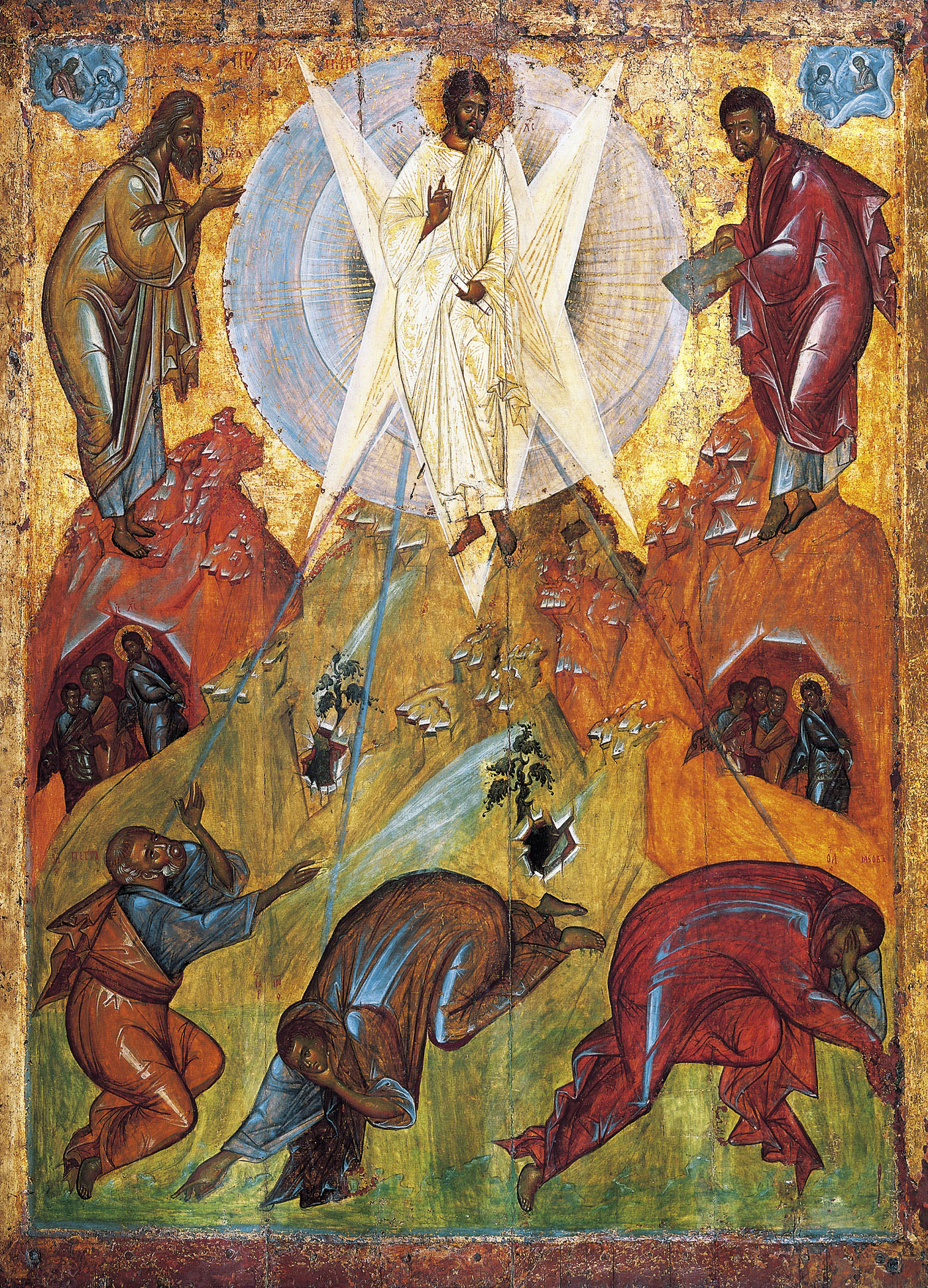
Transfiguration of Jesus 1408

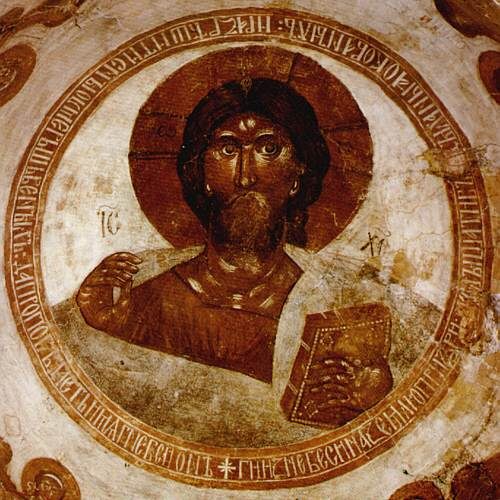
Christ Pantocrator

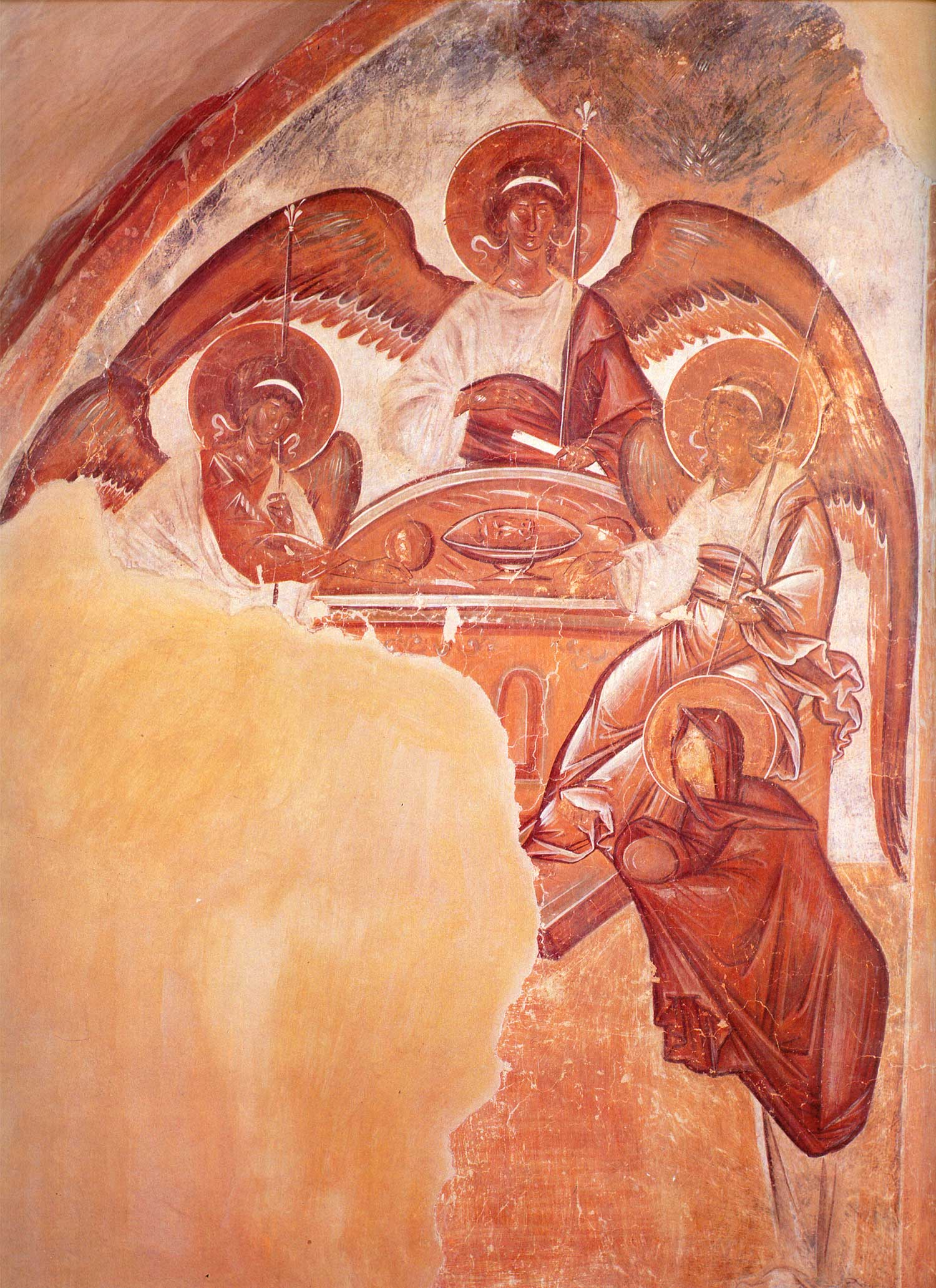
Trinity

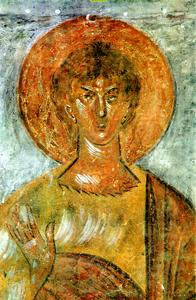
Abel

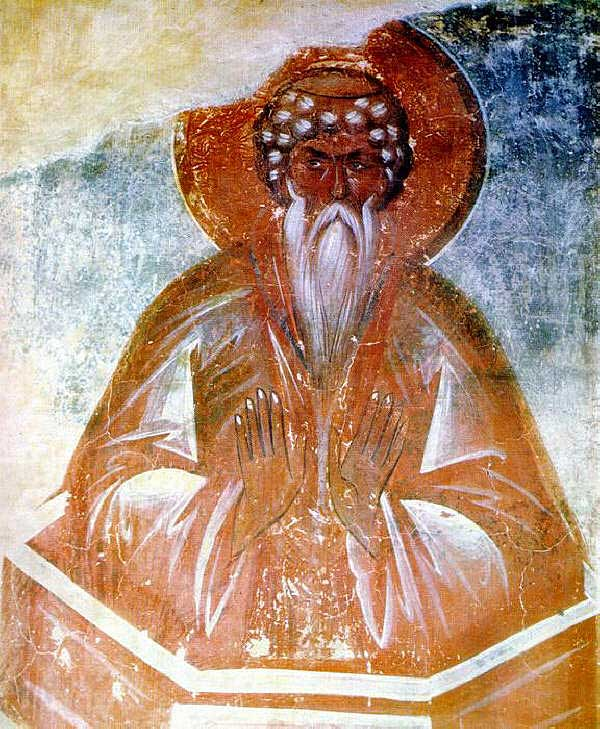
St. Daniel the Stylite

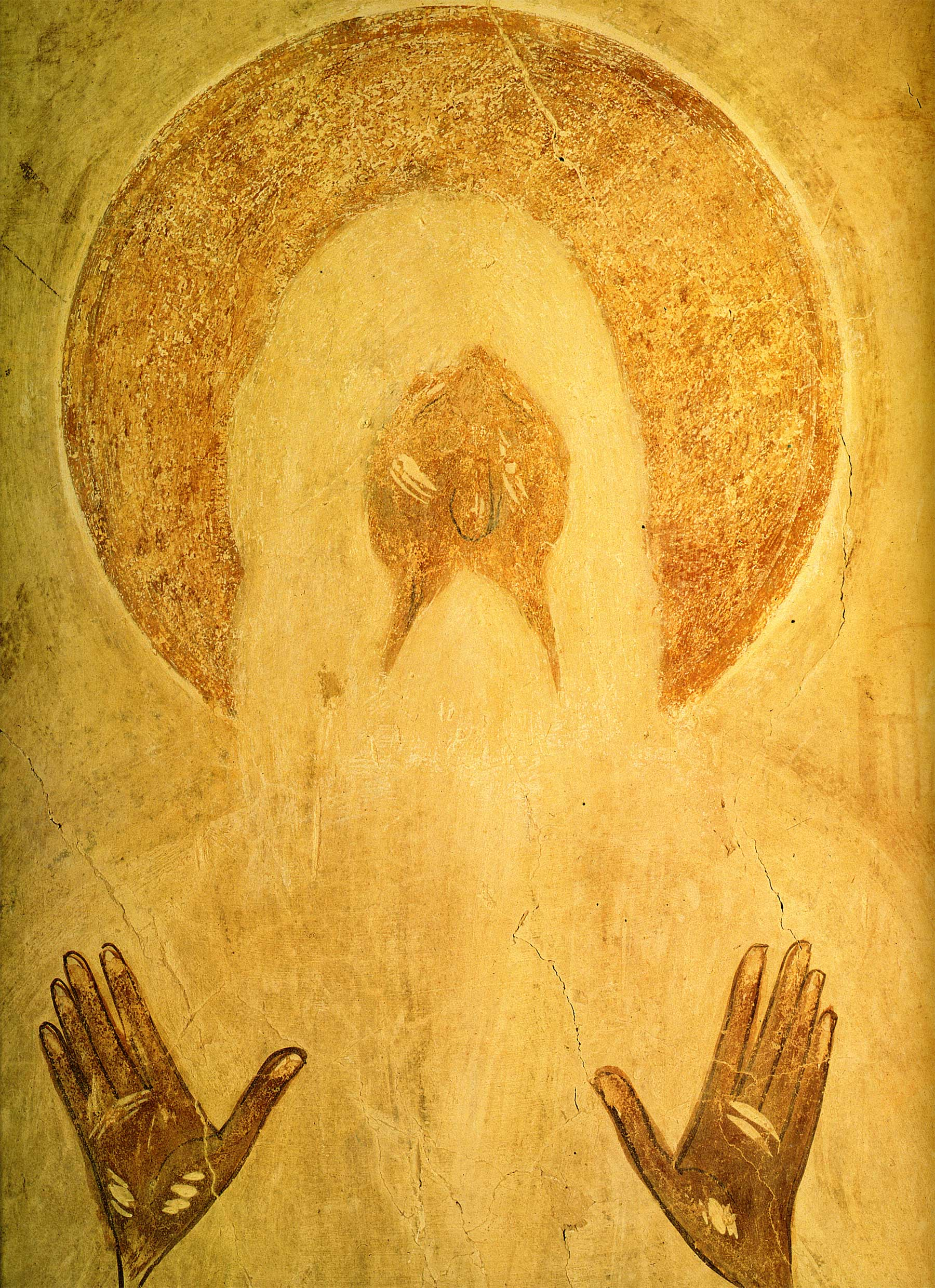
St. Macarius of Egypt

=== Icons ===
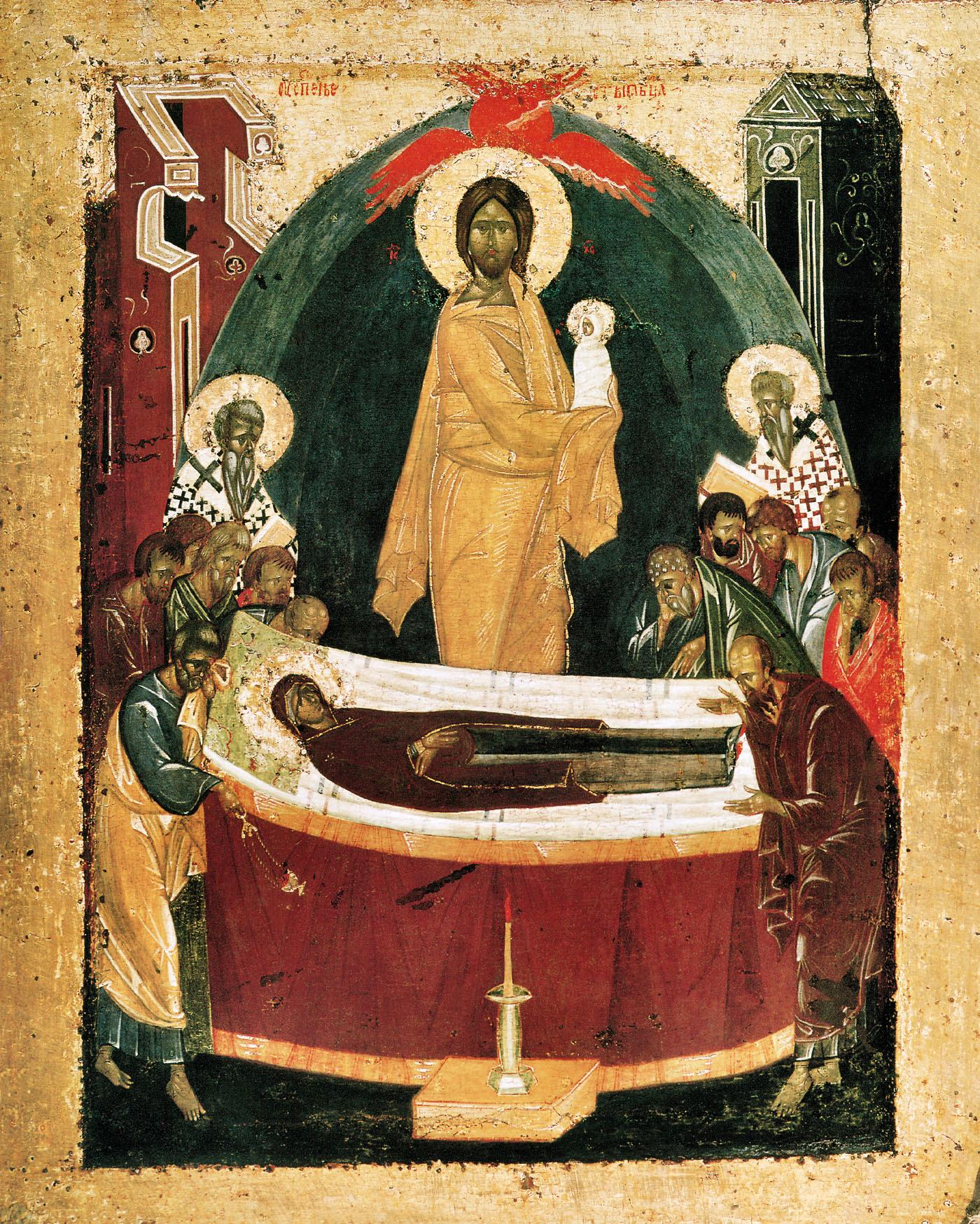
Dormition of the Theotokos (Uspenie Bogoroditsy)

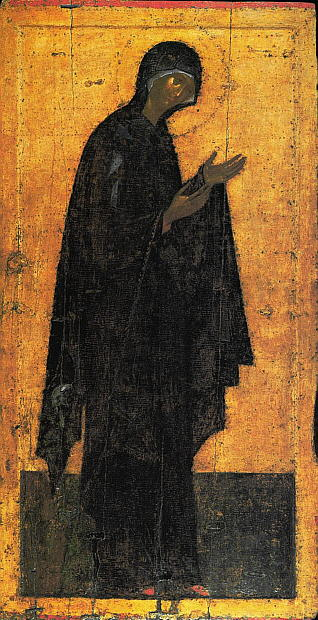
The Virgin Mary, Cathedral of the Annunciation in the Moscow Kremlin

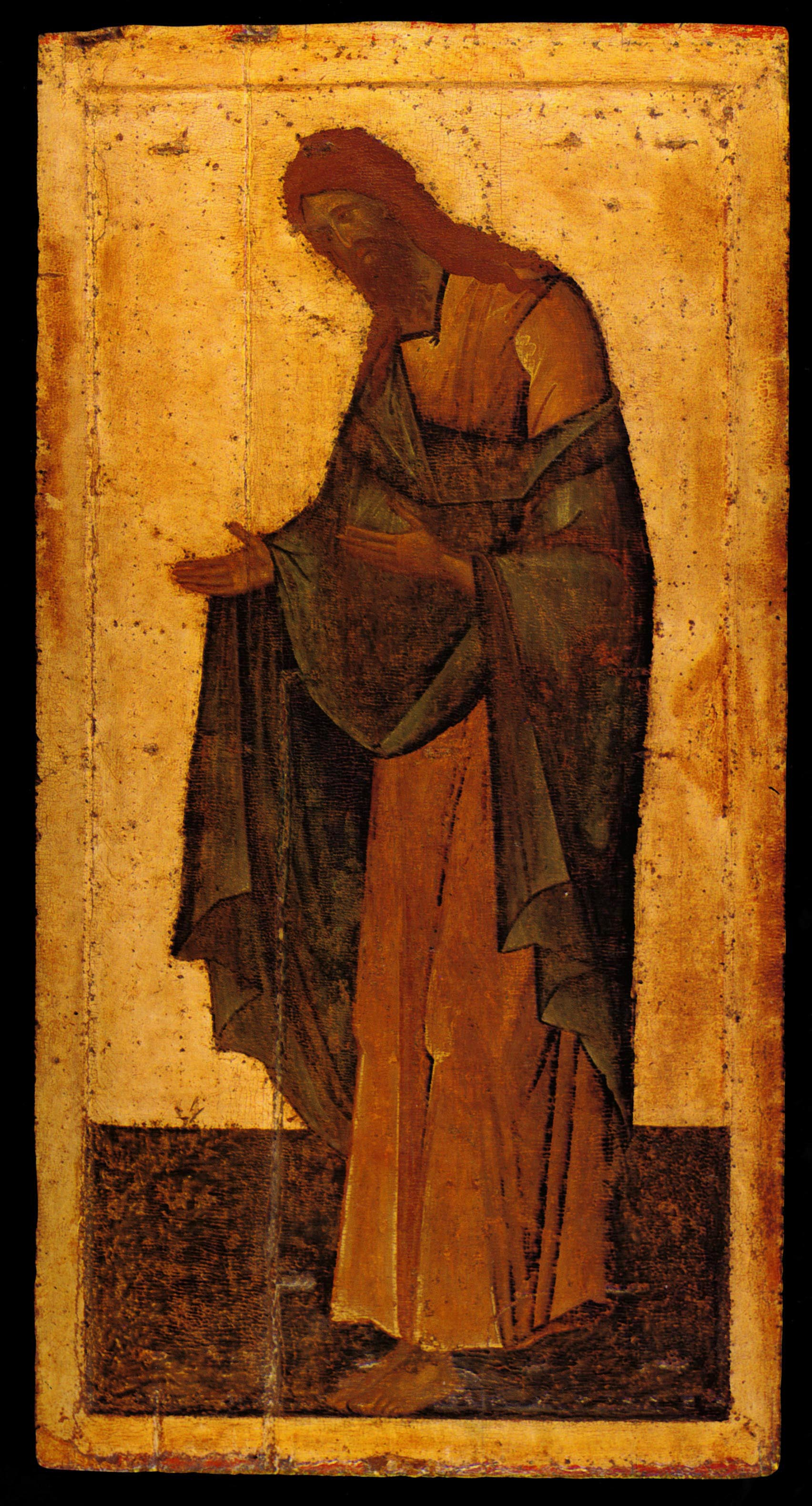
John the Baptist pair with the Virgin

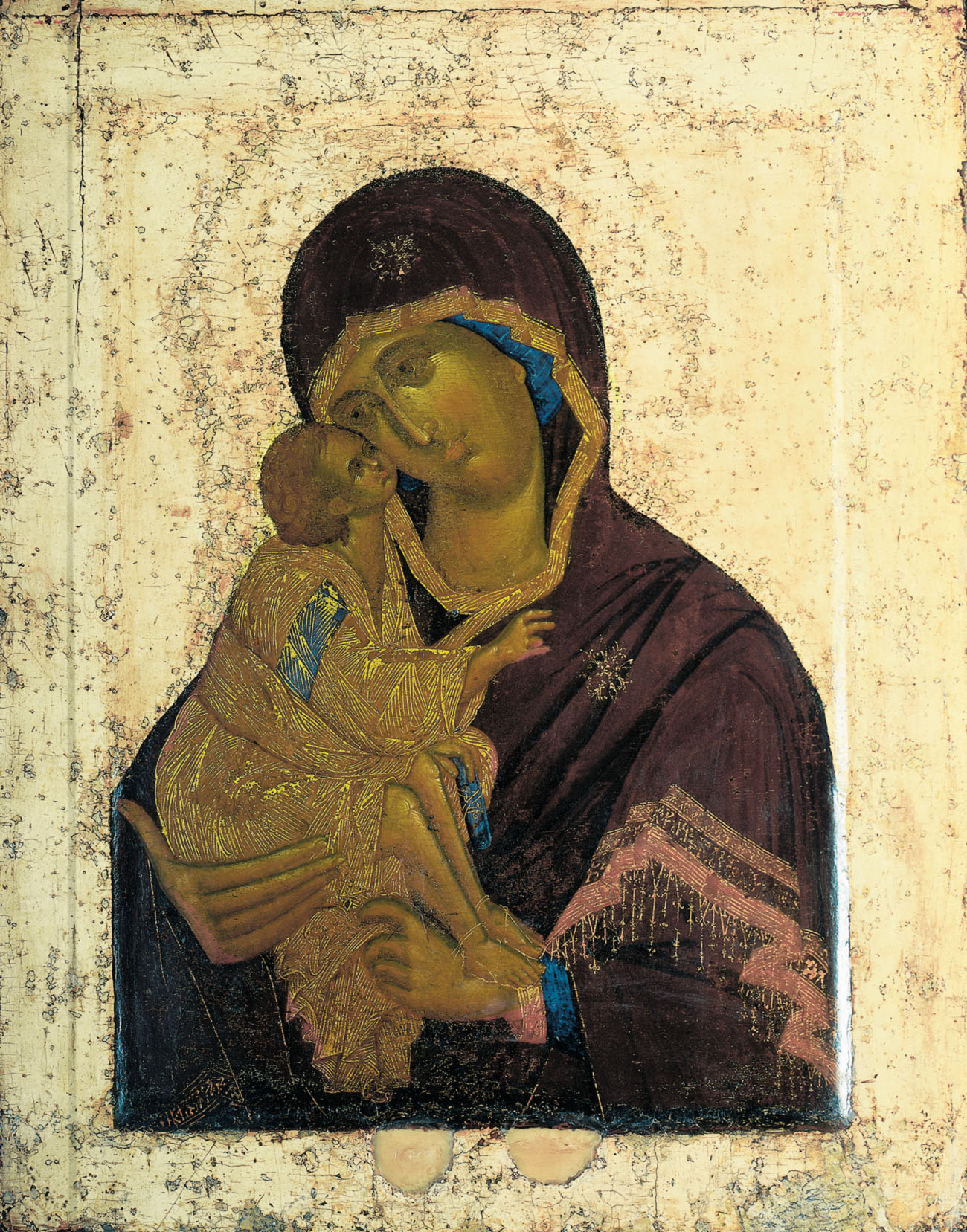
Our Lady of the Don

== See also ==
- List of Russian artists

== Sources ==
- Theophanes The Greek at the Encyclopædia Britannica
- Cutler, Anthony (1991). Kazhdan, Alexander (ed.). The Oxford Dictionary of Byzantium. Oxford University Press. p. 2064. ISBN 978-0-19-504652-6.
