= Prokhor =

- Gender: Male
- Language: Russian

Other names
- See also: Prochoros, Prochorus

Prokhor (Russian: Прохор) is a Russian given name derived from the Greek name Prochoros (Προχορος), which was the name of the saint. Its diminutive forms include Pronya, Pronka, Prokhorka, Prokha, Prosha, Proshka, and Proshenka. It produced patronymic surnames including Prokhin, Pronin, Proshkin, Prokhorov, and Prokhorenko.

Notable people with the given name include:

- Prokhor Chaliapin (born 1983), Russian singer, media personality and television presenter
- Prokhor Dubasov (1743–1823), Russian batman
- Prokhor of Gorodets, Russian icon painter
- Prokhor Poltapov (born 2003), Russian ice hockey player
