= Nativity Church in the Kremlin =

Church in Moscow, Russia

Church of the Nativity of the Virgin on Senya
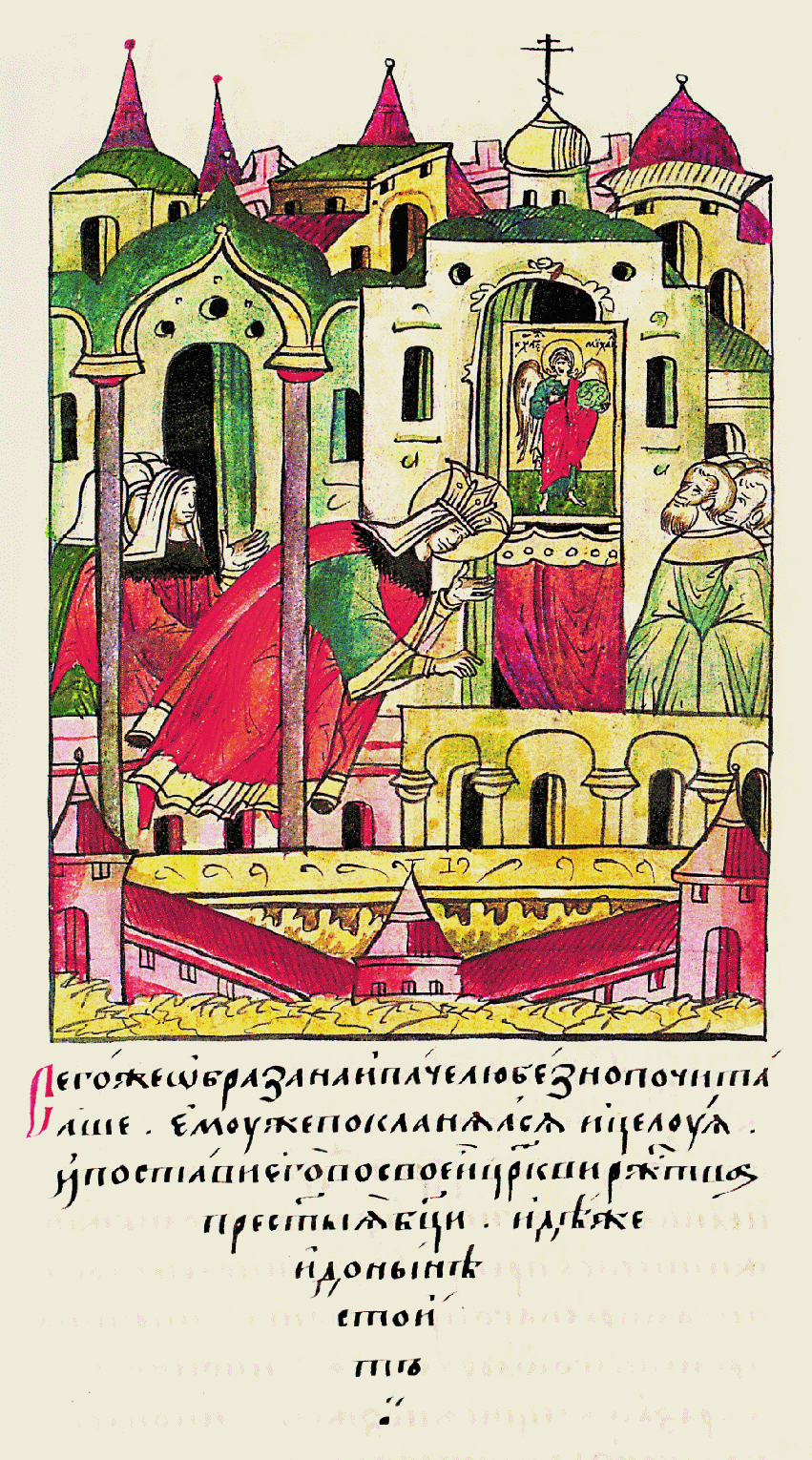
- Princess Eudoxia places the icon of an angel in the newly built church (Illustrated Chronicle of Ivan the Terrible)

Religion
- Affiliation: Eastern Orthodox
- Province: Moscow Oblast
- Leadership: Princess Evdokia Dmitriyevna
- Status: Closed

Location
- Location: Kremlin, Moscow, Russia
- Municipality: Moscow
- Interactive map of Church of the Nativity of the Virgin on Senya
- Coordinates: 55°45′02″N 37°36′58″E

Architecture
- Type: cross-domed church
- Completed: 1394

The Church of the Nativity of the Theotokos "na Senyakh" is the oldest surviving building in the Moscow Kremlin and the city of Moscow. It has been part of the Grand Kremlin Palace since the mid-19th century. The church cannot be visited. Only the underground floor of the Annunciation Cathedral goes back to the same period of the Middle Ages as this church.

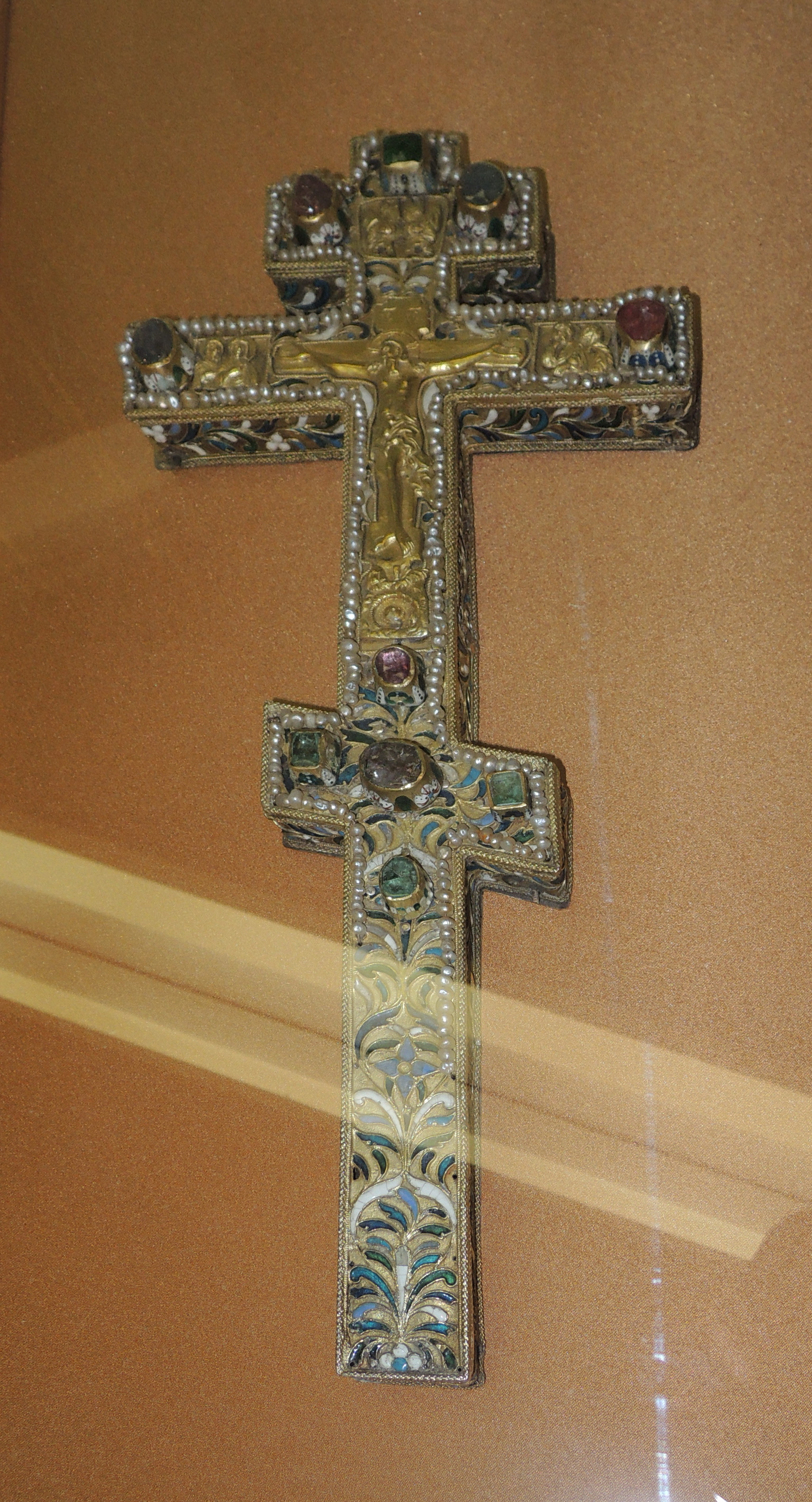
Wooden altar cross donated by Tsar Alexei Mikhailovich and Maria Miloslavskaya to the Church of the Nativity of the Virgin

The church was built in 1393 or 1394 by Princess Eudoxia of Moscow, the widow of Dmitry Donskoy. It adjoined the hall (seni) of the royal palace, hence its name "at the hall" (na senyakh).

N.N. Voronin believed that the temple was laid in memory of the Battle of Kulikovo, as it is dedicated to the feast of the Nativity of the Blessed Virgin Mary, which coincided with the date of the Battle of Kulikovo in the church calendar. However, S.V. Zagraevsky showed that there was a low probability of building a church on the 13th ("unhappy") anniversary of the battle.

The church took the place of the wooden church of the Resurrection of Lazarus and was located in the part of the princely palace reserved for women as a house church of the Grand Princess.

The church of 1393-1394 was preserved to half the height of the walls (before the choir) with the main portal and part of the windows. It was a four-pillared three-pagan church built of white stone. Round in plan, the western pillars carry a vaulted overlapping chorus. The architecture of the church combines the features of Vladimir-Suzdal (round pillars, framing of the portal, scapula) and early Moscow (the keeled end of the portal and niches, windows-rosettes) of architectural schools. In 1395 the church was painted by Theophanes and Symeon Black with his disciples.

In 1479, probably because of a fire, the top of the building collapsed, but soon the church was rebuilt. In 1514-1518 the architect Aloisio the New (Aleviz) rebuilt the church at the level of the residential tier of the palace in a new volume, which housed the main throne of the Nativity of the Virgin. The architect preserved the lower part of the ancient church as a podlet in which the chapel of Lazar was built, previously, apparently, located in the altar.

We can judge the appearance of the Aleviz church only from the blueprint "Kremlenagrad" of the early 1600s, where it is shown with three-headed, with three apses and two aisles (probably not before the second half of the 16th century).

Under Tsar Feodor Alekseevich in the years 1681-1684, the building was rebuilt and turned into a one-domed church with a rectangular altar and a refectory on the west side. The Saint Lazare chapel at the same time was abolished. In the 18th century. The podlet turned into a storage room. At the beginning of the construction of the Great Kremlin Palace, the upper part was again rebuilt, and in the ancient podlet the special church of the Resurrection of Lazarus was again constructed.

== Bibliography ==
- Воронин Н. Н. Зодчество Северо-Восточной Руси XII—XV вв. М., 1961—1962. Т. 2. С. 253—262.
- Памятники архитектуры Москвы. Кремль, Китай-город, центральные площади. М., 1982. С. 329—330.
