= Pronino =

Pronino Пронино
- Village
- Location within Vologda Oblast Location within Russia
- Coordinates: 60°03′N 46°20′E
- Country: Russia
- Region: Vologda Oblast
- District: Kichmengsko-Gorodetsky District
- Time zone: UTC+3:00

Pronino (Russian: Пронино) is a rural locality (a village) in Kichmegnskoye Rural Settlement, Kichmengsko-Gorodetsky District, Vologda Oblast, Russia. The population was 4 as of 2002.

== Geography ==
Pronino is located 35 km northeast of Kichmengsky Gorodok (the district's administrative centre) by road. Kilchenga is the nearest rural locality.
