= Yekaterina Prokhorova =

Russian entrepreneur (1779–1851)

Jekaterina Prochorova (1779-1851), was a Russian entrepreneur.

She was born to the Moscow merchant Nikifor Rodionovich Mokeev and married the merchant Vasily Ivanovich Prokhorov (1753-1815). When she was widowed in 1815, she took over the cotton textile industry of her late spouse. Her business belonged to the biggest in Moscow, which made her a leading figure in the cotton industry. In the 1830s and 1840s, her company was the leading in the trade, making her a millionaire. Her company was the leading in manufacturing shawls and textiles.
