= Vladimir Pronin =

Vladimir Pronin is the name of:

- Vladimir Pronin (footballer) (born 1973), Russian football player
- Vladimir Pronin (runner) (born 1969), Russian steeplechase runner, represented Russia at the 2000 Summer Olympics
- Vladimir Pronin (football coach) (1945 - 2007), Soviet football player and coach, in 1994 Russian Second League
- Vladimir Pronin (general) (born 1948), Russian militia colonel-general
