= Cathedral of the Annunciation, Moscow =

Annunciation Cathedral
- Благовещенский собор
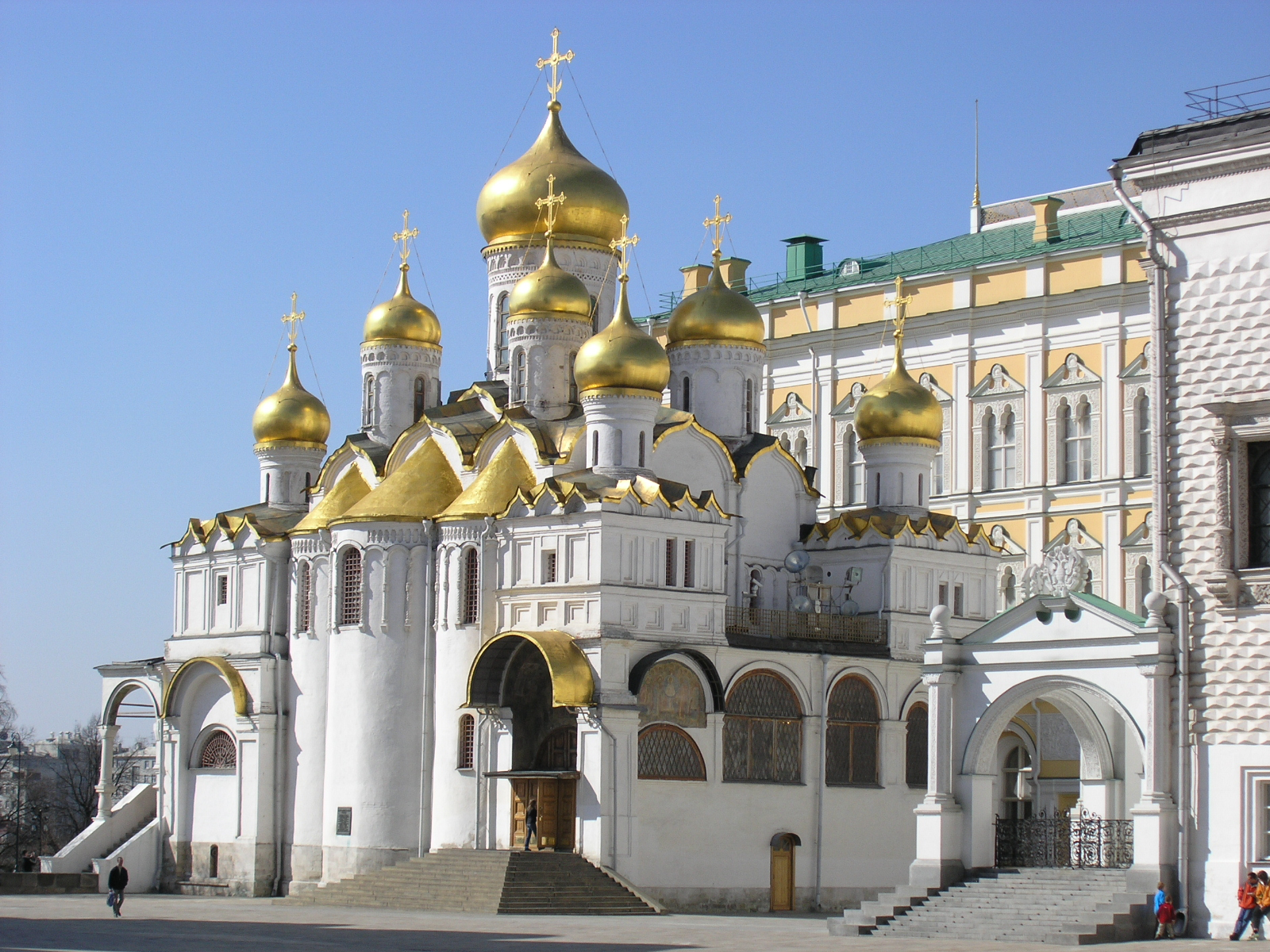
- Annunciation Cathedral of the Moscow Kremlin
- Annunciation Cathedral
- 55°45′00″N 37°37′01″E
- Location: Moscow
- Country: Russia
- Denomination: Russian Orthodox
- Website: http://www.kreml.ru/en/kremlin/buildings/Blagoveshenskiy/

History
- Consecrated: 1489

Architecture
- Architectural type: Russian
- Style: Russian

The Cathedral of the Annunciation (Russian: Благовещенский собор, romanized: Blagoveschensky sobor) in Moscow is a Russian Orthodox church dedicated to the Annunciation of the Theotokos. It is located on the southwest side of Cathedral Square in the Moscow Kremlin in Russia, where it connects directly to the main building of the complex of the Grand Kremlin Palace, adjacent to the Palace of Facets. It was originally the personal chapel for the tsars, and its abbot remained a personal confessor of the Russian royal family until the early 20th century. Now it also serves as a part of Moscow Kremlin Museums.

== History ==
The Cathedral of the Annunciation was built by architects from Pskov in 1484-1489 as part of Grand Duke Ivan III's plans for a large-scale renovation of the Moscow Kremlin.

Construction work began using the existing foundations in 1484 and was completed in August 1489. A number of the early 15th-century icons were re-used in the new building. After being badly damaged in a fire in 1547, the then Grand Duke (and subsequently first Russian Tsar) Ivan the Terrible began a restoration of the church, which was completed in 1564

Many of the church treasures were lost during the occupation of Moscow by the armies of the Polish–Lithuanian Commonwealth in 1612 at the close of the Time of Troubles. It was also damaged by the great Kremlin fire of 1737. During the French occupation of Moscow in 1812, the cathedral was used as a barracks and was mostly robbed. It was restored in 1815–1820. During the 1917 Russian Revolution, the cathedral was damaged during the fighting. Afterwards, it was closed by the Bolshevik regime. During the 1950s, along with the other surviving churches in the Moscow Kremlin, it was preserved as a museum. After 1992, occasional religious services resumed. The church building underwent a restoration in 2009.

From the time of Ivan the Terrible's coronation as tsar, the members of the royal family worshiped at the Annunciation Cathedral, got married and baptized their children there.

== Architecture ==
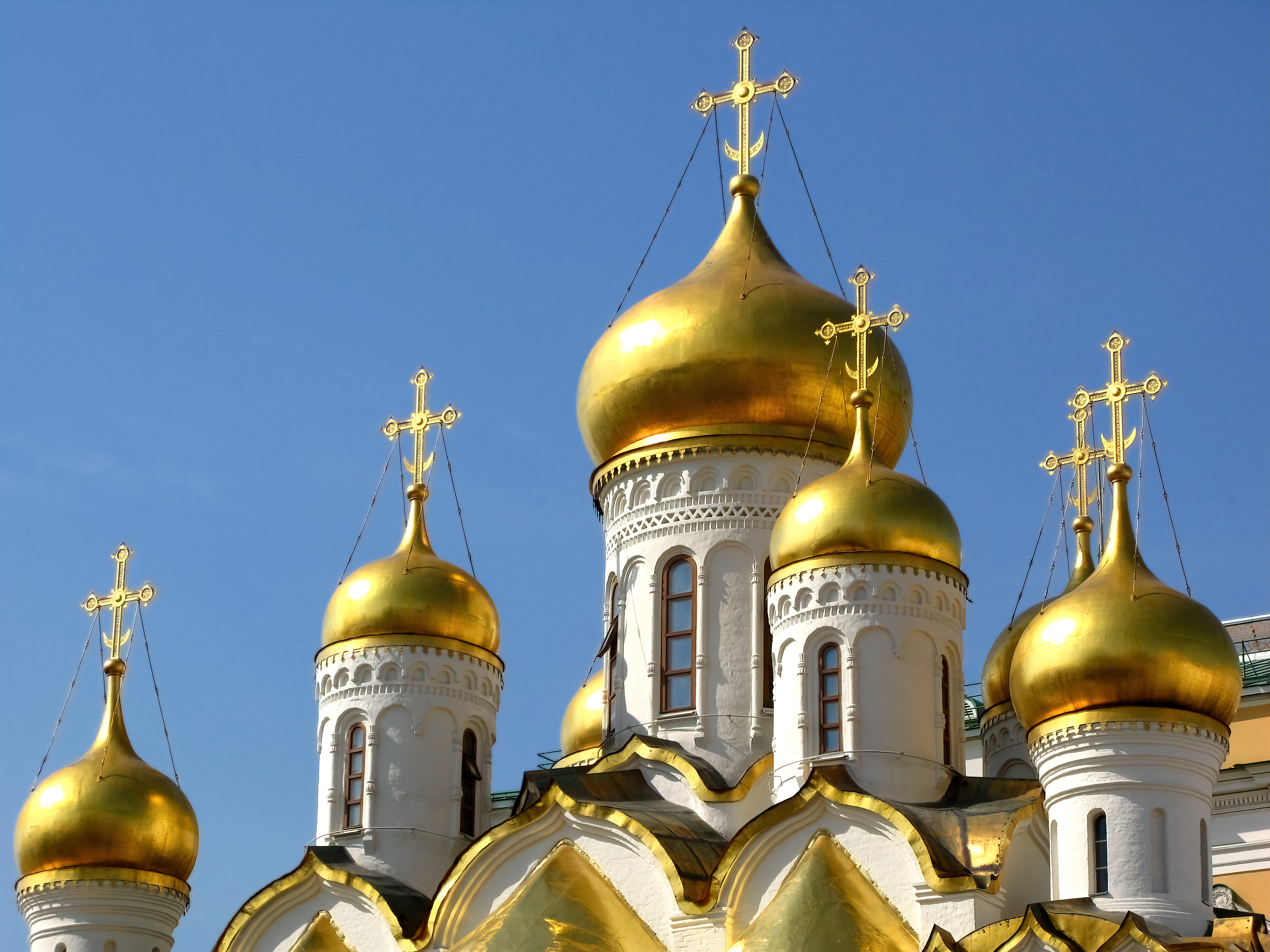
The gilded onion domes of the Annunciation Cathedral

Compared with the other two major Kremlin cathedrals, the Annunciation Cathedral has slightly smaller dimensions. The cathedral was built of brick, with facades of white limestone that are dressed and decorated.

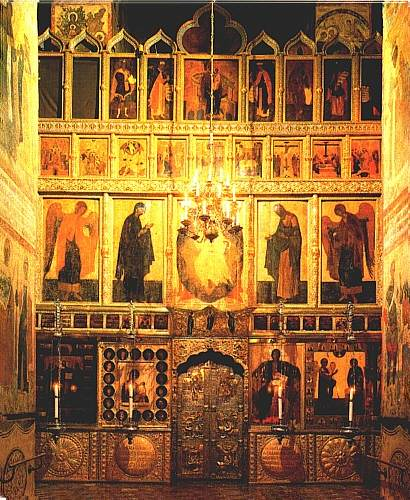
Iconostasis of the cathedral

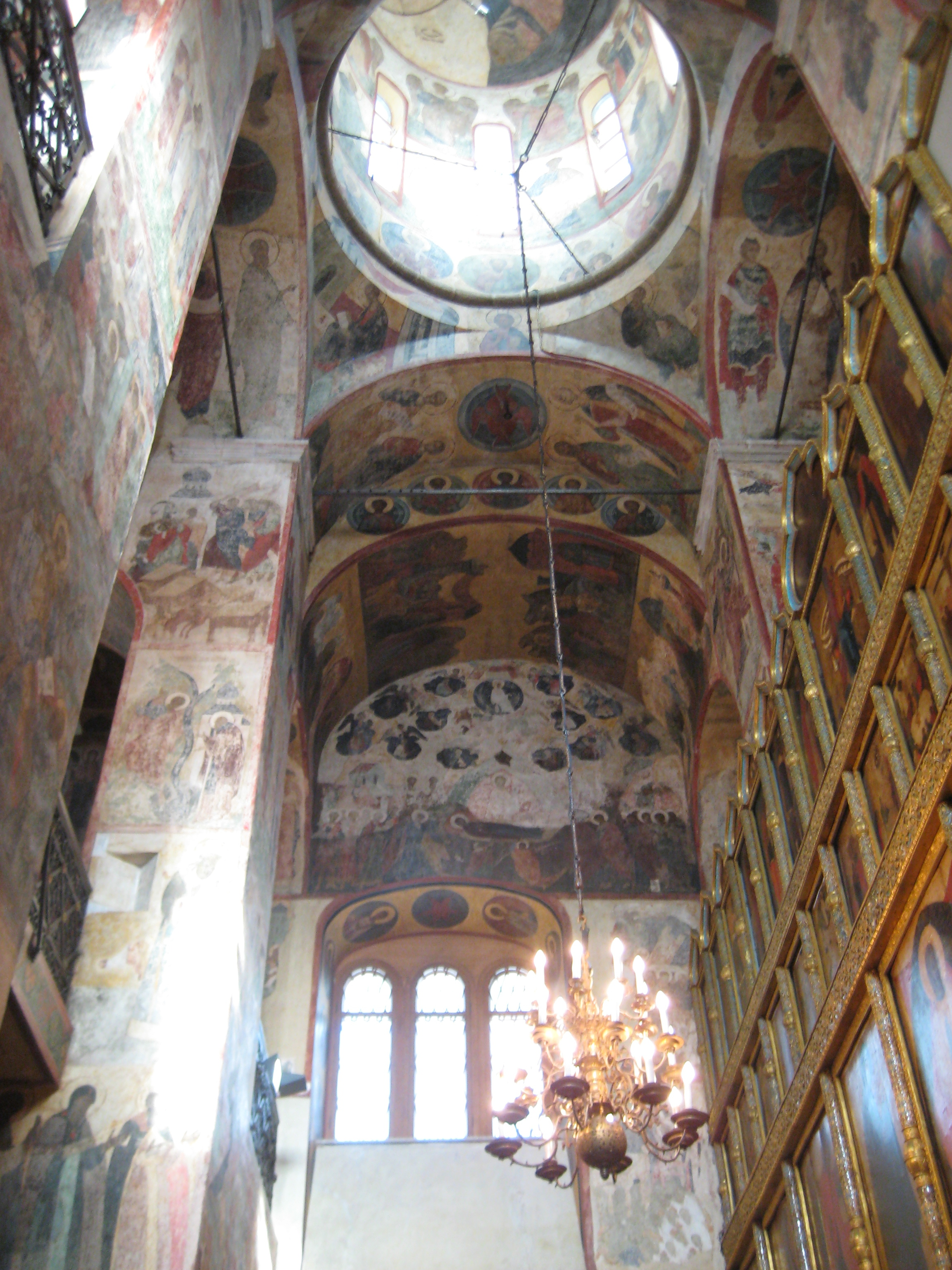
Interior of the cathedral

The interior of the cathedral consists of the central prayer area and several surrounding galleries, with the additions of side altars in the 16th century. The main vault of the cathedral has a large iconostasis, which includes icons of the 14th to 17th centuries, including the ones painted by Andrei Rublev, Theophanes the Greek and Prokhor, and 19th century, as well, particular on the middle tiers.

Throughout the interior, there are fragments of murals painted by Theodosius (1508) and by others (second half of the 16th, 17th and 19th centuries). Behind the altar (where once the sacristy was located) a large silver reliquary containing the remains are of about 50 saints from different places in the Middle East was discovered in 1894.
