= Andronicus =

Andronicus or Andronikos (Ancient Greek: Ἀνδρόνικος) is a classical Greek name. The name has the sense of "male victor, warrior". Its female counterpart is Andronikè (Ἀνδρονίκη). Notable bearers of the name include:

== People ==
- Andronicus of Olynthus, Greek general under Demetrius in the 4th century BC
- Livius Andronicus (c. 284 – c. 204 BC), Greco-Roman dramatist and epic poet who introduced drama to the Romans and produced the first formal play in Latin
- Andronicus ben Meshullam, Jewish scholar of the 2nd century BC
- Andronicus of Pergamum, 2nd-century BC diplomat
- Andronicus of Macedonia, Macedonian governor of Ephesus in 2nd century BC
- Andronicus of Cyrrhus (fl. c. 100 BC), Greek astronomer
- Andronicus of Rhodes (fl. c. 60 BC), Greek philosopher
- Andronicus of Pannonia (Saint Andronicus), Christian apostle of the seventy mentioned in Romans 16:7
- Andronicus (physician), Greek physician of the 2nd century
- Andronicus (poet), Greek writer of the 4th century
- Saint Andronicus, 4th-century Christian martyr
- Andronicus of Alexandria, soldier, martyr, saint and companion of Faustus, Abibus and Dionysius of Alexandria
- Coptic Pope Andronicus of Alexandria (reigned 616–622)
- Andronikos I Komnenos (c. 1118–1185), Byzantine emperor
  - Andronikos II Palaiologos (1258–1332)
  - Andronikos III Palaiologos (1297–1341)
  - Andronikos IV Palaiologos (1348–1385)
  - Andronikos V Palaiologos (c. 1400 – c. 1407), co-emperor with his father, John VII Palaiologos
- Andronikos Palaiologos (son of Manuel II) (1403–1429), Byzantine prince and governor
- Andronikos I of Trebizond (r. 1222–1235), emperor of Trebizond
  - Andronikos II of Trebizond (c. 1240 – c. 1266)
  - Andronikos III of Trebizond (c. 1310 – c. 1332)
- Andronicus of Veszprém, 13th-century Hungarian cleric
- Andronikos Euphorbenos (fl. 1105/8–1163), Byzantine aristocrat and military commander
- Andronikos Kakoullis (born 2001), Cypriot footballer

== Fictional characters ==
- Titus Andronicus, a play by William Shakespeare, possibly inspired by one of the above-listed emperors
- Andronicus, or the Unfortunate Politician, a 1646 satire by Thomas Fuller

== See also ==
- Andronikos Komnenos (disambiguation)
- Andronikos Palaiologos (disambiguation)
