= Saint Andronicus =

Saint Andronicus or Agios Andronikos may refer to:

- Andronicus of Pannonia, a 1st-century Christian mentioned by Paul in his Epistle to the Romans
- Andronicus, Probus, and Tarachus, martyrs of the Diocletian persecution (c. 304)
- Agios Andronikos (Yeşilköy), a village near Gialousa in Northern Cyprus
- Agios Andronikos, Trikomo (Topçuköy), a village in Northern Cyprus

== See also ==
- Andronikov Monastery of the Saviour, a former monastery in Moscow, Russia
- Andronicus, a given name
