= Andrei Rublev =

Russian artist (c. 1360 – c. 1430)

Saint Andrei Rublev
- An icon of Saint Rublev

Venerable Father (Prepodobne), Monk and Iconographer
- Born: c. 1360
- Died: c. 1430 (aged around 70); Andronikov Monastery, Moscow
- Venerated in: Eastern Orthodox Church
- Canonized: 6 June 1988, Trinity Lavra of St. Sergius by 1988 Local Council of the Russian Orthodox Church,
- Feast: 29 January, 13 June, 4 July, 6 July, 22 August
- Attributes: Clothed as an Orthodox monk, often shown holding an icon

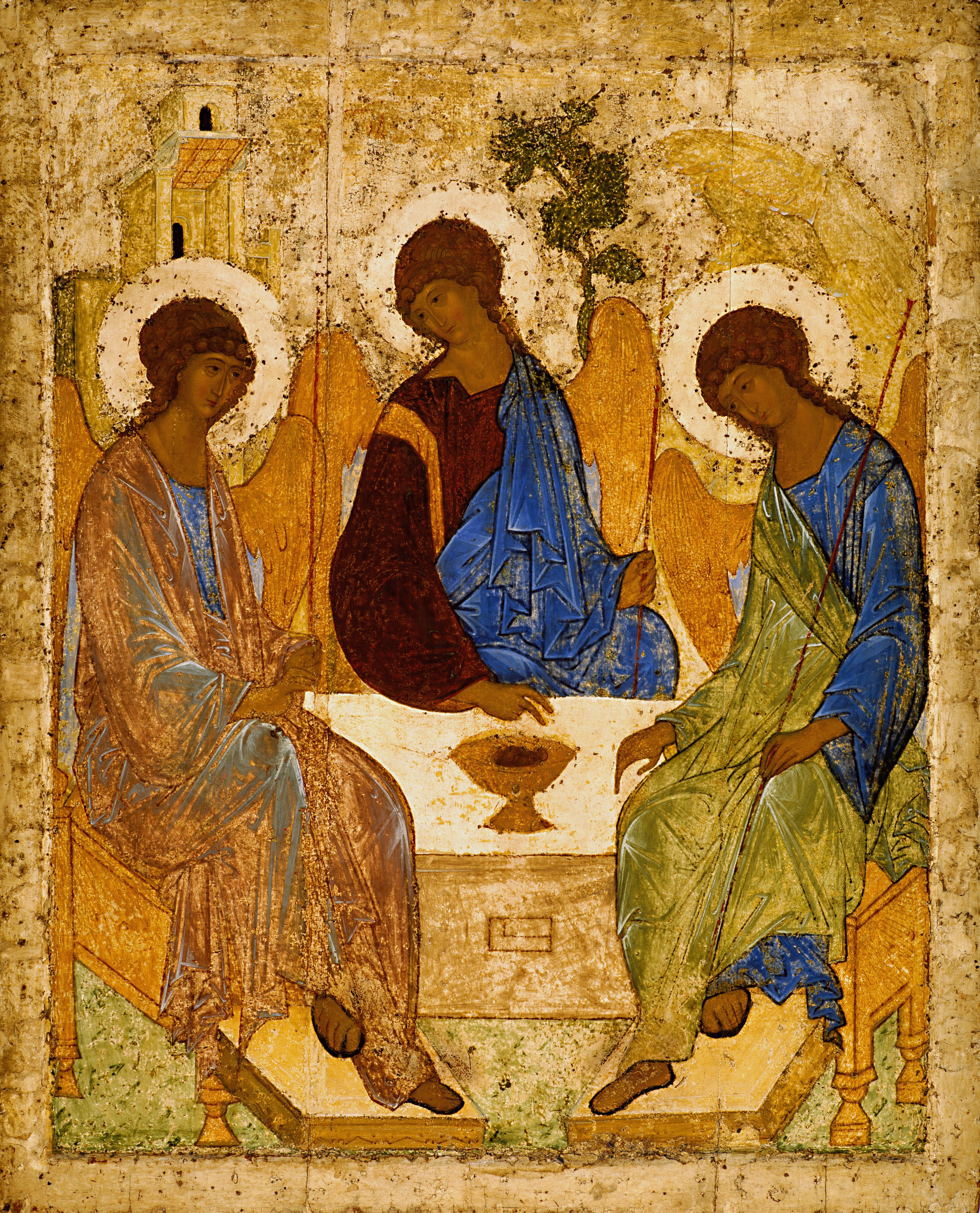
The Trinity by Rublev

Andrei Rublev (Russian: Андрей Рублёв, romanized: Andrey Rublyov, IPA: [ɐnˈdrʲej rʊˈblʲɵf]; c. 1360 – c. 1430) was a Russian artist considered to be one of the greatest medieval Russian painters of Orthodox Christian icons and frescoes. He is revered as a saint in the Eastern Orthodox Church, and his feast day is 29 January.

== Early life ==
Little information survives about his life; even where he was born is unknown. He probably lived in the Trinity Lavra of St. Sergius, near Moscow, under Nikon of Radonezh, who became hegumen after the death of Sergius of Radonezh in 1392. The first mention of Rublev is in 1405, when he decorated icons and frescos for the Cathedral of the Annunciation of the Moscow Kremlin, in company with Theophanes the Greek and Prokhor of Gorodets. His name was the last of the list of masters, as the junior both by rank and by age. Theophanes was an important Byzantine master, who moved to Russia and is considered to have trained Rublev.

== Career ==
Chronicles tell us that together with Daniel Chorny he painted the Dormition Cathedral, Vladimir in 1408 as well as the Trinity Cathedral in the Trinity Lavra of St. Sergius between 1425 and 1427. After Daniel's death, Andrei came to Moscow's Andronikov Monastery where he painted his last work, the frescoes of the Saviour Cathedral. He is also believed to have painted at least one of the miniatures in the Khitrovo Gospels.

The only work authenticated as entirely his is the icon of the Trinity (c. 1410). It is based on an earlier icon known as the "Hospitality of Abraham" (illustrating Genesis 18). Rublev removed the figures of Abraham and Sarah from the scene, and through a subtle use of composition and symbolism changed the subject to focus on the Mystery of the Trinity. On 22 June 2024, the icon was returned to the Holy Trinity Lavra of St. Sergius and installed to its original position on the iconostasis of Holy Trinity Cathedral.

In Rublev's art two traditions are combined: the highest asceticism and the classic harmony of Byzantine mannerism. The characters of his paintings are always peaceful and calm. After some time his art came to be perceived as the ideal of Eastern Church painting and of Orthodox iconography.

== Death and legacy ==
Rublev died at Andronikov Monastery between 1427 and 1430. Rublev's work influenced many artists including Dionisy. The Stoglavi Sobor (1551) promulgated Rublev's icon style as a model for church painting. Since 1959, the Andrei Rublev Museum at the Andronikov Monastery has displayed his and related art.

The Russian Orthodox Church canonized Rublev as a saint in 1988, celebrating his feast day on 29 January and/or on 4 July.

In 1966, Andrei Tarkovsky made a film Andrei Rublev, loosely based on the artist's life. This became the first (and perhaps only) film produced in the Soviet era to treat the artist as a world-historic figure and Christianity as an axiom of Russia's historical identity, during a turbulent period in the history of Russia.

Historian Serge Aleksandrovich Zenkovsky wrote that the names of Andrei Rublev, Epiphanius the Wise, Sergius of Radonezh and Stephen of Perm "signify the Russian spiritual and cultural revival of the late fourteenth and early fifteenth centuries". He also wrote: "The wonderful icons and frescoes of Andrey Rublev offered a harmonious and colorful expression of the spirit of complete serenity and humility. For the Russian people these icons became the finest achievement of religious art and the highest expression of Russian spirituality".

== Veneration ==
- 29 January – commemoration of his death anniversary (Greek Orthodox Church)
- 12/13 June – feast day, Synaxis of All of Andronikov Monastery (with Andronicus, Sabbas, Alexander, Abbots of Moscow and Daniel the Black, the icon painter)
- 4 July – main feast day from the list of "Russian saints of Moscow and Vladimir" by Nikodim (Kononov)
- 6 July – Synaxis of All Saints of Radonezh
- Synaxis of all saints of Moscow – a movable holiday on the Sunday before 26 August (ROC)

== Selected works ==
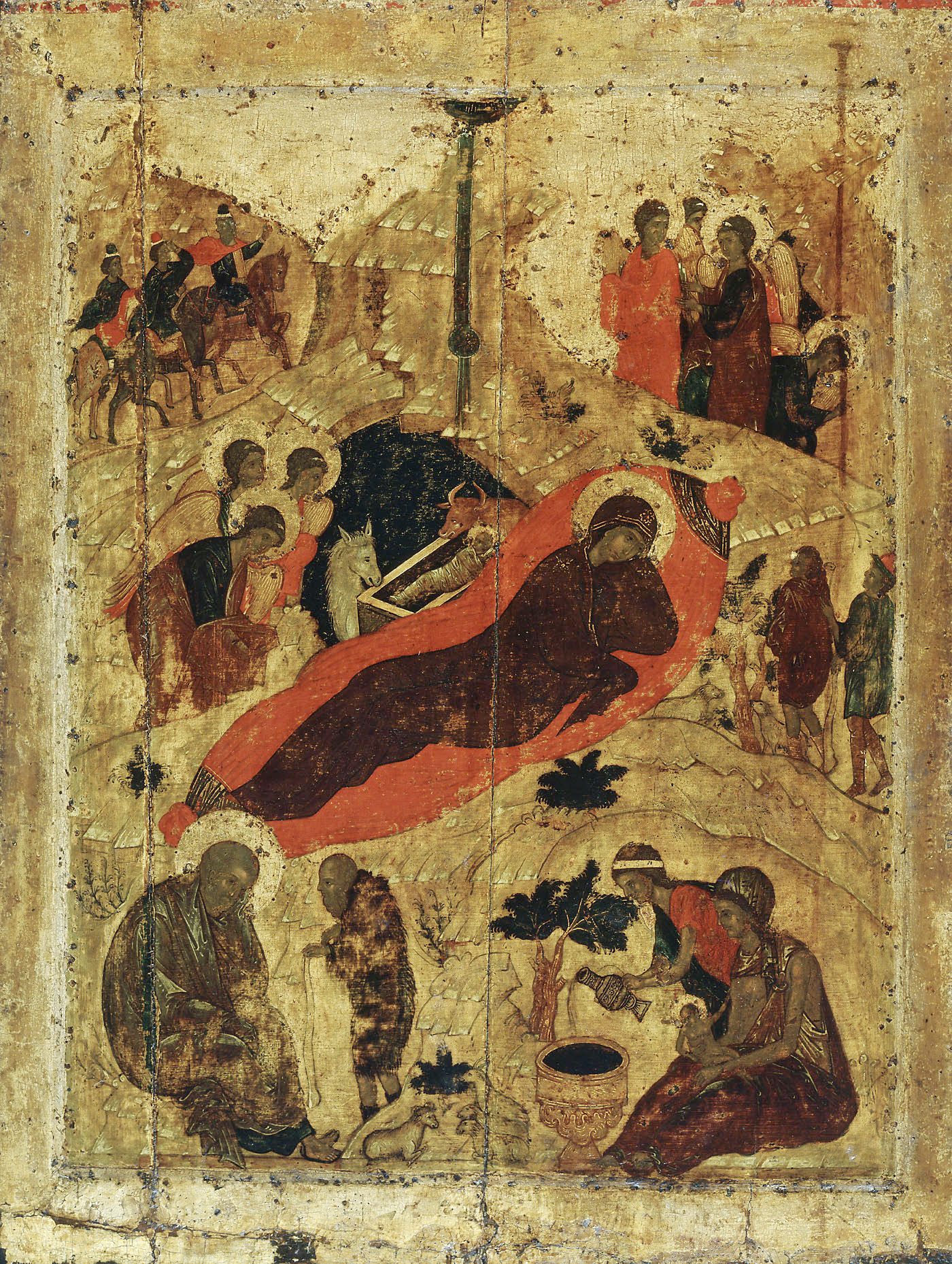
Nativity of Jesus, 1405 (Cathedral of the Annunciation, Moscow Kremlin)

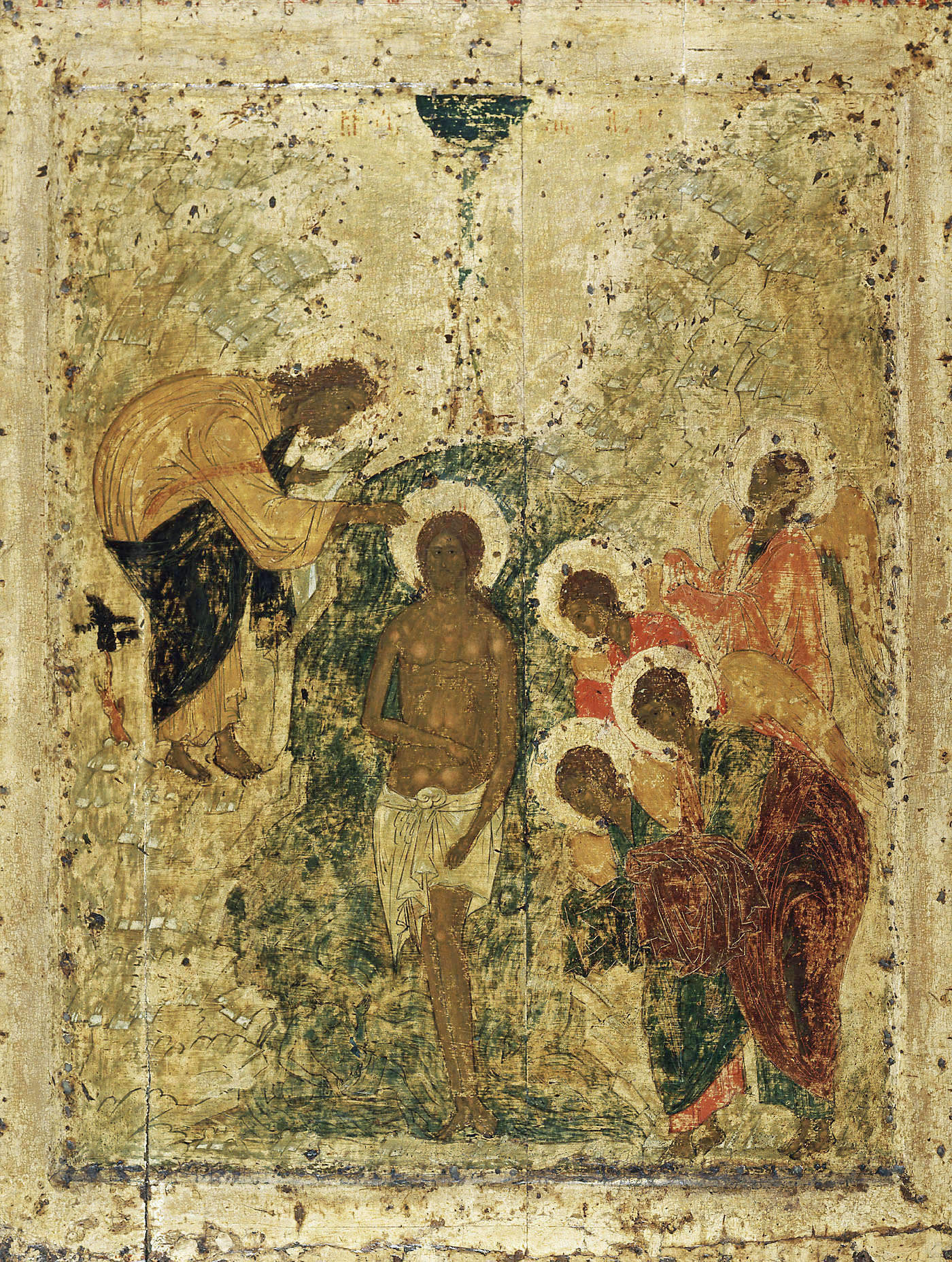
Baptism of Jesus, 1405 (Cathedral of the Annunciation, Moscow)

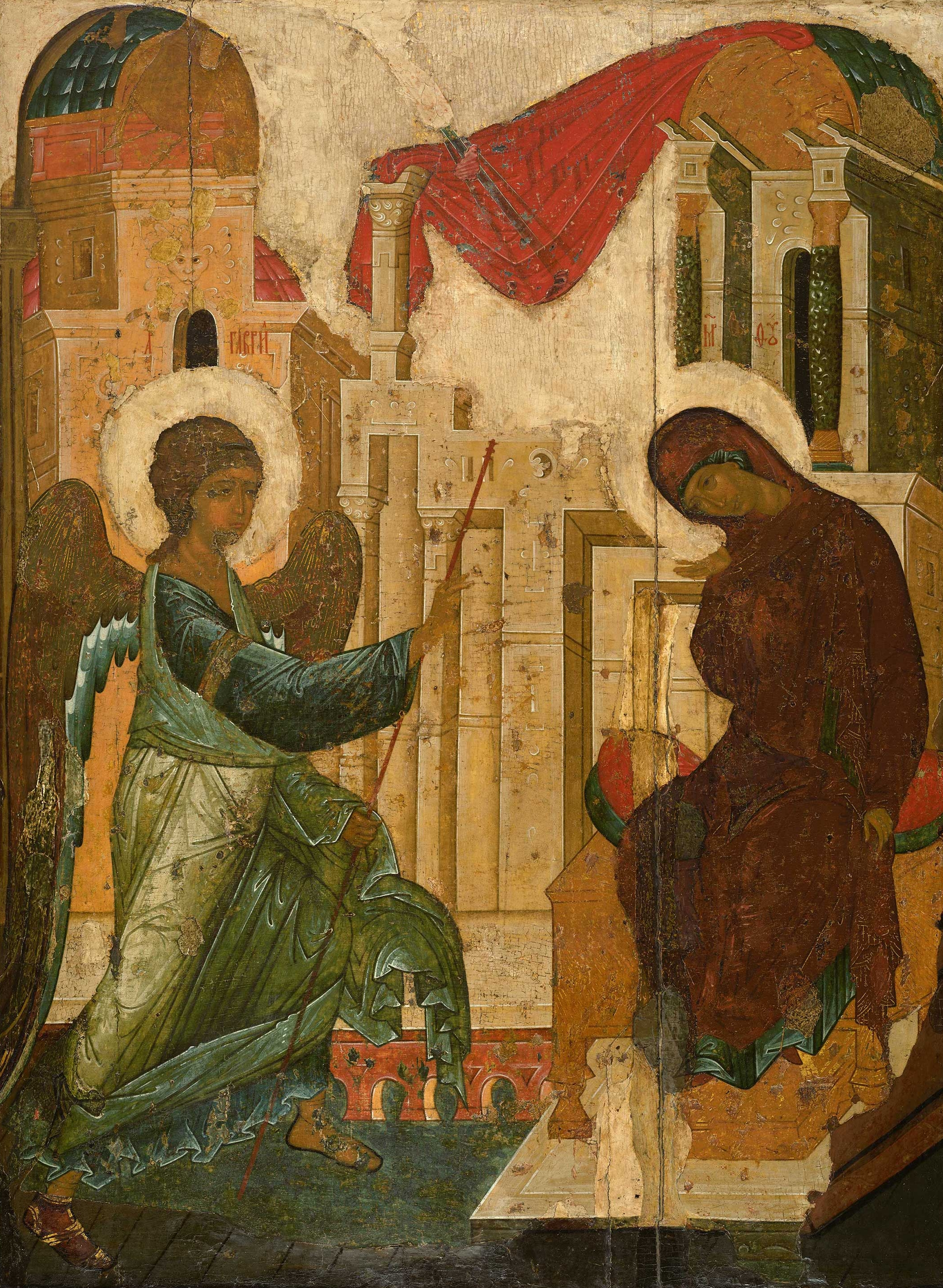
Annunciation, 1405 (Cathedral of the Annunciation, Moscow)

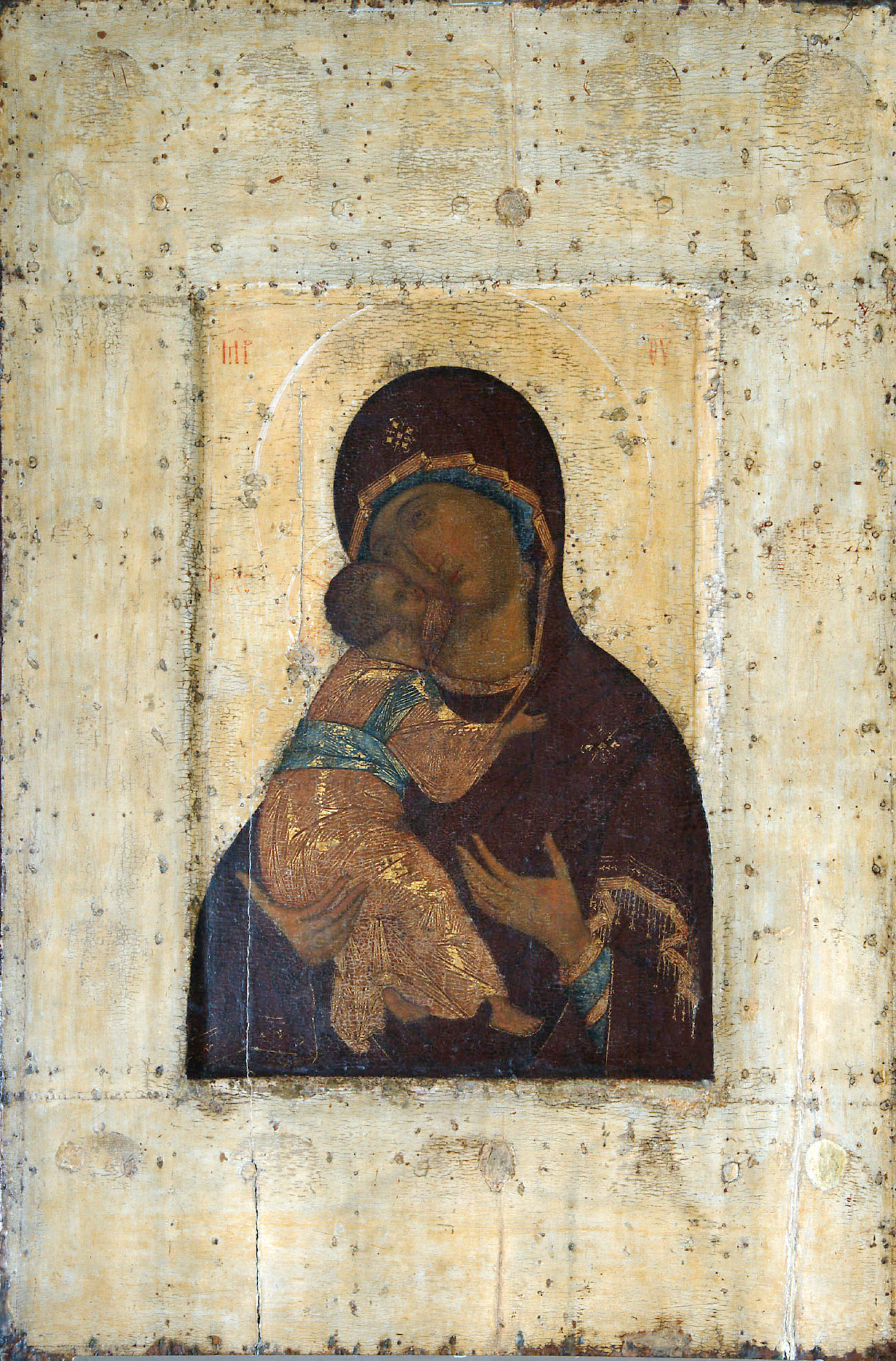
Version of the Theotokos of Vladimir, c. 1405

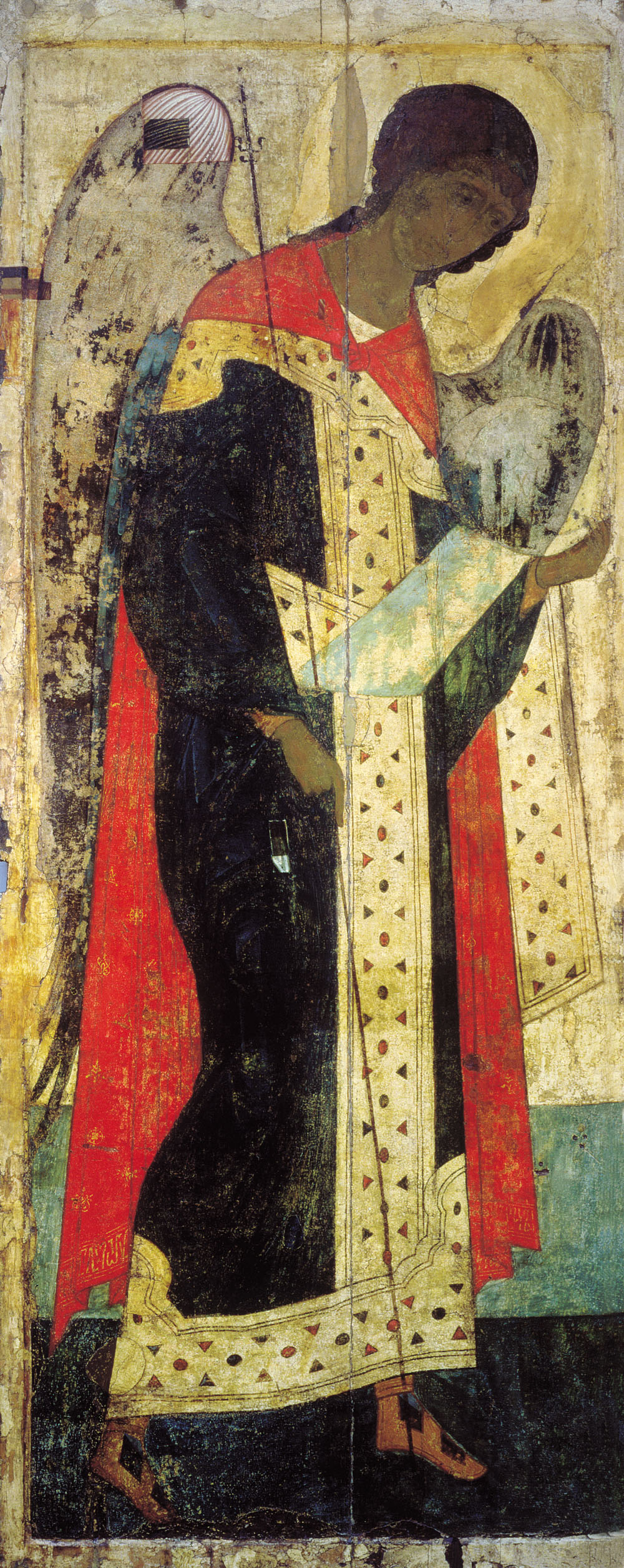
St. Michael, 1408 (Iconostasis at Dormition Cathedral, Vladimir)

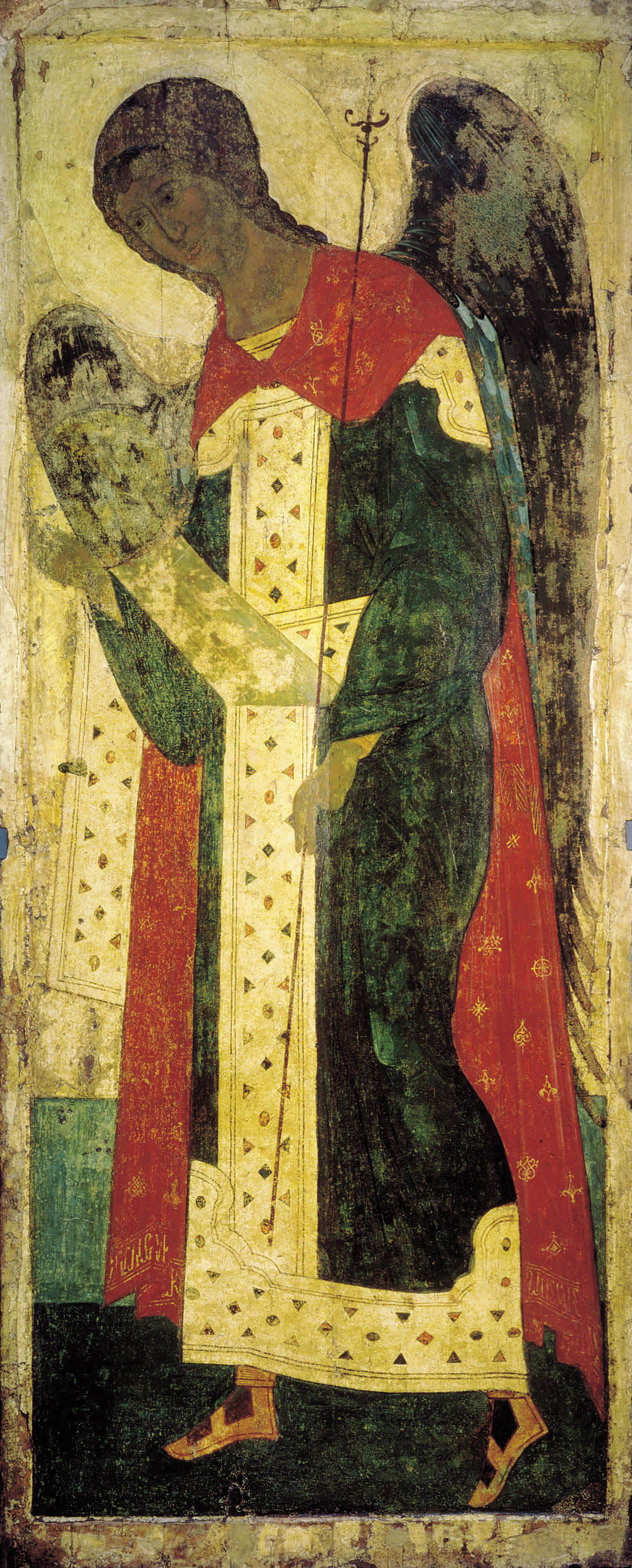
St. Gabriel, 1408 (Dormition Cathedral, Vladimir)

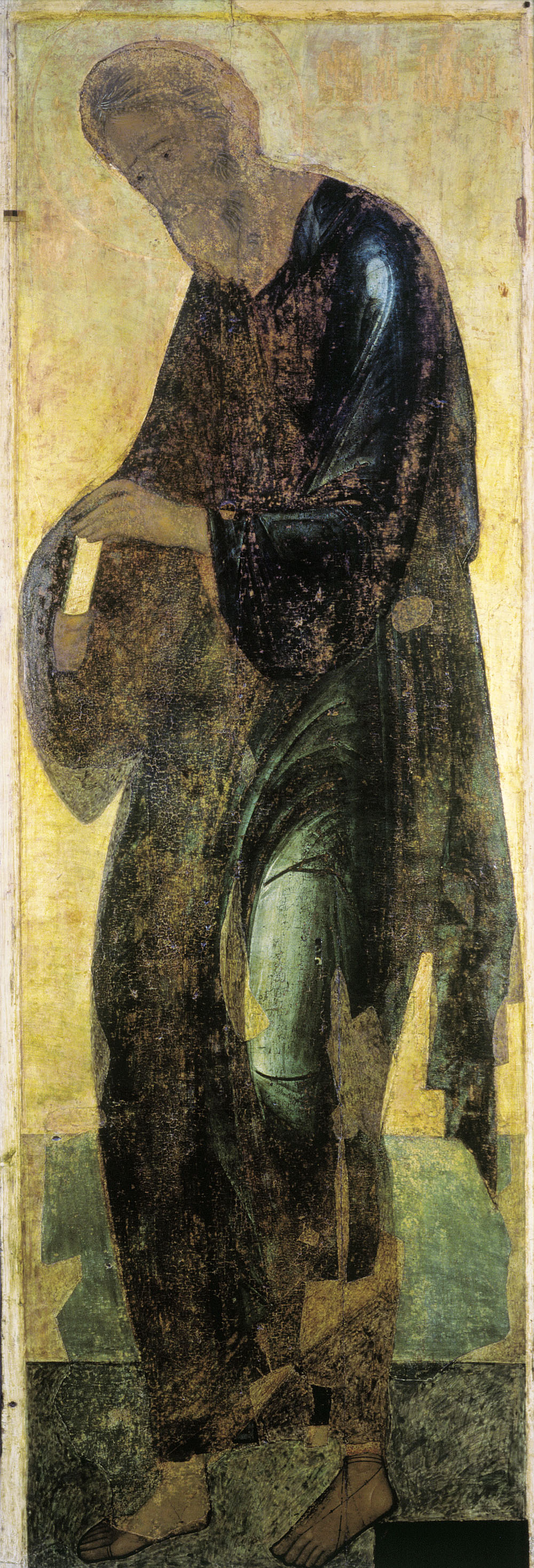
St. Andrew the First-called, 1408 (Dormition Cathedral, Vladimir)

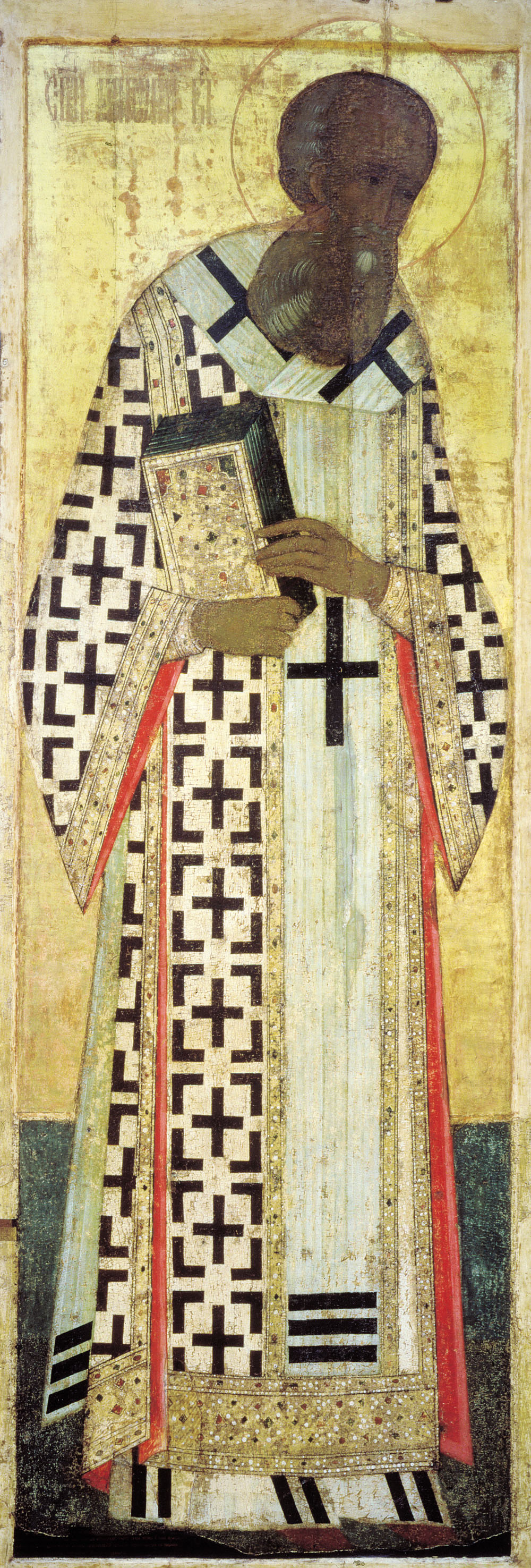
St. Gregory the Theologian, 1408 (Dormition Cathedral, Vladimir)

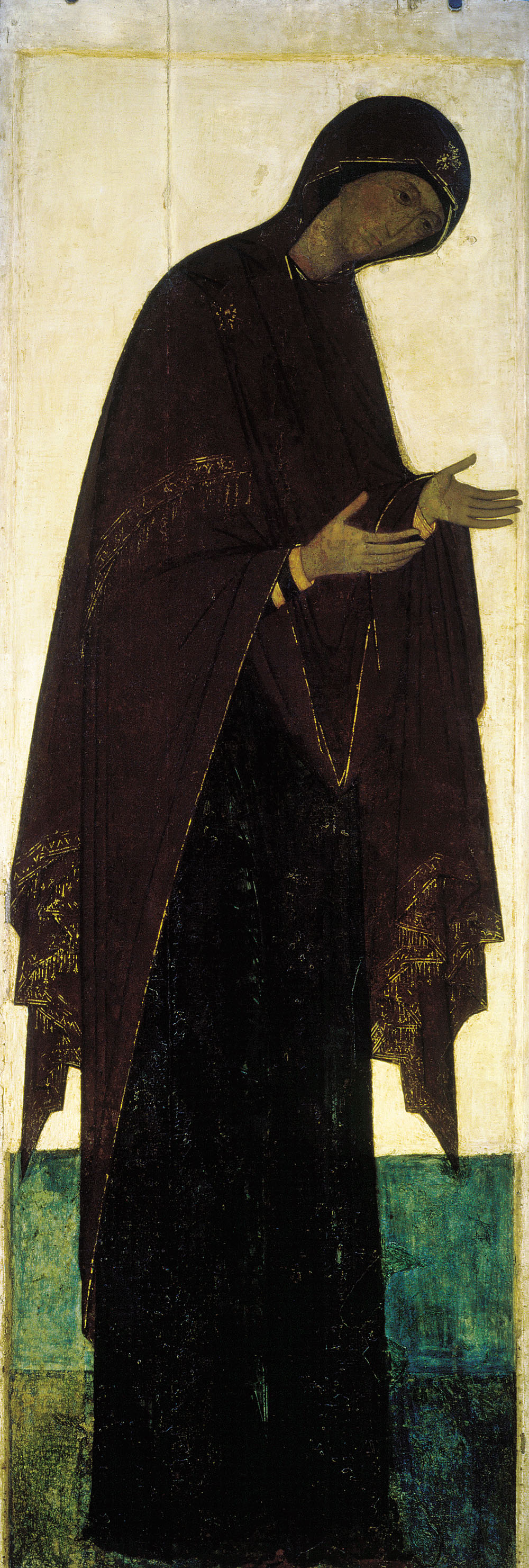
Theotokos from Deësis, 1408 (Dormition Cathedral, Vladimir) Some think this may be the work of Theophanes the Greek

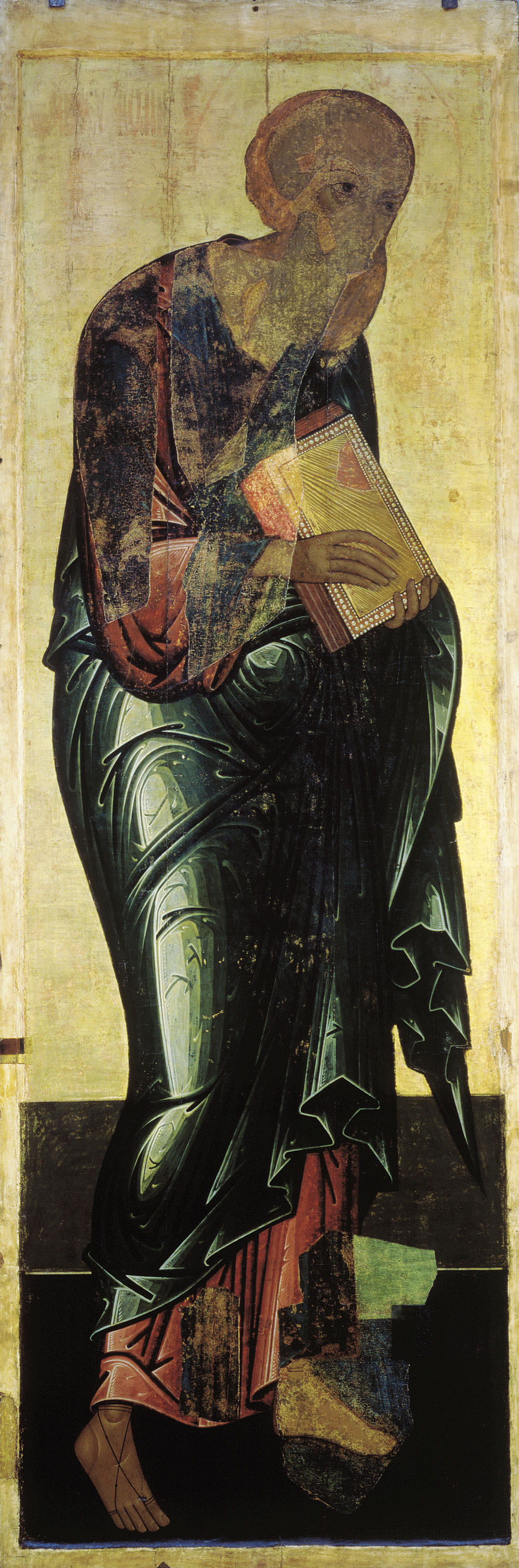
St. John the Theologian, 1408 (Dormition Cathedral, Vladimir)

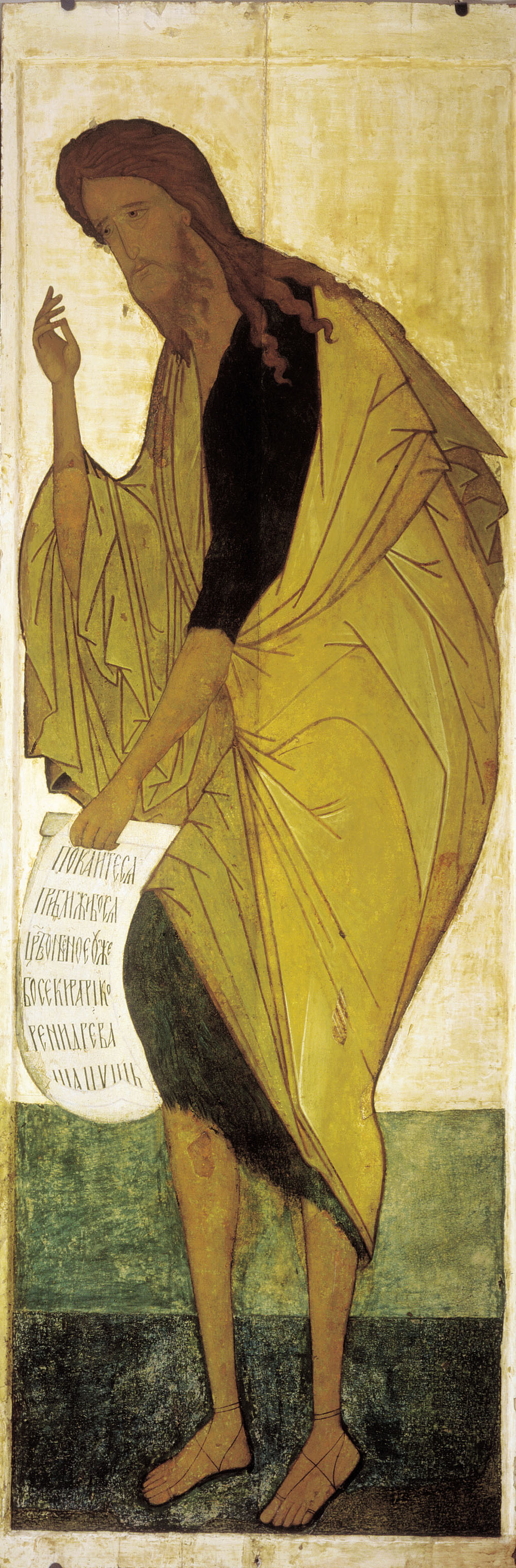
St. John the Baptist, 1408 (Dormition Cathedral, Vladimir)

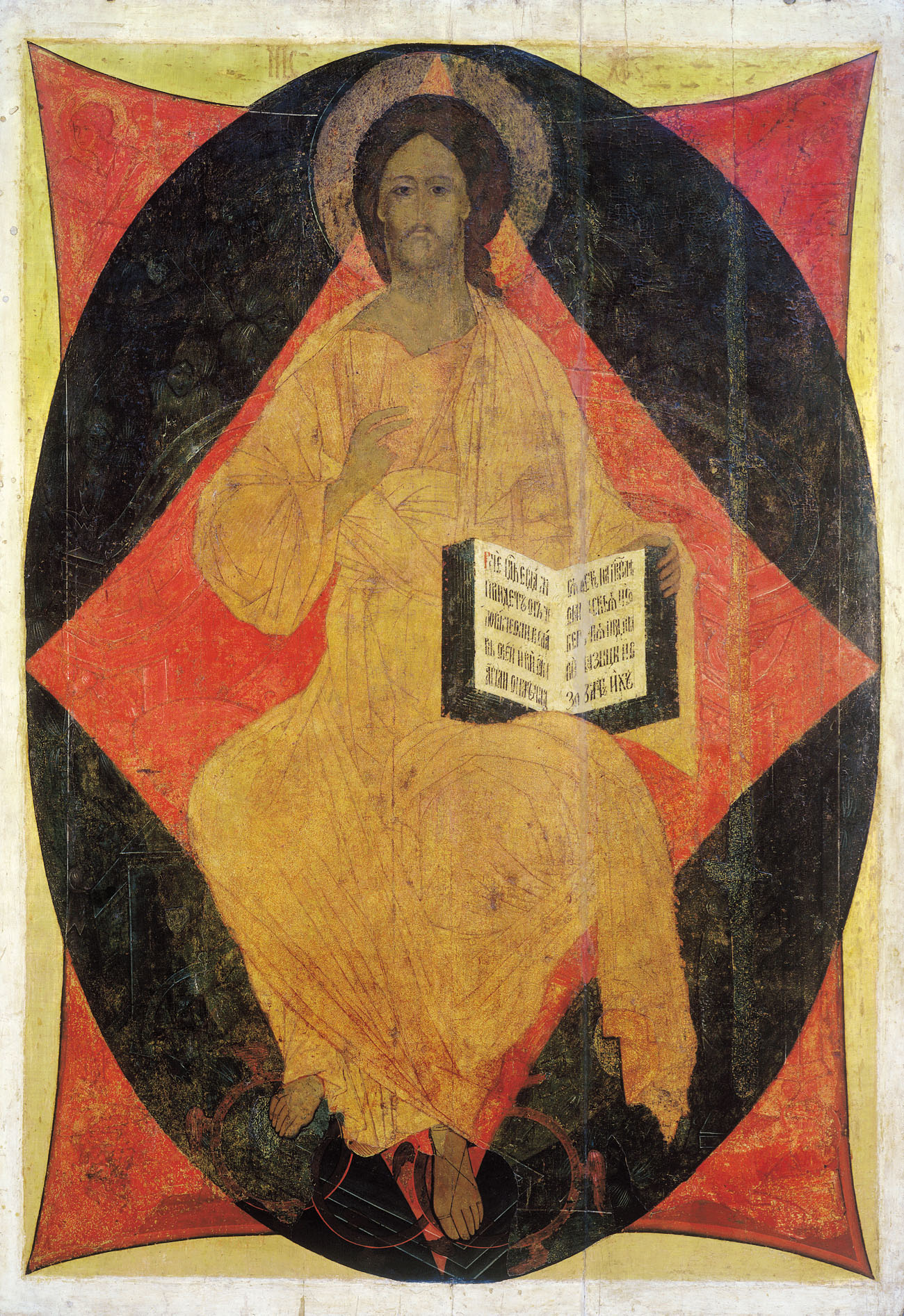
The Saviour Enthroned in Glory, Christ in Majesty, 1408 (Dormition Cathedral, Vladimir)

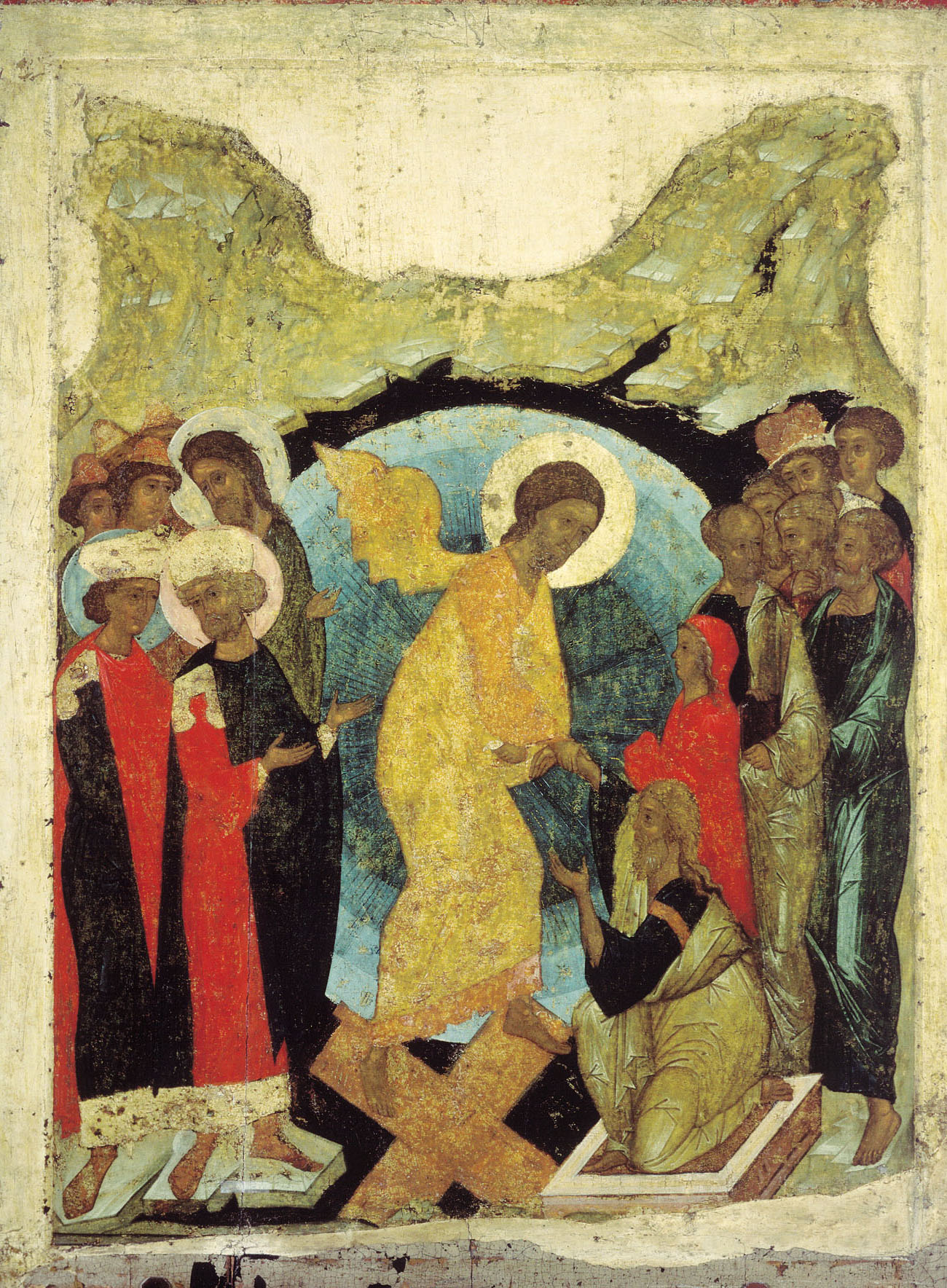
Harrowing of Hell, 1408–1410 (Vladimir)

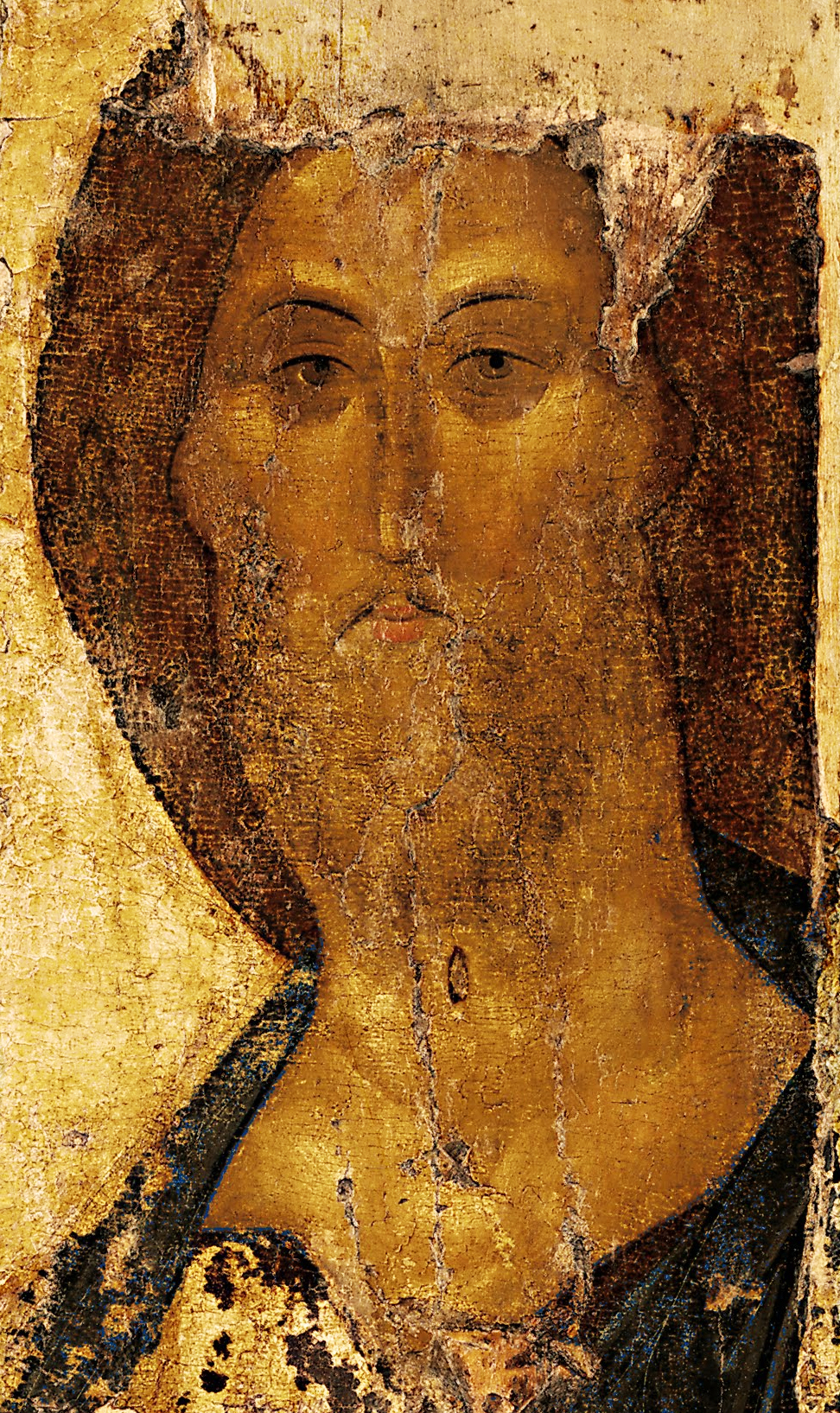
Christ the Redeemer, c. 1410 (Tretyakov Gallery, Moscow)

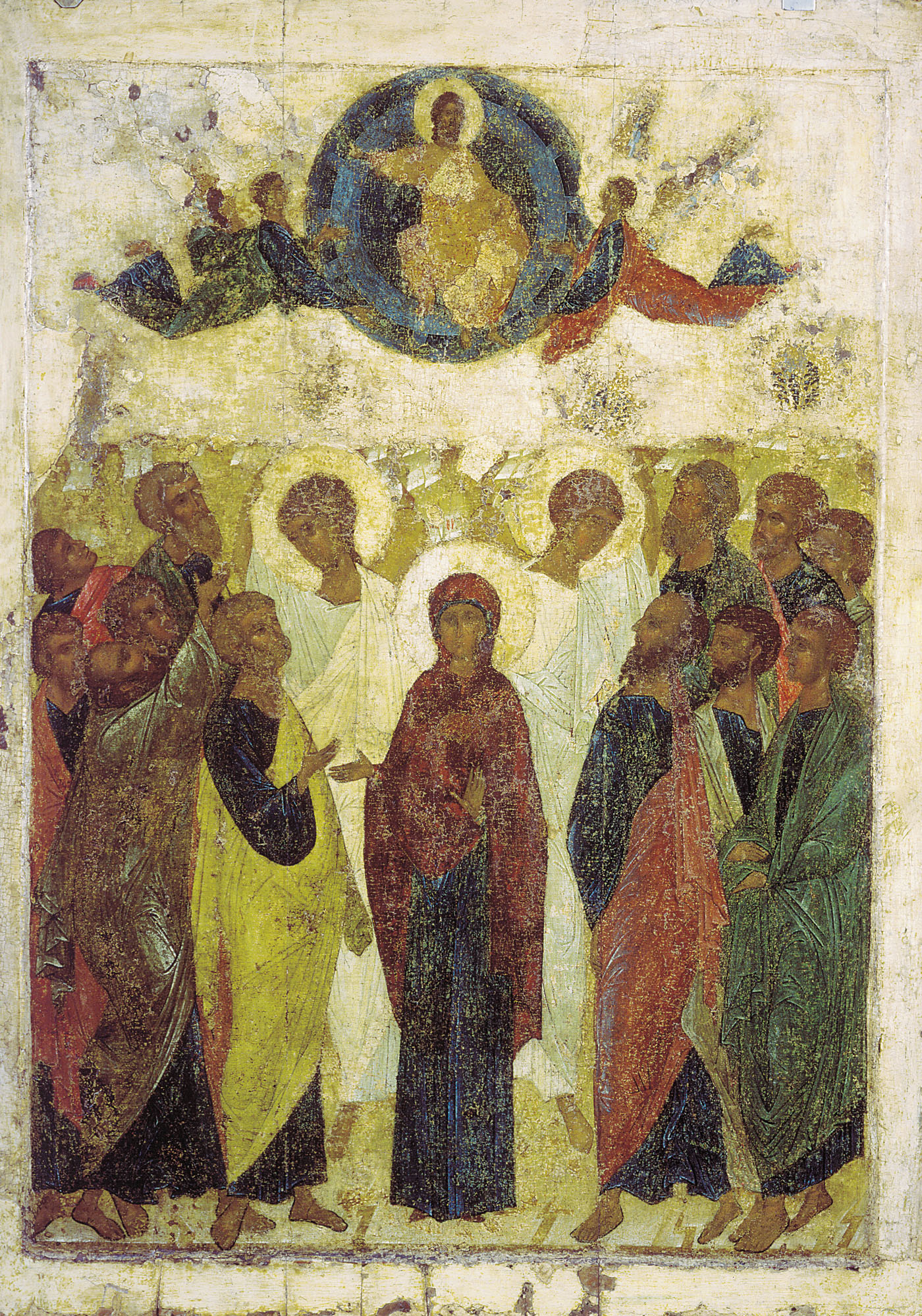
Ascension, 1408 (Tretyakov Gallery, Moscow)

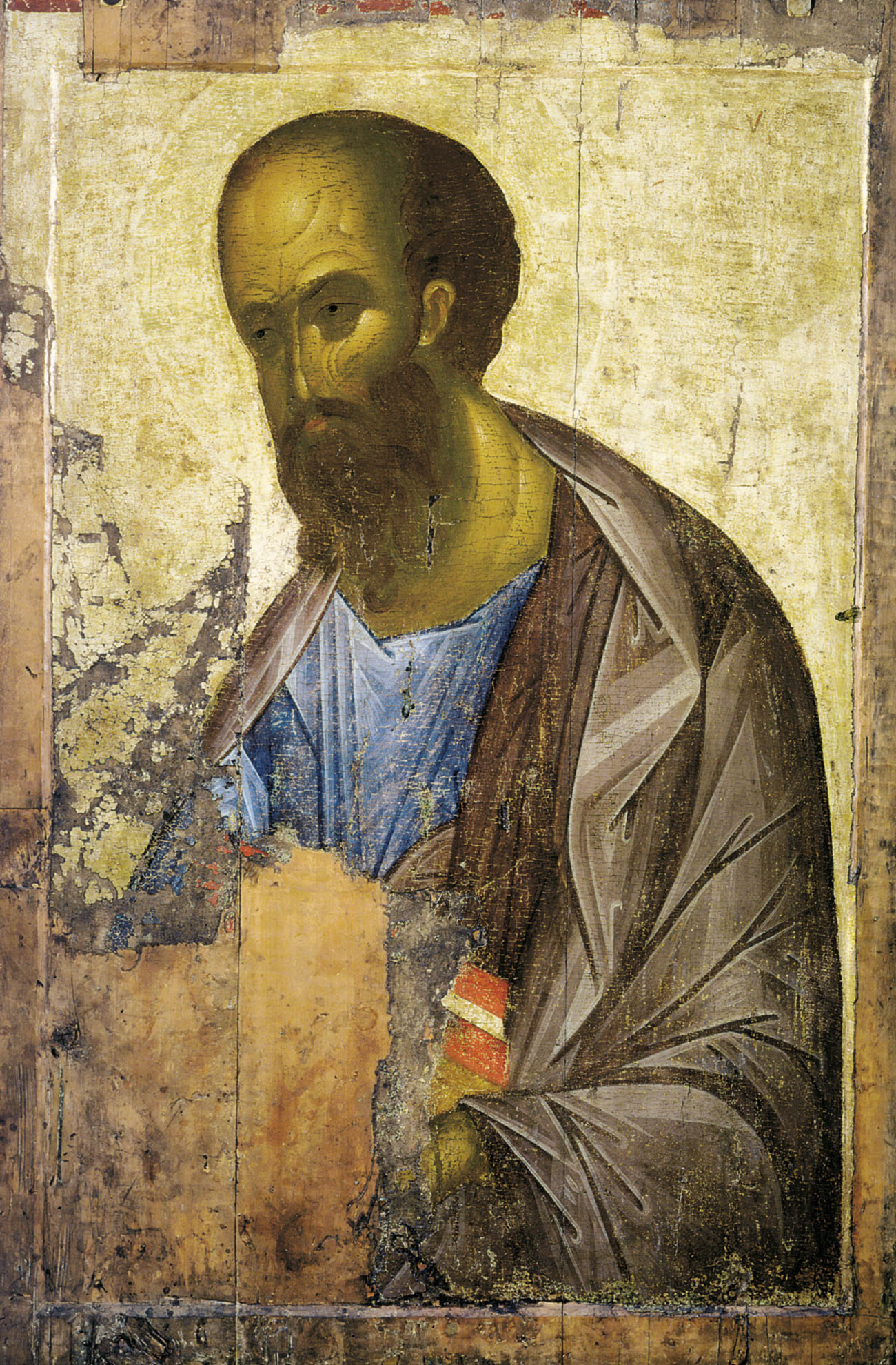
Apostle Paul, 1410s (Tretyakov Gallery, Moscow)

== Sources ==
- Andrei Rublev, a 1966 film by Andrei Tarkovsky loosely based on the painter's life.
- Mikhail V. Alpatov, Andrey Rublev, Moscow: Iskusstvo, 1972.
- Gabriel Bunge, The Rublev Trinity, transl. Andrew Louth, St. Vladimir's Seminary Press, Crestwood, New York, 2007.
- Sergius Golubtsov, Voplosh’enie bogoslovskih idey v tvorchestve prepodobnogo Andreya Rubleva [The realization of theological ideas in creative works of Andrey Rublev]. Bogoslovskie trudy 22, 20–40, 1981.
- Troitca Andreya Rubleva [The Trinity of Andrey Rublev], Gerold I. Vzdornov (ed.), Moscow: Iskusstvo 1989.
- Viktor N. Lazarev, The Russian Icon: From Its Origins to the Sixteenth Century, Gerold I. Vzdornov (ed.). Collegeville, MN: Liturgical Press, 1997.
- Priscilla Hunt, Andrei Rublev's Old Testament Trinity Icon in Cultural Context, The Trinity-Sergius Lavr in Russian History and Culture: Readings in Russian Religious Culture, vol. 3, ed. Deacon Vladimir Tsurikov, (Jordanville, NY: Holy Trinity Seminary Press, 2006), 99-122.(See on-line at phslavic.com)
- Priscilla Hunt, Andrei Rublev's Old Testament Trinity Icon: Problems of Meaning, Intertextuality, and Transmission, Symposion: A Journal of Russian (Religious) Thought, ed. Roy Robson, 7-12 (2002–2007), 15-46 (See on-line at www.phslavic.com)
- Konrad Onasch, Das Problem des Lichtes in der Ikonomalerei Andrej Rublevs. Zur 600–Jahrfeier des grossen russischen Malers, vol. 28. Berlin: Berliner byzantinische Arbeiten, 1962.
- Konrad Onasch, Das Gedankenmodell des byzantisch–slawischen Kirchenbaus. In Tausend Jahre Christentum in Russland, Karl Christian Felmy et al. (eds.), 539–543. Go¨ ttingen: Vandenhoeck und Ruprecht, 1988.
- Eugeny N. Trubetskoi, Russkaya ikonopis'. Umozrenie w kraskah. Wopros o smysle vizni w drewnerusskoj religioznoj viwopisi [Russian icon painting. Colourful contemplation. Question of the meaning of life in early Russian religious painting], Moscow: Beliy Gorod, 2003 [1916].
- Georgij Yu. Somov, Semiotic systemity of visual artworks: Case study of The Holy Trinity by Rublev, Semiotica 166 (1/4), 1-79, 2007.
