= Andronikos Palaiologos =

Andronikos Palaiologos or Andronicus Palaeologus (Greek: Ἀνδρόνικος Παλαιολόγος) may refer to:

- Andronikos Doukas Palaiologos (c. 1183/85 – c. 1115/18), governor of Thessalonica under Alexios I
- Andronikos Palaiologos (late 12th century) (fl. 1185–1191), general
- Andronikos Palaiologos (son-in-law of Theodore I) (fl. 1211), briefly heir-apparent of the Empire of Nicaea
- Andronikos Palaiologos (megas domestikos), father of Michael VIII Palaiologos
- Andronikos Palaiologos (died 1279/80), nephew or cousin of Michael VIII Palaiologos
- Andronikos II Palaiologos (1259–1332), Byzantine emperor from 1282 to 1328
- Andronikos Palaiologos (fl. 1320s), general during the civil war of 1321–28
- Andronikos Angelos Palaiologos (fl. 1326/8), Byzantine lord of Berat under Andronikos II
- Andronikos III Palaiologos (1297–1341), Byzantine emperor from 1321 to 1341, sole emperor from 1328
- Andronikos Palaiologos (died 1344), general during the civil war of 1341–47
- Andronikos IV Palaiologos (1348–1385), Byzantine emperor from 1376 to 1379
- Andronikos V Palaiologos (c. 1400–1407), son of John VII Palaiologos, co-emperor from c. 1403 to his death
- Andronikos Palaiologos (son of Manuel II) (1404–1428), son of Manuel II Palaiologos, governor of Thessalonica from 1408 to 1423
- Andronikos Palaiologos Kantakouzenos (died 1453), last Grand Domestic of the Byzantine Empire
