= Andronikos Palaiologos (late 12th century) =

12th-century Byzantine aristocrat and general

Andronikos Palaiologos (Greek: Ἀνδρόνικος Παλαιολόγος; fl. 1185–91) was a Byzantine aristocrat and general active in the late 12th century.

Very little is known about him. He is first mentioned in 1185, as one of the generals sent under the overall command of Alexios Gidos to aid the city of Thessalonica, which was being besieged by the Normans. He is then recorded for the last time in the acts of a synod held in 1191, where he is mentioned as holding the rank of protosebastohypertatos and as a relative by marriage of the reigning emperor, Isaac II Angelos. The scholar Michael Glykas addressed a short homily to him.

== Sources ==
- Cheynet, Jean-Claude; Vannier, Jean-François (1986). Études Prosopographiques (in French). Paris: Publications de la Sorbonne. ISBN 978-2-85944-110-4.
