= Andronikos Komnenos (disambiguation) =

Andronikos Komnenos or Andronicus Comnenus (Greek: Ἀνδρόνικος Κομνηνός) may refer to:

- Andronikos Komnenos (son of Alexios I) (1091–1130/31), Byzantine prince
- Andronikos Komnenos (son of John II) (c. 1108-1142), Byzantine prince
- Andronikos I Komnenos (c. 1118-1185), Byzantine emperor
- Andronikos II Megas Komnenos (d. 1266), ruler of Trebizond
- Andronikos III Megas Komnenos (d. 8 January 1332), ruler of Trebizond
