= Andronikov Monastery =

Former monastery in Moscow, Russia

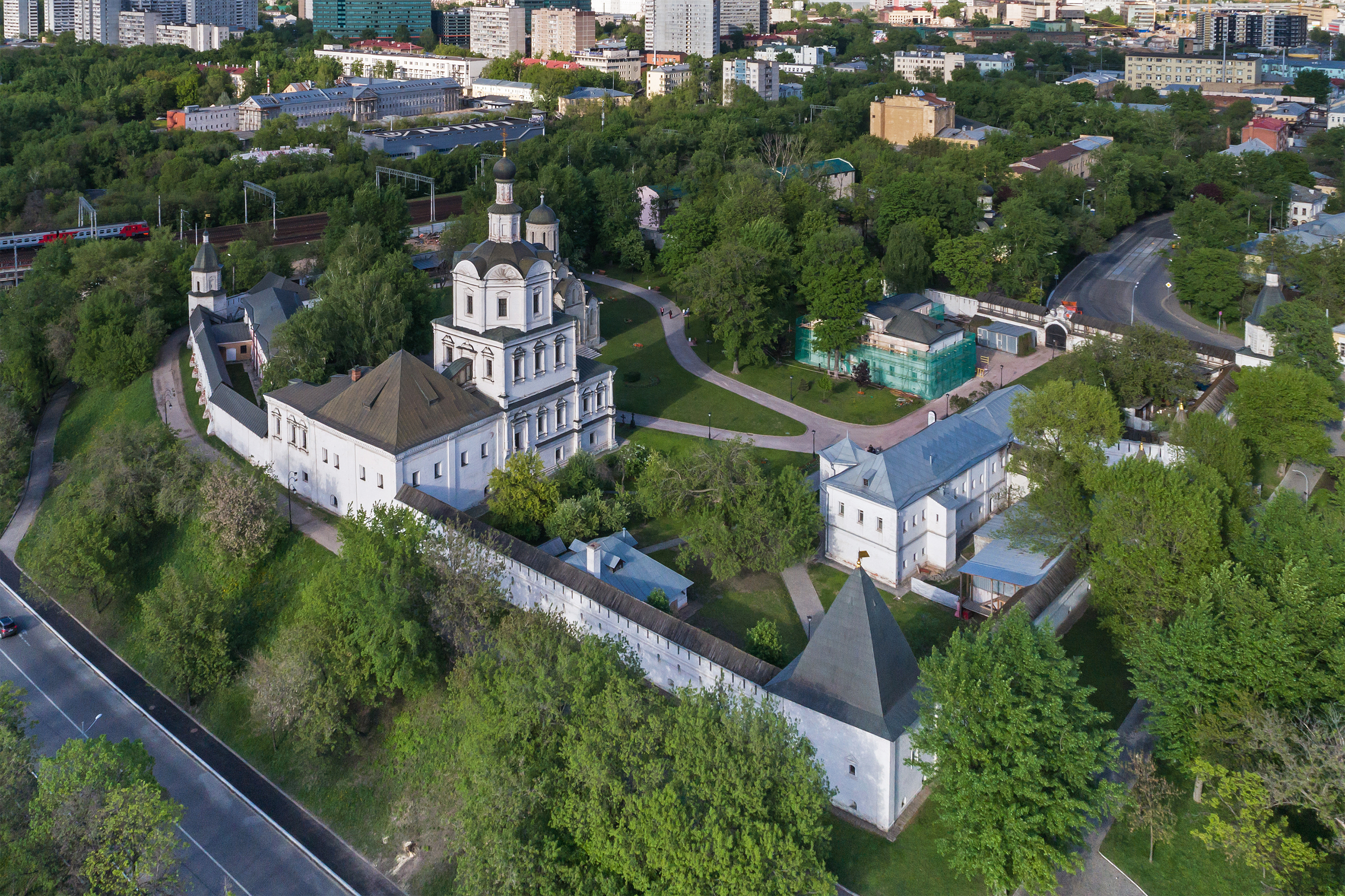
- Andronikov Monastery in 2017
- Interactive map of Andronikov Monastery

Monastery information
- Full name: Andronikov Monastery of the Saviour
- Order: Orthodox
- Established: 1357
- Disestablished: 1918
- Diocese: Moscow

People
- Founder: Metropolitan Alexis
- Important associated figures: Andrei Rublev, Avvakum

Site
- Location: Moscow, Russia
- Coordinates: 55°44′56″N 37°40′14″E

Andronikov Monastery of the Saviour (Russian: Андро́ников монасты́рь, romanized: Andrónikov monastýr', Russian: Спа́со-Андро́ников монасты́рь, romanized: Spáso-Andrónikov monastýr', or Russian: Андро́ников Нерукотво́рного Спа́са монасты́рь, romanized: Andrónikov Nyerukotvórnogo Spása monastýr') is a former monastery on the left bank of the Yauza River in Moscow, consecrated to the Holy Image of Saviour Not Made by Hands and containing the oldest extant (i.e. outside the Kremlin) building in Moscow. It is home to Andrei Rublev Museum of Old Russian Art, named after the most famous monk of this abbey.

== Muscovite and Imperial period ==
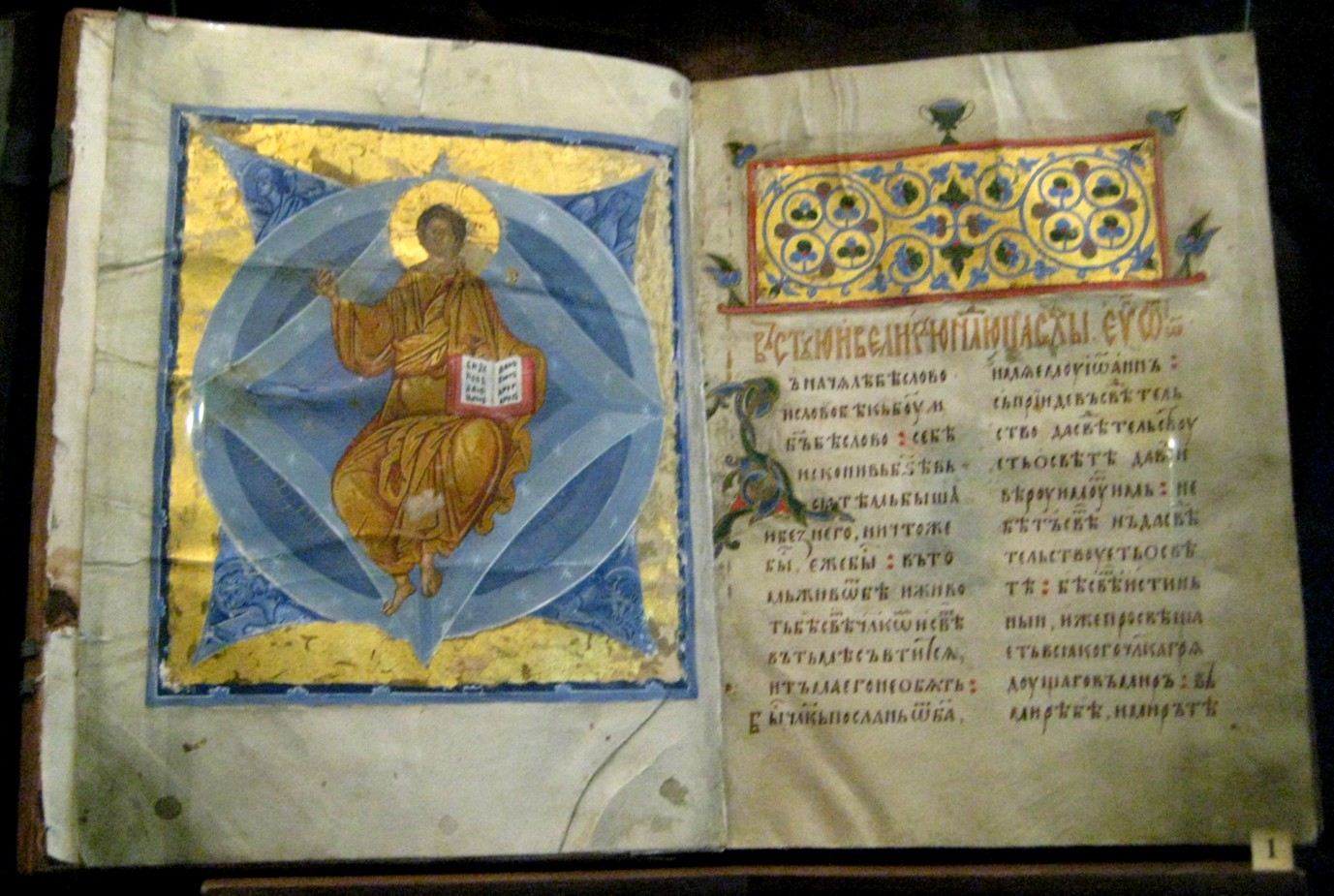
The Andronikov Gospels was made in the monastery in the early 15th century

The monastery was established in 1357 by Metropolitan Alexis as a way of giving thanks for his survival in a storm. Its first hegumen was Saint Andronik of Moscow, one of Sergii Radonezhsky's disciples. The extant four-pillared Saviour Cathedral was constructed from 1420–1427. The great medieval painter Andrei Rublev spent the last years of his life at the monastery and was buried there. In addition, one of the largest mass graves for lay brothers (called скудельница, skudelnitsa) was located on the cloister's premises.

In the second half of the 14th century, a monastic quarter formed outside the walls of the Andronikov Monastery, which started producing bricks for the ongoing construction of the Moscow Kremlin (1475). From its beginning, Andronikov Monastery was one of the centres of book copying in Muscovy. Manuscript collection of the cloister included most of the works by Maximus the Greek. In August 1653, archpriest Avvakum was held under arrest at this monastery.

Andronikov Monastery has been ransacked on numerous occasions (1571, 1611, 1812). In 1748 and 1812, its archives were lost in fires. In the 19th century, there were a theological seminary and a library on the cloister's premises. In 1917, there were seventeen monks and one novice in the monastery.

== Soviet period and beyond ==
After the Russian Revolution of 1917, the Andronikov Monastery was closed. One of the first Cheka's penal colonies (mostly, for foreign nationals) was located within the walls of the monastery.

In 1928, the Soviets destroyed the necropolis of the Andronikov Monastery, where Andrei Rublev and soldiers of the Great Northern War and the Patriotic War had been interred. In 1947, however, Andronikov Monastery was declared a national monument.

In 1985, the Andrei Rublev Central Museum of Ancient Russian Culture and Art was opened on the cloister's premises. In 1991, the Saviour cathedral was returned to the Russian Orthodox Church. Archaeological excavations on the cloister's territory in 1993 uncovered an ancient altar and other relics.

== Monuments ==
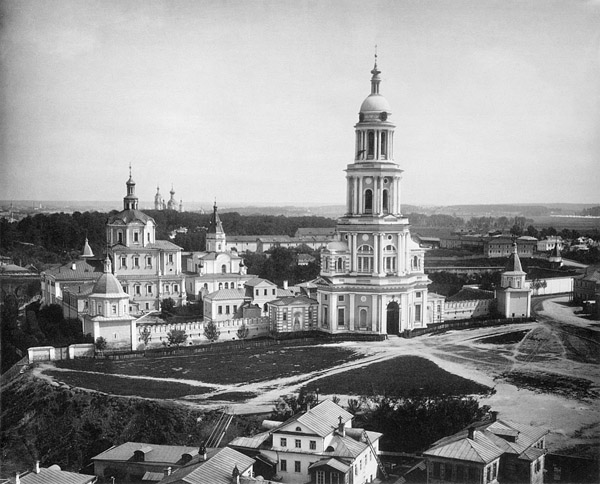
Andronikov Belfry used to be 72.5 metres high; only 8.5 metres lower than the tallest structure in Moscow of that time, Ivan the Great Belltower.

Since the 1930s, when the Communists destroyed the 14th-century Saviour Cathedral in the Wood, the monastery's cathedral has attracted a renewed interest as the oldest preserved in Moscow. Consequently, its present outlook is the result of a controversial Soviet restoration (1959–1960), which sought to remove all additions from later periods. Nothing but traces of the frescoes by Andrei Rublev and Daniil Chyorny remain visible on its walls.

The second oldest monument (1504–1506) in the abbey is a spacious refectory, the third largest such structure after those in the Palace of Facets and Joseph-Volotsky Monastery. The adjacent baroque church was commissioned by Eudoxia Lopukhina in 1694 to commemorate the birth of her son, Tsarevich Alexis, and contains a burial vault of the Lopukhin family.

Massive 17th-century walls and towers are reminiscent of the period when the monastery defended the eastern approaches against the Moscow Kremlin. In 1795, they started a Neoclassical belltower, one of the tallest in Moscow of that time. The belfry was destroyed in 1929–1932, and its bricks were subsequently reused in construction of nearby buildings.

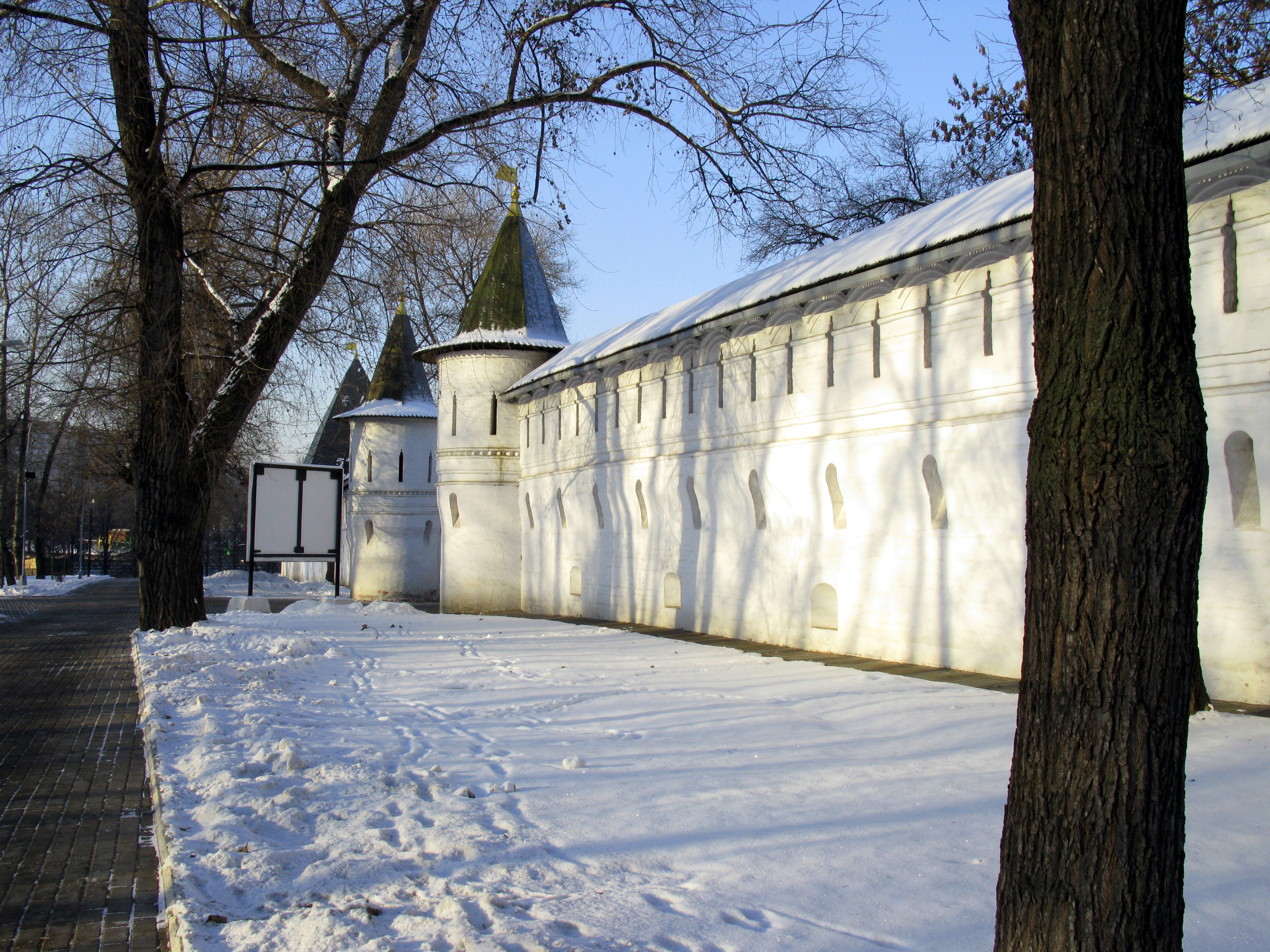
The fortified monastery used to protect approaches to Moscow from the south.

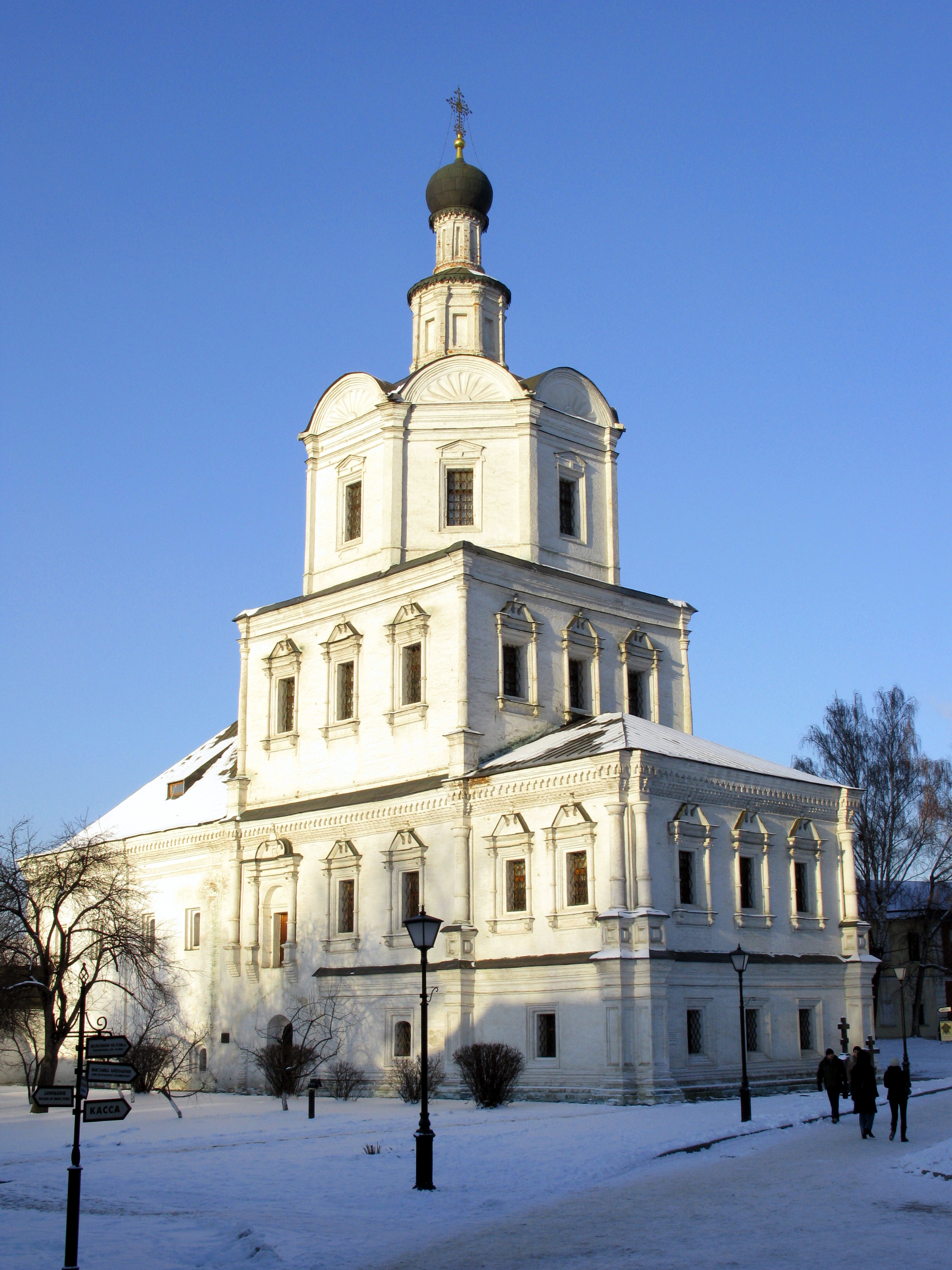
Church of Michael the Archangel (1690s, restored 1960)

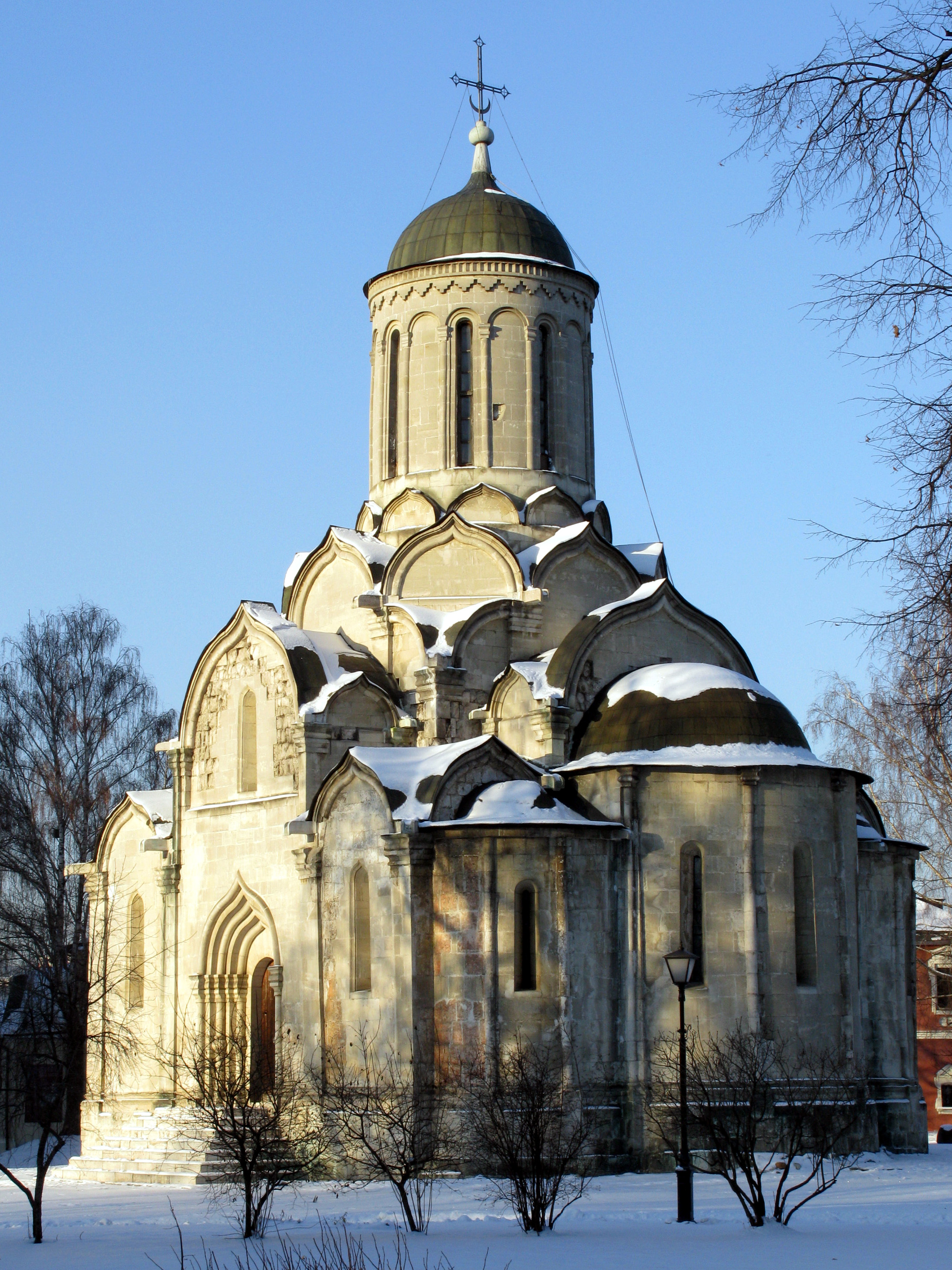
The katholikon (1420s, restored 1959)

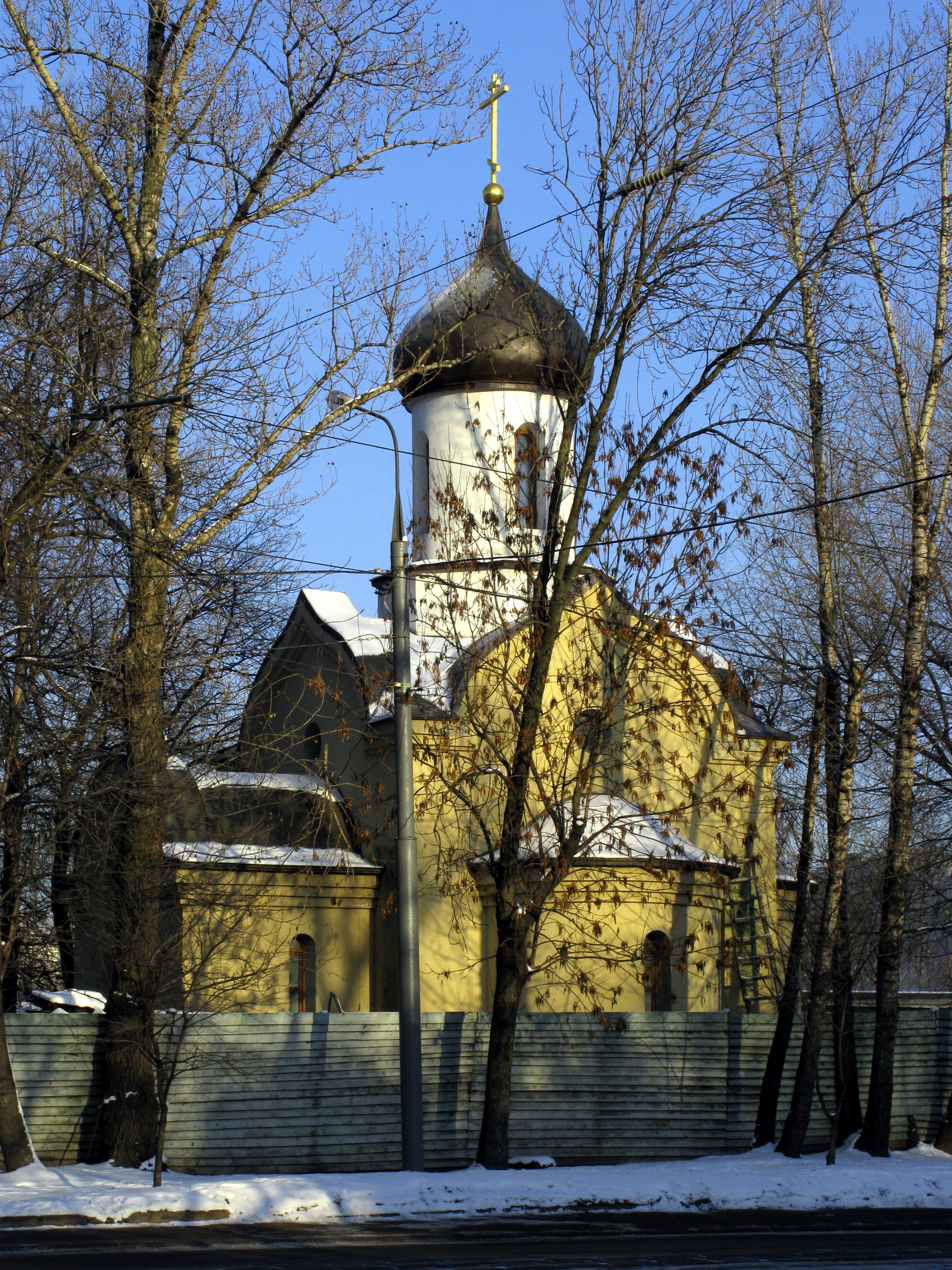
Chapel of Dmitry Donskoy (2000–2001)
