= Andronicus of Macedonia =

Andronicus (Greek: Ἀνδρόνικος) was an Ancient Macedonian who is first mentioned in the war against Antiochus III the Great in 190 BCE, as the governor of Ephesus. He is spoken of in 169 as one of the generals of Perseus of Macedon, and was sent by him to burn the dock-yards at Thessalonica, which he delayed doing, wishing to gratify the Romans, according to Diodorus Siculus, or thinking that the king would relent of his purpose, as Livy conjectures.

Andronicus was shortly afterwards put to death by Perseus.
