= Andronicus (physician) =

Andronicus (Ancient Greek: Ἀνδρόνικος) was an ancient Greek physician.

Andronicus was mentioned by Theodorus Priscianus, and also by Galen, and can thus be dated in or before the second century. No other particulars are known respecting him; but it may be remarked, that the Andronicus quoted several times by Galen with the epithet Peripateticus or Rhodius, is probably another person. Both André Tiraqueau and Johann Albert Fabricius referred to him as "Andronicus Ticianus," but this is considered a mistake by later scholars, as Andronicus and Titianus appear to have been two different persons.
