= Andronicus ben Meshullam =

Jewish scholar of the 2nd century BC

Andronicus ben Meshullam, a Jewish scholar of the 2nd century BCE. According to Josephus (Ant. xiii. 3, § 4), he was the representative of the Jews in their religious dispute with the Samaritans, which was held before King Ptolemy VI Philometor, about the year 150 BCE. Andronicus was said to have proved from the Scriptures the historic continuity of the Jewish high priests; and from the great respect which was accorded the Temple of Jerusalem even by the non-Jewish kings of Asia, he argued that the claim of the Samaritans that Mount Gerizim was the sacred place of worship for the Israelites was unjustified.

Andronicus is said to have argued his case so successfully that the king ordered the execution of Sabbeus and Theodosius, the two champions of the Samaritans, this being the penalty agreed upon beforehand for the losing party.
