= Andronicus, Probus, and Tarachus =

Fourth-century Christian martyrs

Saints Andronicus, Probus, and Tarachus
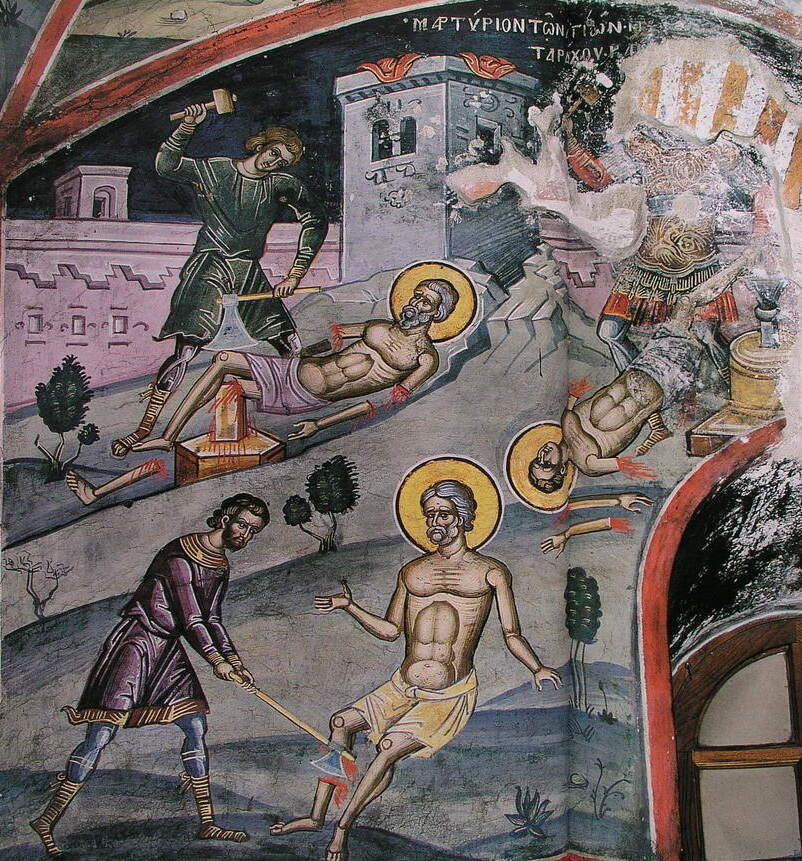
- Fresco from Dionysiou Monastery

Martyrs
- Born: c. 239 (Tarachus)
- Died: 304; Tarsus, Asia Minor (modern-day Tarsus, Mersin, Turkey)
- Venerated in: Roman Catholic Church, Greek Orthodox Church; Romanian Orthodox Church
- Canonized: Pre-congregation
- Feast: October 11 (Roman Catholic Church), October 12 (Greek Orthodox Church)
- Attributes: Tarachus is depicted as an elderly man, in the robes of a Roman citizen, with a spear. The others are depicted with crosses or spears.

Andronicus, Probus and Tarachus (Greek: Άνδρόνικος, Πρόβος καί Ταράχος) were martyrs of the Diocletian persecution (about 304), executed in Cilicia. Their feast day is 11 October. According to tradition, Tarachus was beaten with stones. Probus was thrashed with whips, his back and sides were pierced with heated spits; finally he also was cut up with knives. Andronicus was also cut to pieces with knives.

== Legend ==
Two versions of their Acts exist, both medieval fictions. The text of the first version (BHG 1574) is in the Acta Sanctorum, October volume 5, 566-584. The second version, revised by Simeon Metaphrastes (BHG 1575) is in the Patrologia Graeca volume 115, 1068-1080. The first account is held by Thierry Ruinart to be entirely authentic. Harnack, however, expressed doubts as to the genuineness of the account, and Hippolyte Delehaye puts the martyrdom in the class of legends of martyrs that he calls "historical romances".

According to the first version of the Acts, Tarachus (c. 239–304), a Roman who was a native of Claudiopolis in Isauria and a former soldier, the plebeian Probus of Side in Pamphylia, and the patrician Andronicus, who belonged to a prominent family of Ephesus, were tried by the governor Numerian Maximus and horribly tortured three times in various cities, including Tarsus, Mopsuestia, and Anazarbus of Cilicia.

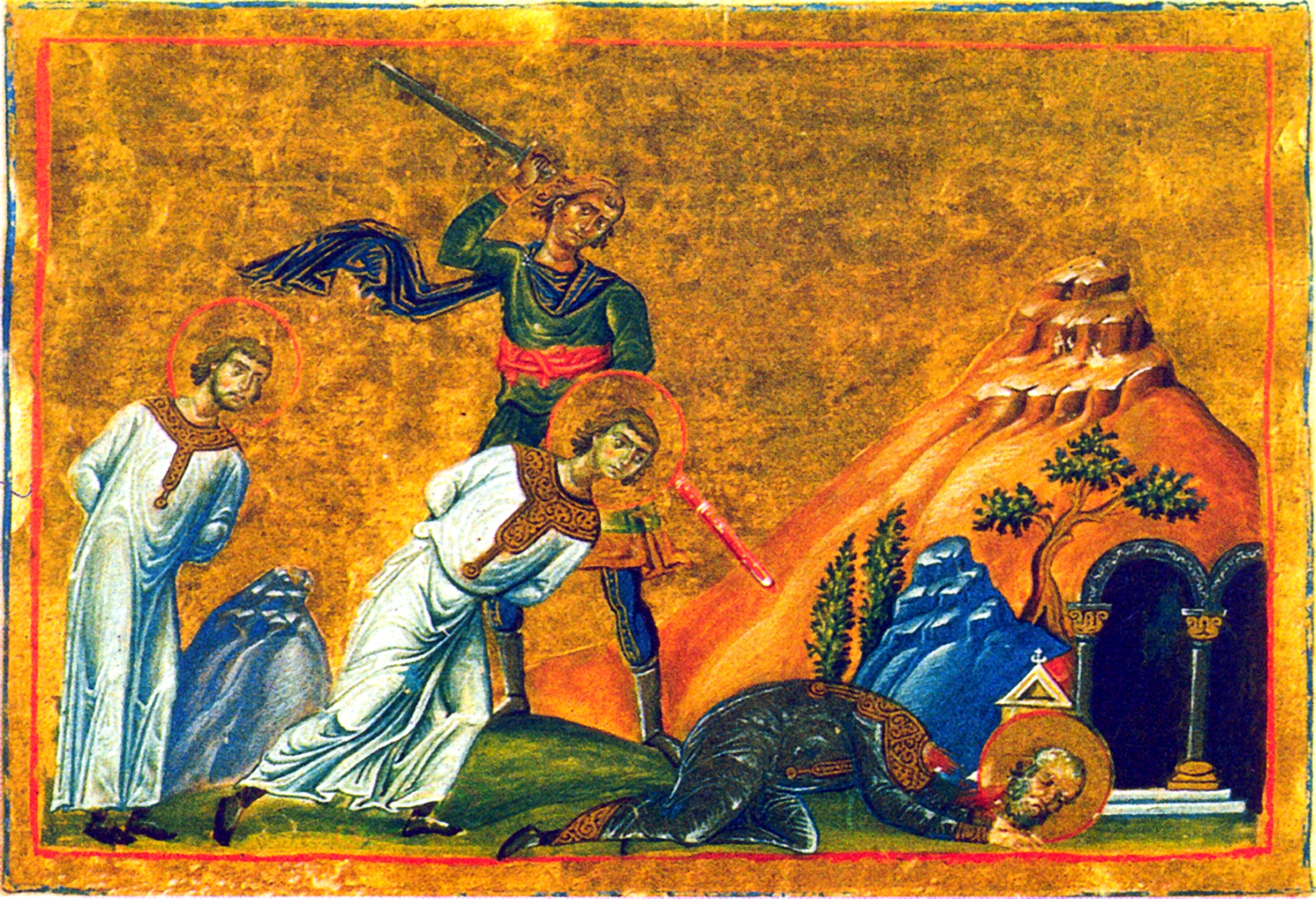
Martyrdom of Andronicus, Probus, and Tarachus

According to tradition, Tarachus was beaten with stones. Probus was thrashed with whips, his feet were burned with red hot irons, his back and sides were pierced with heated spits; finally he also was cut up with knives. Andronicus was also cut to pieces with knives.

They were then condemned to death by wild beasts, and when the animals would not touch them in the amphitheatre they were put to death with the sword. Three men, named Marcian, Felix, and Verus, witnessed their martyrdom and added an epilogue to the saints' Acts. They retrieved the bodies of the three saints, buried them, and watched over them the rest of their lives, requesting that they be buried in the same vault as the martyrs at the end of theirs.

Their feast is celebrated in the Roman Catholic Church on October 11, and in the Greek Orthodox Church on October 12.

== Tarachus in the Maronite Church ==
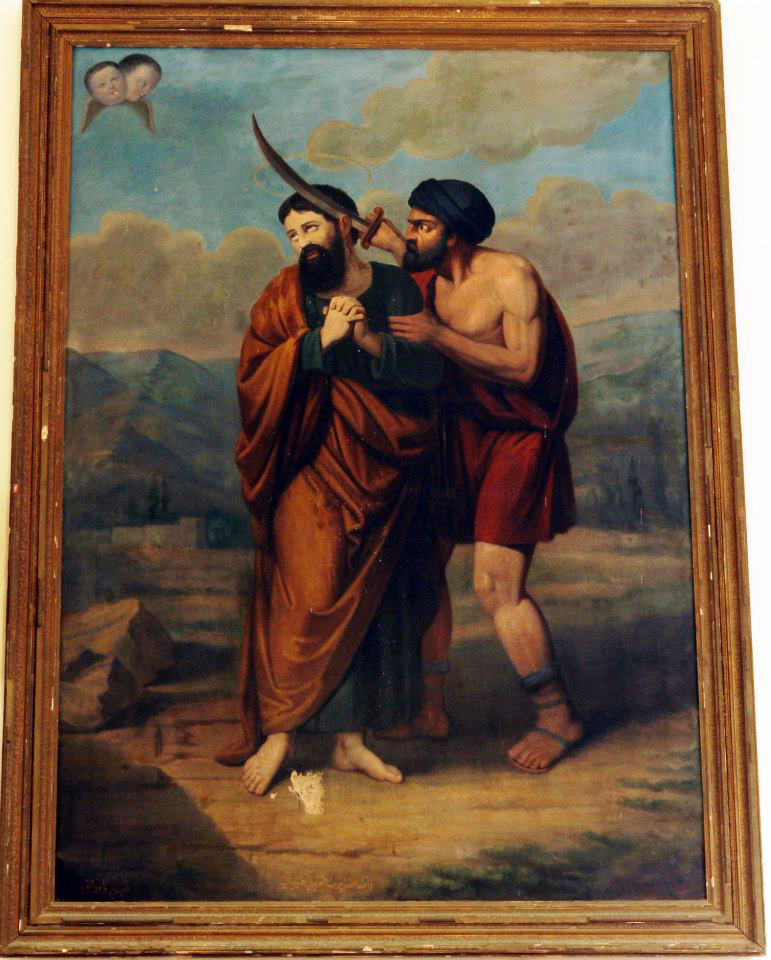
Mar Edna by Daoud Corm (1884)

Tarachus is venerated in the Maronite Church, where he is referred to as Mar Edna (Syriac: ܡܪܝ ܐܕܢܐ, Arabic: مار إدنا). The word edna (ܐܕܢܐ) means ear in Syriac, in relation to Tarachus' ears being cut off during his torture by the Romans. He is the patron saint of those suffering from ear ailments.

The Mar Edna monastery exists in Aqoura, Lebanon. There is also Mar Edna church in Chabtine, which he is the patron saint of. There is also another Mar Edna church in Ain Akrine, Lebanon.

== See also ==
- Andronicus, Probus, and Tarachus, patron saint archive
