= Battle of the Novgorodians with the Suzdalians =

15th-century Russian icon

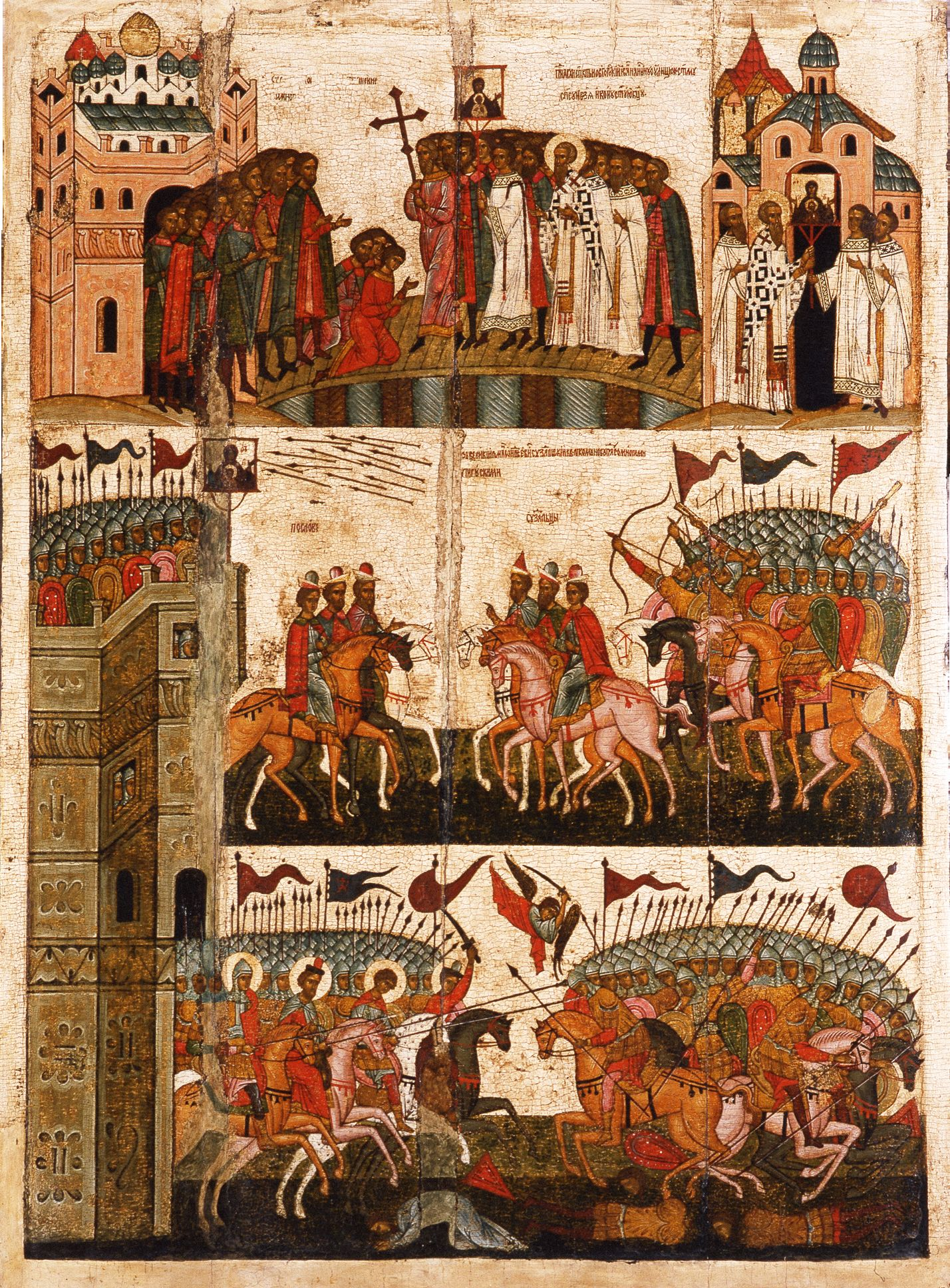
Battle of the Novgorodians with the Suzdalians

Battle of the Novgorodians with the Suzdalians (Russian: битва новгородцев с суздальцами, romanized: bitva Novgorodtsev s Suzdal'tsami) is a Russian icon of the Novgorod school dated to the mid-15th century, depicting the siege of Novgorod in 1170.

== Legend of the icon ==
According to a later legend (first written down almost three centuries after the battle), during the siege, Archbishop Ilya of Novgorod, ordered that the Icon of the Mother of God of the Sign (Russian: Богоматер Знамение, romanized: Bogomater Znameniye) be brought from the Church of the Transfiguration on Ilin Street on the eastern edge of the city, across the great bridge spanning the Volkhov River, and into the Detinets to be venerated in the Cathedral of Holy Wisdom and displayed from the Detinets walls give the Novgorodians courage. According to the legend, when the deacon went to the church, he (miraculously) could not lift the icon and went back to report this to the archbishop, who went himself over the bridge to the church and processed with the icon back to the Detinets. the icon was then displayed on the walls and, according to the tale, struck by a Suzdalian arrow, at which time, according to the legend, it wept. The legend went on to say that through the intercessions of the Mother of God and of Archbishop Ilya, and several other saints (most notably Boris and Gleb and St. George, all depicted in the icons of the battle leading the Novgorodian army out against the Suzdalians), the Novgorodians were able to defeat the Suzdalians, after which Prince Andrei withdrew back to Suzdalia.

The legend surrounding Ilya and the Icon of the Mother of God of the Sign probably survived in oral form for some time. It appears to have been first committed to writing during the archiepiscopate of Evfimy II (1429–1458), when he patronized the composition of the tale by Pachomius the Serb, a famous hagiographer of the period in the employ both of the Novgoodian archbishops but also of the grand princes and metropolitans in Moscow. After writing up several of the legends surrounding Ilya under Evfimii, Pachomius went off and worked at the Trinity Monastery of St. Sergius near Moscow; he returned to Novgorod during the archiepiscopate of Iona (1458–1470) and composed a life of Ilya in which the episode figured prominently. The tale was later included in the Books of Degrees compiled under Metropolitan Macarius of Moscow, who had been the archbishop of Novgorod prior to his metropolitanate.

== See also ==
- Blessed Be the Host of the Heavenly Tsar
- Our Lady of the Sign (Novgorod)

== Sources ==
- Alpatov, Mikhail Vladimirovich (1978). Древнерусская иконопись. Moscow: Iskusstvo. p. 114.
- Hughes, Lindsey (2006). "Art and liturgy in Russia: Rublev and his successors". The Cambridge History of Christianity: Volume 5: Eastern Christianity. Cambridge University Press. pp. 276–301. ISBN 978-0-521-81113-2.
