= Our Lady of the Sign (Novgorod) =

Icon in Novgorod

Znamenie
- Знамение (Znameniye) (Russian), Our Lady of the Sign (English)
- Year: First half of 12th century
- Type: Orans
- Dimensions: 59 cm × 57.2 cm (23 in × 22.5 in)
- Location: Cathedral of St. Sophia; Veliky Novgorod

Znа́meniye (Russian: Зна́мение) or Our Lady of the Sign is an icon in the orans style, dated at the first half of the 12th century. The icon was painted in medieval Novgorod. It is one of the most revered icons of the Russian Orthodox Church and the main holy of Russian North-West. In past the icon was the main icon of the Novgorod Republic and the symbol of Novgorod sovereignty and republicanism due to the event that has glorified the icon.

== Description ==
The icon symbolizes the pregnancy of the Virgin: it shows Our Lady with hands raised for praying and the figure of the holy infant in her chest in the circle (orans type of icons). The icon is 2-sided: saint Joachim and saint Anne in praying are pictured on the back side. It has a shaft which for an icon indicates the ability to be carried outside.

In the 17th century the paint was refreshed: Macarius, the metropolitan of Moscow, is believed to be the possible executor). The initial ancient paint is retained only in fragments (some of the Virgin’s dress, and the circle around the Jesus). The back side image is absolutely original, in the ancient paint.

== History ==
The origins of the icon are unknown. The icon is ascribed to be miraculous. The miracle reportedly occurred during the Siege of Novgorod (1170), when Novgorod was besieged by the army of Andrei Bogolubsky, the prince of Suzdal. The struggle has become a seminal iconographic theme since.

In 1170 the united army of four Rus' principalities (duchy of Vladimir, duchy of Smolensk, duchy of Murom and duchy of Polotsk) laid siege to the city. Subsequent events are described in the Novgorodian saga, The Tale of the Battle of the Novgorodians with the Suzdalians (written in the 1440s or 1450s, three centuries after the events), cited below.

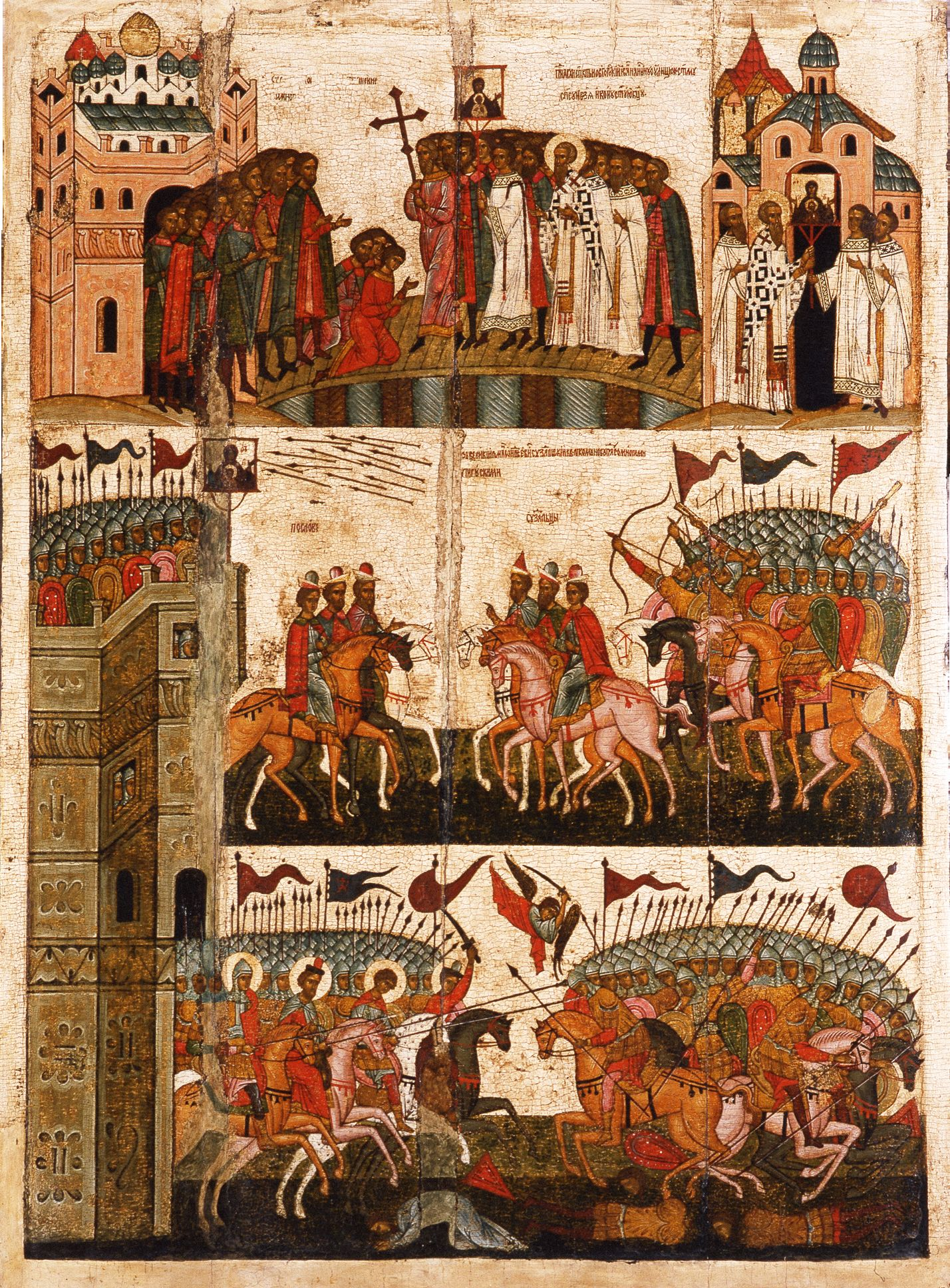
The battle as shown by Novgorodian icon

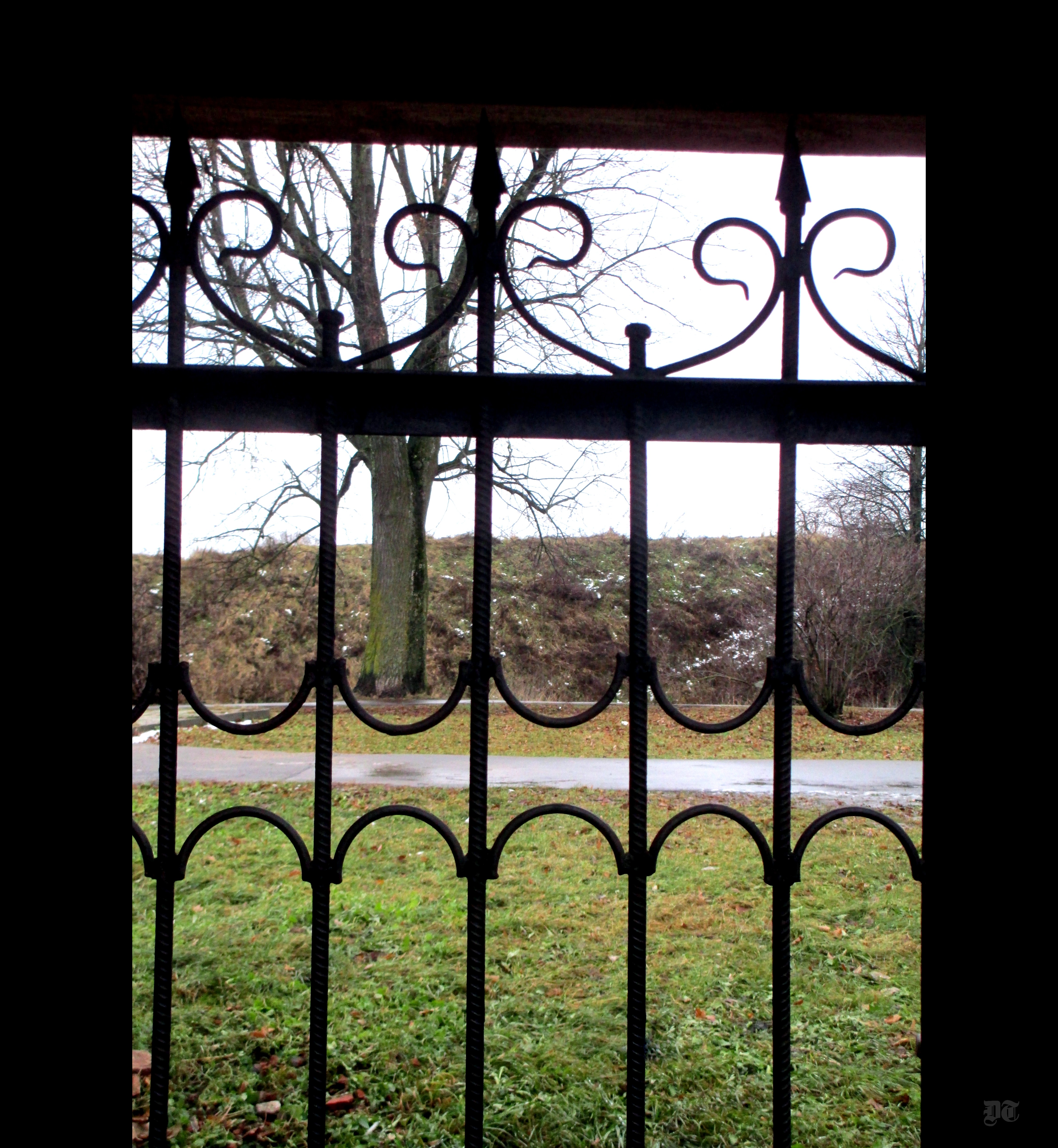
The place where the icon Znamenie was reportedly shown to the adversaries (the part of the rampart remains in Novgorod through the grid of the monastery's portal), December 2014

... Novgorodians had heard about the great forces stepping against them, and were sad being in great sorrow and mourning, and, complained bitterly, were praying to the merciful Father, and the holy Virgin, Our Lady. And they made up a burg around the whole of Novgorod, and hid themselves behind the walls. And Suzdalians had come with the princes of all Russia toward Novgorod, and had been staying near the city for 3 days.

At the second night of the siege, when saint Ivan the archbishop was standing against the holy image of Jesus and praying for the city to be saved, and was terrified, and heard a voice which called unto him: "Go ye to the Church of the Transfiguration on Ilyina Street, and take the icon of Our Lady, and bring it forth onto the wall of burg, and shew it to the adversaries". And saint Ivan the archbishop had hearkened that, and was sleepless all the night long, praying to Our Lady, the Mother of God.

<...>

And they brought the icon onto the walls of the burg, where the monastery in honour of Our Lady on the Tithe arises nowadays. And all the Novgorodians were hiding themselves behind the walls meekly, fearing to make a stand against the enemies; everyone was just mourning about their fate, anticipating the doom, as the Suzdalians had already divided the streets of Novgorod between themselves [which one belongs to what duchy].

Behold, when it was the sixth hour of the struggle, all the Russian regiments started the attack. And arrows fell down on the city like a shower. Then the icon by the providence of God had turned itself toward the city, and the archbishop saw the tears on the icon, and he put the icon under his phelonion. O, great awe-inspiring miracle! How may it be from a dry wood? These are not tears, but She showed a token of Her grace: that's the way how Our Lady was praying to Her Son and our God for our city not to be forsaken for the adversaries to outrage it.

Then the Lord became gracious toward the city due to the praying of Our Lady. And his anger was kindled against all the Russian regiments, and the night came down as it was when Moses had been leading the Israelis through the Red Sea, and drowned the pharaoh. So, the fear and trembling had captured them, and they all were blind, and fought amongst themselves. Seeing it, Novgorodians went to the battlefield, and killed many, and turned others into prisoners of war.

That's how honour and glory of Suzdal gone, and Novgorod was delivered out from the evil case by praying of Our Lady. And Ivan the archbishop had established a merry holiday, and all the Novgorod started to celebrate it - all the Novgorodians: men, women, children, - the holiday of Honourable Sign of Our Lady.

Hail, Our Lord.

[ The original text is cited below (Old East Slavic language, Old Novgorod dialect, adopted writing) ]

Новгородци же слышаху ту силу великую грядущюю на ся, и печалны быша въ скорбѣ велици и сѣтовании мнозѣ; моляшеся милостивому Богу и пречистѣй его матери, святѣй госпожѣ Богородици. И поставиша острогъ около всего Новагорода, а самѣ сташа за острогомъ. И придоша к Новугороду сусьдальци съ всими князьми земля Руския, стояху же подъ городомъ три дни.

Въ вторую же нощь святому архиепископу Ивану стоящю и молящюся святому образу Господа нашего Исуса Христа о спасении града сего, и бысть въ ужасѣ и слыша глас, глаголющь сице: «Иди в церковь святаго Спаса на Ильину улицю и возми икону святую Богородицю и вынеси на острогъ противу супостатъ». И святейший архиепископъ Иоан, то слышавъ, пребы безъ сна всю нощь, моляся святѣй Богородици, матери Божии.

<...>

И несоша икону на острогъ, идѣже нынѣ манастырь святыя Богородица на Десатинѣ. А новгородци вси бяху за острогомъ, не можаху противу стати, но токмо плакахуся кождо себе свою погыбель видяще, понеже бо суздалци и улици раздѣлиша на свои городы.

Бывшю же часу 6-му, начаша приступати ко городу вси полци рускыя. И спустиша стрѣлы, яко дождь умноженъ. Тогда же икона Божиимъ промысломъ обратися лицемъ на град и видѣ архиепископъ слезы, текуща от иконы, и приять въ фелонъ свой. И великое, страшное чюдо! Како се можеше быти от суха древа? Не суть бо слезы, но являеть знамение своея милости: симъ бо образомъ молится святая Богородица сыну своему и Богу нашему за град нашь — не дати в поругание супротивнымь.

Тогда Господь Богъ нашь умилосердися на град нашь молитвами святыя Богородица: пусти гнѣвъ свой на вся полкы рускыя, и покры ихъ тма, яко же бысть при Моисѣи, егда бо проведе Богъ сквозѣ Чермьное море жиды, а фараона погрузи. Тако и на сихъ нападе трепетъ и ужасть, и ослѣпоша вси, и начаша ся бити межи собою. Се же новгородци видѣвше, изыдоша на поле, ови избѣша, а прочихъ живы изымаша.

Оттолѣ отъятся слава суздальская и честь, Новгородъ же избавленъ бысть молитвами святыя Богородица. Святый же архиепископъ Иванъ створи празникъ светелъ, начаша праздновати всимь Новымьгородомъ вси мужи новгородци, жены и дѣти Честному Знамению святыи Богородица.

Богу же нашему.

—The Saga about the sign of the Holy Virgin in the year 6677th ("Слово о знамении святой Богородицы в лѢто 6677-е"), the middle of 14th century, the translation close to literal

The importance of that victory was hard to overestimate, taking into consideration the fact that a year before the same army of Andrei Bogolubsky and his allies had captured Kiev for the first time in history, aborting the reign of the Novgorodian prince’s father.

The miraculous icon dwelt in the Church of the Transfiguration on Ilyina Street for 186 years afterwards. Later it was moved in a church in honour of the sign on the Holy Virgin, built specially for the icon. The last isn't preserved, as in 1682 it was replaced with the Cathedral of Our Lady of the Sign in Novgorod. In 1992 the icon was moved into the Cathedral of St. Sophia, where it dwells now.

Numerous copies of the icon were well known all around the Russia. Some of them are believed to be miraculous as well. Memory about the miraculous deliverance of Novgorod had been retained in oral tales for a long time.
