= Adashev =

Adashev (Russian: Ада́шев; masculine) or Adasheva (Ада́шева; feminine) is a Russian last name.

There are three theories regarding the origins of this last name. The most plausible one relates it to a Turkic word adaš, meaning namesake, comrade, friend. It is also possible that this last name derives from nickname "Адаш" (Adash), itself derived from a Vologda and Yaroslavl dialectal word "адать" (adat), meaning to cry, to yell. Finally, it could have developed from the diminutive forms of the Christian first names Adrian and Adam.

People with the last name

- Alexey Adashev, friend of Tsar Ivan the Terrible involved in the creation of the Illustrated Chronicle of Ivan the Terrible
- Rajab Adashev, who starred in Abdullajon, a 1991 Uzbek science fiction comedy
- Zarrukh Adashev, Uzbek mixed martial artist

== See also ==
- Adashevo, several rural localities in Russia
