= Ivan Mikhailovich Viskovatyi =

Russian diplomat and statesman (1510s-1570)

Ivan Mikhailovich Viskovatyy
- Иван Михайлович Висковатый
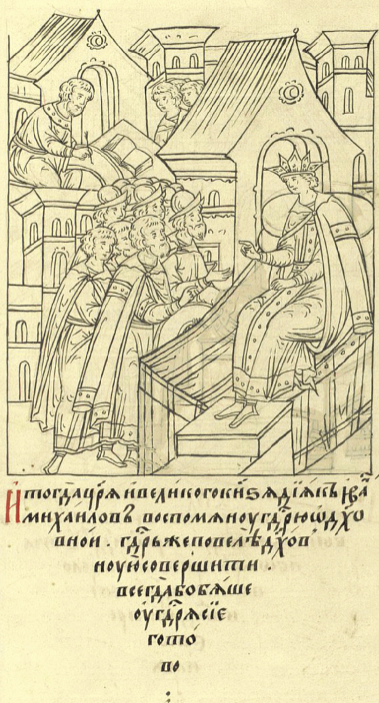
- Viskovatyy addresses Ivan IV on church literacy (miniature from the Illustrated Chronicle of Ivan the Terrible)

Head of the Posolsky Prikaz
- In office 1549–1570
- Monarch: Ivan the Terrible
- Succeeded by: Andrey Shchelkalov

Keeper of the Great Seal
- In office 1561–1570
- Monarch: Ivan the Terrible

Personal details
- Born: c. 1510s–1520s
- Died: 25 July 1570 Moscow, Tsardom of Russia

Ivan Mikhailovich Viskovatyy (Viskovatov; Иван Михайлович Висковатый (Висковатов); c. 1510s – 25 July 1570) was a Russian diplomat and statesman. He was the first head of the Posolsky Prikaz (the foreign office of the Tsardom of Russia) and served as Keeper of the Seal (pechatnik) under Ivan the Terrible.

== Early life and rise ==
Viskovatyy was born into a family of provincial petty gentry (deti boyarskie), with ancestral landholdings in the Pereyaslavl and Kolomna districts. He first appears in surviving state records on 19 March 1542 as a junior clerk (podyachy), when he transcribed a truce treaty with the Grand Duchy of Lithuania.

In 1549, during the administrative reforms of Ivan IV, the Tsar appointed Viskovatyy a state clerk (dyak) and placed him in charge of diplomatic affairs, an event traditionally regarded as the founding of the Posolsky Prikaz.

== Diplomatic career ==
Throughout the 1550s, Viskovatyy and Alexei Adashev directed Russian foreign policy. Viskovatyy oversaw diplomatic communications during the Russian conquests of the Khanate of Kazan (1552) and the Astrakhan Khanate (1556). Following the arrival of Richard Chancellor in Moscow in 1553, he conducted negotiations that led to the establishment of the English Muscovy Company and the grant of commercial privileges in 1555. He also systematised the diplomatic archive and introduced the practice of keeping formal diplomatic registers (posolskie knigi).

In 1561, Viskovatyy was appointed Keeper of the Seal (pechatnik), uniting custody of the state seal with administration of foreign policy, and entered the Boyar Duma. This dual role became standard practice for foreign office heads into the 17th century. In 1562–1563, he led an embassy to Denmark to negotiate Baltic treaties before the Northern Seven Years' War, and in 1566 he took part in the Zemsky Sobor.

== Political and religious disputes ==
During Ivan IV's serious illness in 1553, Viskovatyy was among the first officials to swear allegiance to the Tsar's infant son Dmitry, opposing the faction supporting Prince Vladimir of Staritsa. In 1554, he served on the boyar commission that investigated Prince Semyon Rostovsky for high treason.

At the church councils of 1553–1554, in what became known as the Viskovatyy affair, he protested against archpriest Sylvester and Metropolitan Makary over the orthodoxy of newly commissioned allegorical icons in the Moscow Kremlin. The council rejected his criticisms and sentenced him to a three-year church penance for questioning ecclesiastical authority.

== Downfall and death ==
Viskovatyy retained his offices through the 1560s, but was arrested in 1570 during the oprichnina purges. Following the sack of Novgorod, he was accused of treason, specifically of conspiring to surrender Novgorod to King Sigismund II Augustus of Poland and Astrakhan and Kazan to the Ottoman Empire and the Crimean Khanate.

On 25 July 1570, Viskovatyy was publicly executed in Moscow. His wife was subsequently forced to take monastic vows. His successor as head of the Posolsky Prikaz was Andrey Shchelkalov.
