= Chosen Council =

Russian advisory body (1547–1560)

The Chosen Council (Russian: Избранная рада, romanized: Izbrannaya rada) is the informal name given to the government of Ivan the Terrible during the early years of his reign as the tsar of all Russia, from 1547 to 1560.

== History ==
According to the traditional view, the council was formed in 1547 after the fire of Moscow. Ivan placed Aleksey Adashev in charge of the council while the priest Sylvester and other advisors served on the council. Ivan ruled the country with these advisors. After the death of Ivan's wife Anastasia in 1560, Ivan lost faith in the council. Although historians disagree on the exact status of the council, it is generally considered that this council formed the government and it may have been an attempt at balancing the tsar's powers with those of the higher aristocracy.

The Chosen Council became an instrument of reform. The governors of provinces were required to share the presiding chair at provincial courts with the pomeshchiki, the service nobility. By 1555, many of the governors had been dismissed and replaced with elected representatives, while the dues paid to them were passed to the Chosen Council.

In 1553, while Ivan suffered from illness, the Chosen Council selected Ivan's cousin Vladimir of Staritsa as his successor; however, Ivan recovered and later used this as evidence of a conspiracy against him.

== Membership ==
The Chosen Council, according to the traditional point of view, was led by Aleksey Adashev and Sylvester. This notion of these two having significant power mainly comes from the correspondence between Ivan and Andrey Kurbsky, as well as the Illustrated Chronicle. The name itself was first used by Kurbsky in his writings to the tsar. As a result, scholarly opinions on the membership of the Chosen Council is divided. Kurbsky has been regarded as a leading figure, but some historians have disputed his membership in the council, for example Ruslan Skrynnikov. The exact status of the council has also been a point of contention, with many scholars identifying it with the blizhnyaya duma (privy council).

== Sources ==
- Feldbrugge, Ferdinand J. M. (2 October 2017). "The Chosen Council". A History of Russian Law: From Ancient Times to the Council Code (Ulozhenie) of Tsar Aleksei Mikhailovich of 1649. BRILL. pp. 790–791. ISBN 978-90-04-35214-8.
- Fomin, V. N. (2008). "Избранная рада". Большая российская энциклопедия. Том 10: Железное дерево — Излучение (in Russian). Большая российская энциклопедия. pp. 745–746. ISBN 978-5-85270-341-5. Archived from the original on 30 August 2025.
- Maland, David (11 November 1982). Europe in the Sixteenth Century. Bloomsbury Publishing. ISBN 978-1-349-06263-8.
- Perrie, Maureen; Pavlov, Andrei (10 July 2014). Ivan the Terrible. Routledge. ISBN 978-1-317-89468-1.
- Wren, Melvin C.; Stults, Taylor (8 January 2009). The Course of Russian History, 5th Edition. Wipf and Stock Publishers. ISBN 978-1-60608-371-0.
