= Blessed Be the Host of the King of Heaven =

Russian Orthodox icon

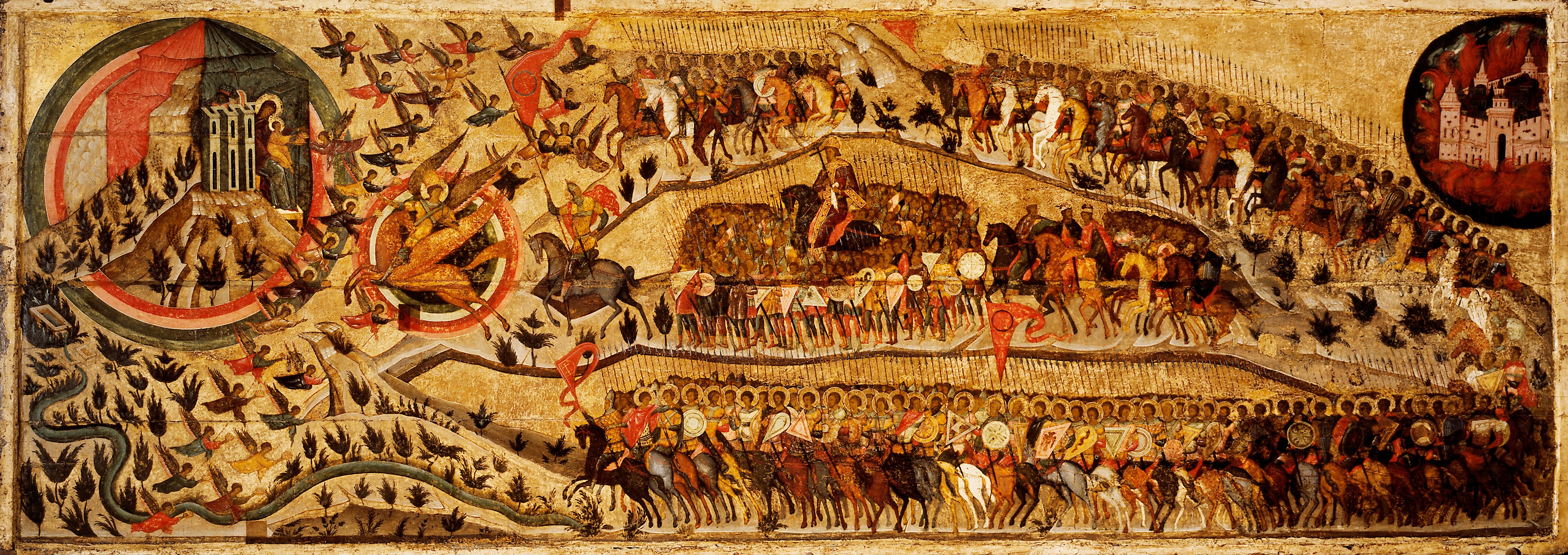
Ecclesia militans, one of the largest icons in existence

Blessed Be the Host of the King of Heaven (Russian: Благословенно воинство Небесного Царя), also known in Soviet-era nomenclature as "The Church Militant" (Церковь воинствующая), is a grand Russian Orthodox icon commemorating the conquest of Kazan by Ivan IV of Russia (1552).

Measuring almost four meters in width, "Host of the King of Heaven" is one of the largest icons ever produced in medieval Russia. It has been attributed to Ivan's confessor Andrew (later known as Athanasius, Metropolitan of Moscow).

The icon shows Ivan the Terrible as he follows the Archangel Michael in leading the triumphant Russian troops away from the conquered city in flames (symbolising both Kazan and Sodom). In the top left corner of the icon the Mother of God with the infant Jesus is shown seated outside the heavenly gate of Jerusalem (symbolising the city of Moscow) and distributing crowns to messenger angels who proceed to reward the martyrs of Ivan's army.

This unusually sophisticated iconography has generated a plethora of interpretations. It is often assumed that the Tsar is followed by his ancestors such as Dmitry Donskoy and other Grand Princes of Vladimir. This interpretation is based on The Tale of the Princes of Vladimir, an early 16th-century treatise highlighting Ivan's illustrious and ancient pedigree. The icon was displayed next to the royal seat in the Dormition Cathedral of the Moscow Kremlin (the main church of the Tsardom of Russia).

The original icon from the 1550s is now on display in the Tretyakov Gallery. A smaller 16th-century copy, formerly set on the tomb of Grand Duke Sergei Alexandrovich in the Chudov Monastery, has been preserved in the Moscow Kremlin museum.

== See also ==
- Saint Basil's Cathedral - another monument to Ivan's conquest of Kazan, also illustrating the idea of a heavenly Jerusalem
- Battle of the Novgorodians with the Suzdalians - another military subject of Russian icons

== Sources ==
- Квливидзе Н. В. Благословенно воинство Небесного Царя // Православная энциклопедия. — М. — Т. 5. — С. 324—325.
- Кочетков И. А. К истолкованию иконы «Церковь воинствующая»: («Благословенно воинство небесного царя») // Труды Отдела древнерусской литературы. — Л.: 1985. — Т. XXXVIII. — С. 185—209.
- Морозов В. В. Икона «Благословенно воинство» как памятник публицистики XVI века // Государственные музеи Московского Кремля. Материалы и исследования. — М.: 1984. — В. 4: Произведения русского и зарубежного искусства XVI — начала XVIII века. — С. 17—31.
