= Sylvester (priest) =

Russian Orthodox priest

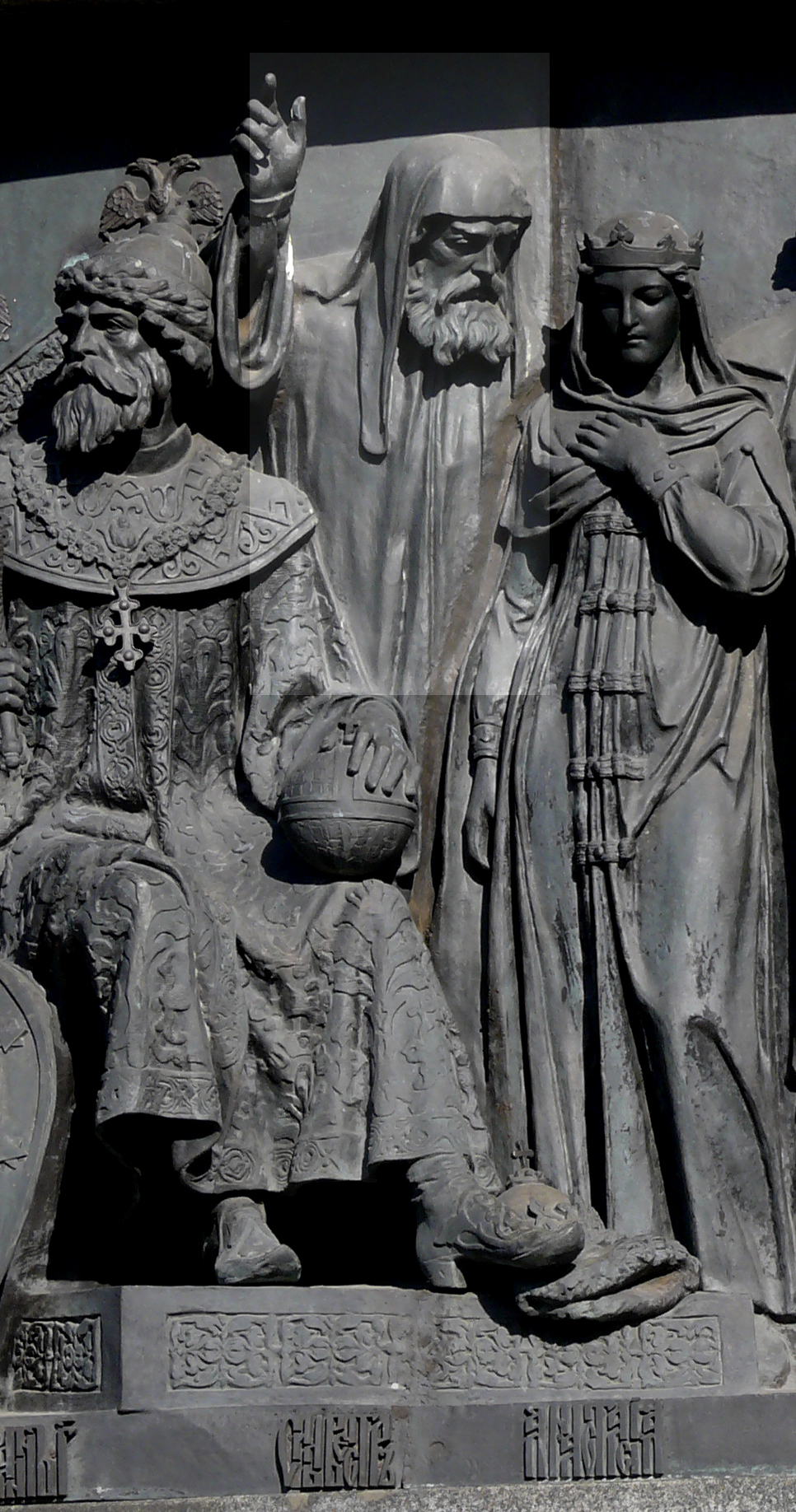
- Sylvester in the Millennium of Russia monument in Veliky Novgorod
- Died: Between 1574 and 1580
- Religion: Russian Orthodox
- Occupation: Priest

Sylvester (Russian: Сильвестр, romanized: Silvestr; later known as Spiridon) was a priest of the Cathedral of the Annunciation and a close advisor to Ivan IV. Sylvester is known for heavily influencing Ivan and the contemporary Russian government alongside Alexei Adashev and their Chosen Council from 1549 to 1560. His power was mostly unchallenged during this time, with the exception of the Viskovatyi affair, but that was quickly solved in his favor. He eventually fell out of favor with the Tsar in 1560 and withdrew to the Kirillov monastery in Beloozero before moving to the Solovetskii monastery, at some point changing his name to Spiridon and later dying before 1580. He is later described by Ivan as a traitor and conspirator.

== Early life ==
The details of Sylvester's early life are largely unknown, as most biographical information on him is from inscriptions in books he donated to religious institutions. He was born sometime in the late 15th century, but it is not known where. Originally, he was not Ivan's confessor, but likely a follower of Metropolitan Makarii, as it was he who appointed Sylvester to the Cathedral of the Annunciation. It is known, however, that he operated a workshop in Novgorod with connections to the Cathedral alongside his son, Anfim, where he presumably acquired his skill at copying, trading manuscripts, and icon painting, before moving to Moscow at an unknown time. The earliest records of him being a priest in the Cathedral of the Annunciation are from 1545, so it is likely he moved to Moscow shortly before then. Sometime in the years 1545 and 1546, he gave a service book to the Aleksandrov hermitage and asked them to pray for him and his family.

== Time in Moscow ==
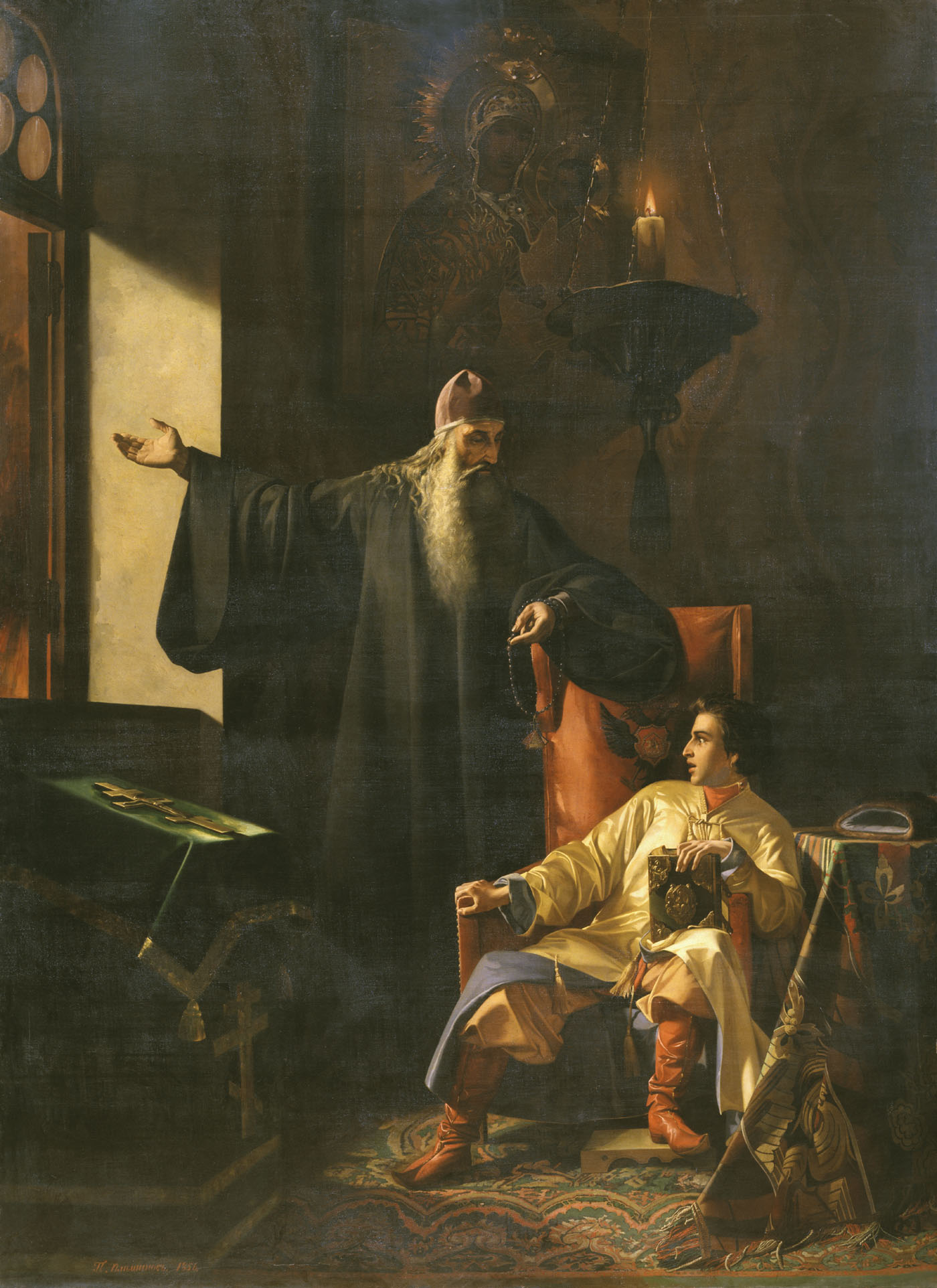
Sylvester with Ivan the Terrible during the 1547 Fire of Moscow, painting by Pavel Pleshanov (1856)

=== Rise to power ===
Sylvester's influence on Ivan began as early as when he warned Ivan to expel any sodomites from his court in 1545. However, he truly began to rise to power after the Moscow fire and uprising of 1547, when Sylvester warned Ivan IV that the disaster was supposedly God's judgement for the Tsar's sins, such as being overly indulgent on women, alcohol, and minstrels and too lenient on homosexuals; Ivan thoroughly believed him, and from this point until around 1560, Ivan was mentally dependent on Sylvester's council. After the fire, Sylvester supervised the renovation of the churches burned down from 1547 to 1553. The renovations were carried out by artisans he and his wife had bought out of slavery and educated. In 1553, when Ivan the Terrible fell sick and Prince Vladimir Staritsky tried to visit him, the boyars would not allow it until Sylvester forced them to, gaining further favor with the Tsar and his family.

=== Chosen Council ===
The years between 1549 and 1560 are known as the period of the Chosen Council, or more accurately, the government of Sylvester and Adashev. This is because the Chosen Council was made up of Sylvester, Adashev, and their supporters, with no dissenting voices. During this time period, the Council governed everything going on in Russia, with the tsar and the Council working in complete harmony; by 1553, Sylvester was described as all-powerful by his contemporaries. Interestingly, this was despite the fact that the Council held no official power. Although they were simply an advisory council, Sylvester and the Chosen Council kept Ivan and the court entirely in check during their rule, with very few records of drunken and/or sexual misbehavior among the court and the smallest number of executions within it and Ivan's family occurring during their time in control. Sylvester used his power mostly to push for a stricter religious society within Russia, advocating for the accelerated Christianization of Kazan and urging the Tsar to cast his sinful vices away. Sylvester also pushed for nonviolence and peace with Poland-Lithuania, which ultimately contributed to his downfall.

=== Viskovatyi affair ===
In June 1553, a priest named Simeon came to Sylvester to ask for advice, as a boyar Matthew Bashkin and his compatriot Fedor Kosoi were expressing their anti-Trinitarian and heretical views against the Orthodox church in their iconography in the religious buildings they restored under Sylvester's supervision. Sylvester decided they must denounce the two to the Tsar, and Ivan ordered an investigation, which linked Bashkin's friend Artemii and his student Porfirii, as well as many other priests, to the heresy. The punishment of Porfirii is unknown, but Artemii was sent to the Solovetskii monastery, while Kosoi and Bashkin were sentenced to imprisonment at the Volokolamsk monastery. Both Artemii and Kosoi escaped to Lithuania, but Bashkin died in Volokolamsk.

Months later in October 1553, a d'iak named Ivan Viskovatyi accused Sylvester of sharing the views of Bashkin and Kosoi. Sylvester was able to disprove this accusation and have Viskovatyi punished with three years of penance for making unjust accusations, allowing Sylvester to escape the affair with no negative consequences. Whether he was truly innocent, or guilty and held too much power to be deemed so, is a matter of debate among historians.

=== Loss of favor ===
Sylvester began to lose favor with the Tsar when he allied himself with the peace party in the late 1550s when the Livonian War began to develop. He was staunchly against the war, and sent a letter to Prince Alexander Gorbaty-Shuisky criticizing Ivan's warlike tendencies, which may have led to the extermination of Alexander's male bloodline during the beginning of the oprichnina. Sylvester and the Tsaritsa Anastasia had a mutual dislike for each other, and following her death in 1560, accusations were made that Sylvester and Adashev poisoned her. While there is evidence that she was poisoned, it was extraordinarily unlikely that Sylvestor or Adashev had a hand in it. Regardless, Sylvester withdrew to the Kirillov monastery in Beloozero, with no documented direct pressure from Ivan.

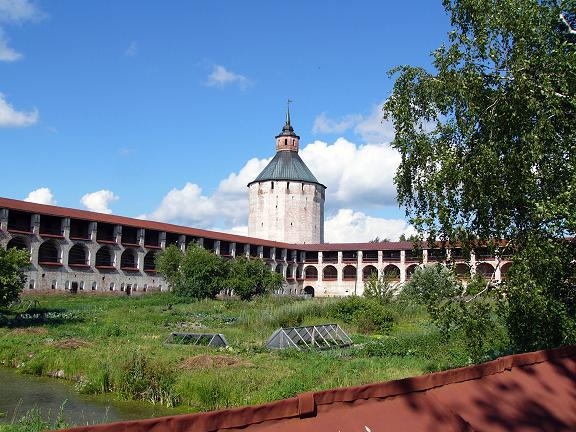
Kirillov monastery

== Monastery life ==
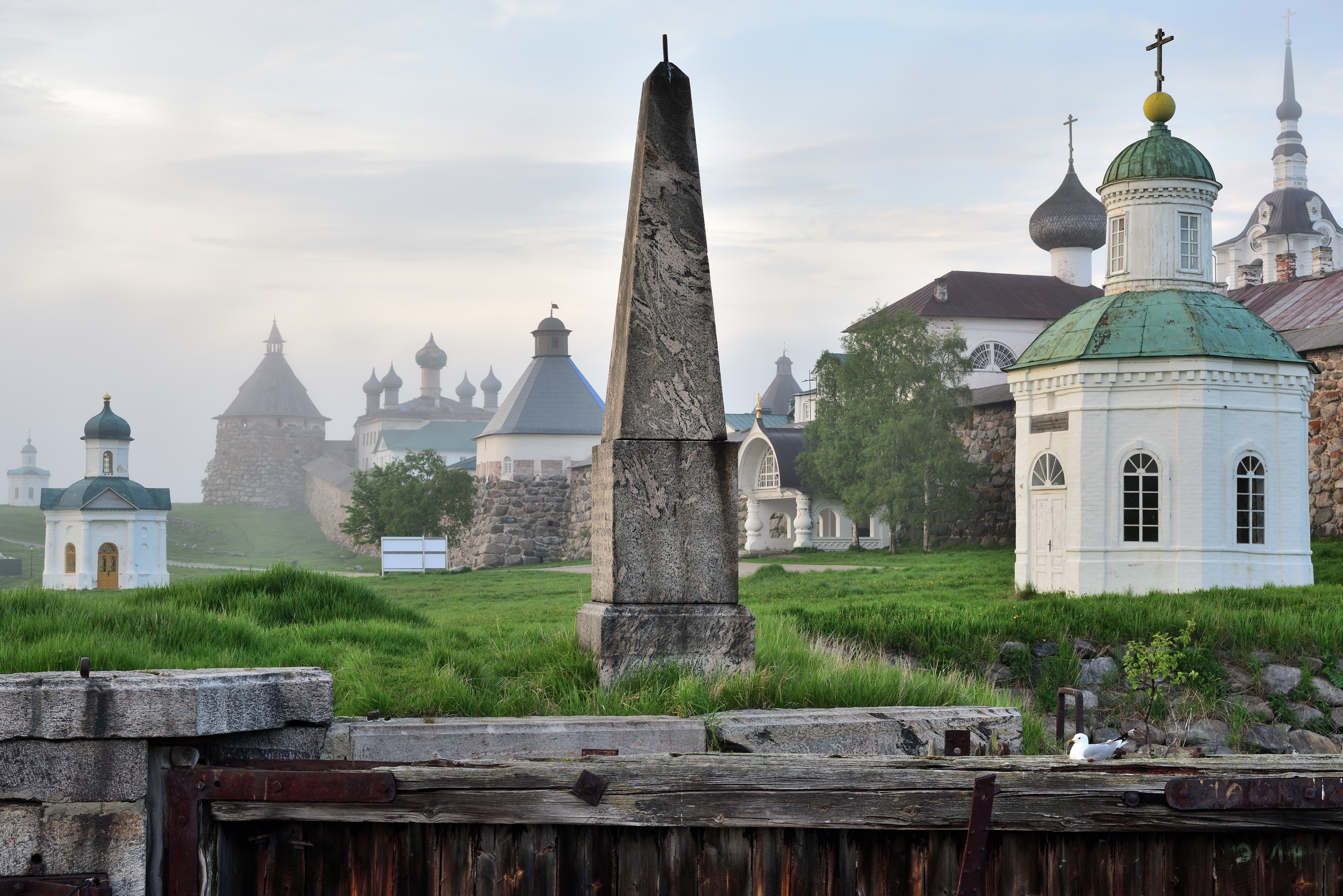
Solovetsky Monastery

Sylvester's time at the Kirillov monastery is largely undocumented. It is not known if he took the name Spiridon before or after leaving Kirillov, nor is it known why. It is known, however, that he moved to the Solovetskii monastery by 1566, as he is documented visiting Moscow with the monastery to celebrate the promotion of Solovetskii's former hegumen Filipp to metropolitan in July 25 of 1566. During his time at Solovetskii, Sylvester copied six books for the monastery by 1570 before moving to a house maintained by the Solovetskii monastery in Vologda with some other monastery elders. Sylvester donated ten rubles to the Solovetskii monastery in 1574 or 1575, and that is the last record of him before his death. When this death occurred is not precisely known, but it must have been before 1580, as the Kirillov monastery recorded his and his son's legacy in that year, so they both must have been dead prior.

== Ivan's letter to Kurbsky ==
While Sylvester was in either the Kirillov or Solovetskii monastery in July 1564, Ivan sent a letter to Prince Andrei Kurbsky where he spoke of Sylvester and his influence on Ivan in great detail. In the letter, Ivan accuses Sylvester of using the promise of spiritual guidance to manipulate him, therefore supplying himself with his unofficial but nevertheless substantial political power. According to Ivan, he and Alexei Adashev met in secret with the Chosen Council out of malice towards Ivan with the end goal of turning the boyars against Ivan. Ivan was not known for his sanity, however, and there is no evidence aside from his word to point towards a boyar conspiracy against him. Ivan also accuses Sylvester and Adashev of trying to raise Prince Vladimir of Staritsa to the throne during the dynastic crisis of 1553 when Ivan fell ill, but Sylvester had little to do with the crisis at all and Adashev swore allegiance to him as soon as he was asked. Furthermore, the validity of the existence of the crisis is debatable. Ivan also makes the claim that Sylvester stirred up hatred against the former tsaritsa Anastasia, but while it is known that Sylvester and she shared a mutual dislike of one another, there is no evidence to show he ever acted against her. Ivan then states that he let Sylvester leave to Beloozero and left his son unbothered to allow God to exact his judgement on the supposed conspirator, and that is the last time he is mentioned in Ivan's writings.
