= Pavel Pleshanov =

Russian painter (1829–1882)

- Павел Плешанов
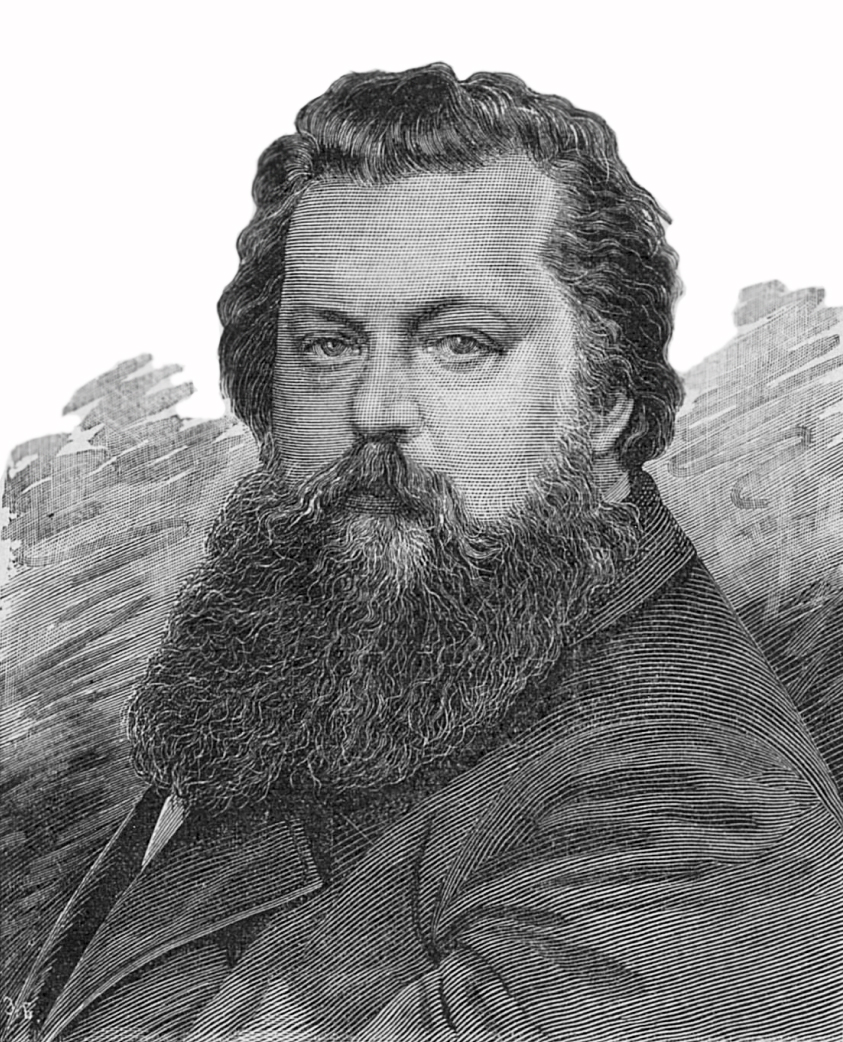
- Pleshanov in Vsemirnaya Illyustratsiya
- Born: May 18, 1829; Saint Petersburg
- Died: November 9, 1882 (aged 53); Saint Petersburg
- Education: Member Academy of Arts (1856); Professor by rank (1869)
- Alma mater: Imperial Academy of Arts (1854)
- Known for: Painting

Pavel Fyodorovich Pleshanov (Russian: Павел Фёдорович Плешанов; (1829—1882) was a Russian portrait and history painter. Member of the Imperial Academy of Arts.

== Biography ==
His father was a wealthy merchant. After graduating from the Imperial Commercial College, he decided to devote himself to art instead and enrolled at the Imperial Academy of Fine Arts in 1848. While there, he also took private lessons from Fyodor Bruni.

In 1854, he was awarded a gold medal and, the following year, received the title of "Artist" for his painting of Jesus at the home of Martha and Mary. On Bruni's advice, he spent two years studying in Rome. In 1856, he was named an "Academician" for his depiction of the priest Sylvester with Ivan the Terrible during the Fire of Moscow.

After his father's death in 1867, the family's affairs fell into the hands of his older brother who, through mismanagement or extravagance, soon left them without means. As a result, he had to leave the family mansion. Fortunately, he was able to get a teaching position at the Academy and moved into an apartment there.

Although he was temperamentally unsuited to teaching, he was named a Professor in 1869 for his version of the death of the Tsarevich Dmitri. In 1877, he became a member of the Academy's governing board. Following the death of Leopold Bonafede, he was appointed to the chair of mosaics.

Despite his career successes, he was dissatisfied because he had to paint by commission, rather than what he chose and, eventually, being the sole support of his indebted brother's family took its toll in the form of an enlarged heart, which led to his death at the age of fifty-three.

== Works ==
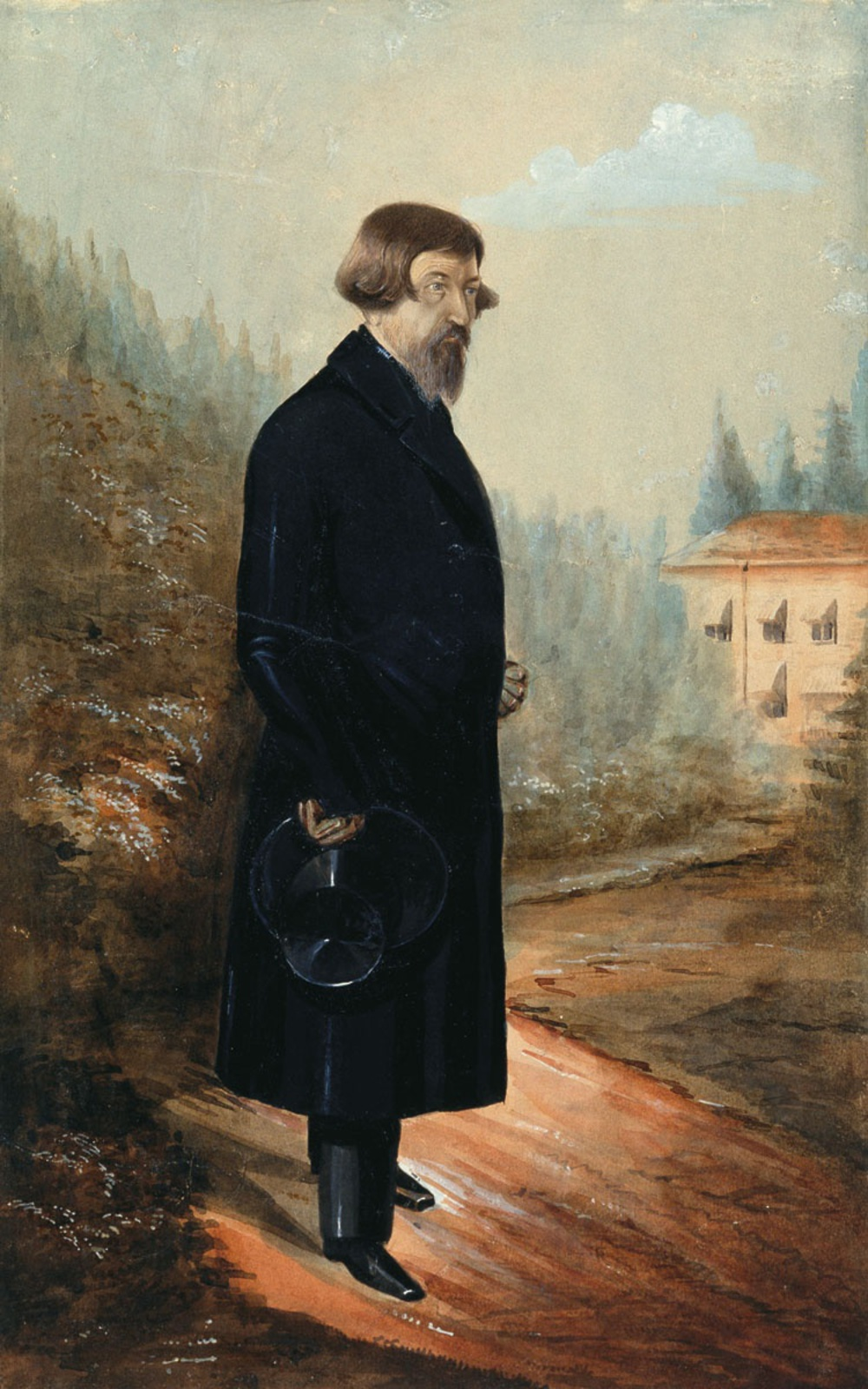
Portrait of a merchant. Artist's father - Fedor Pleshanov (1865)

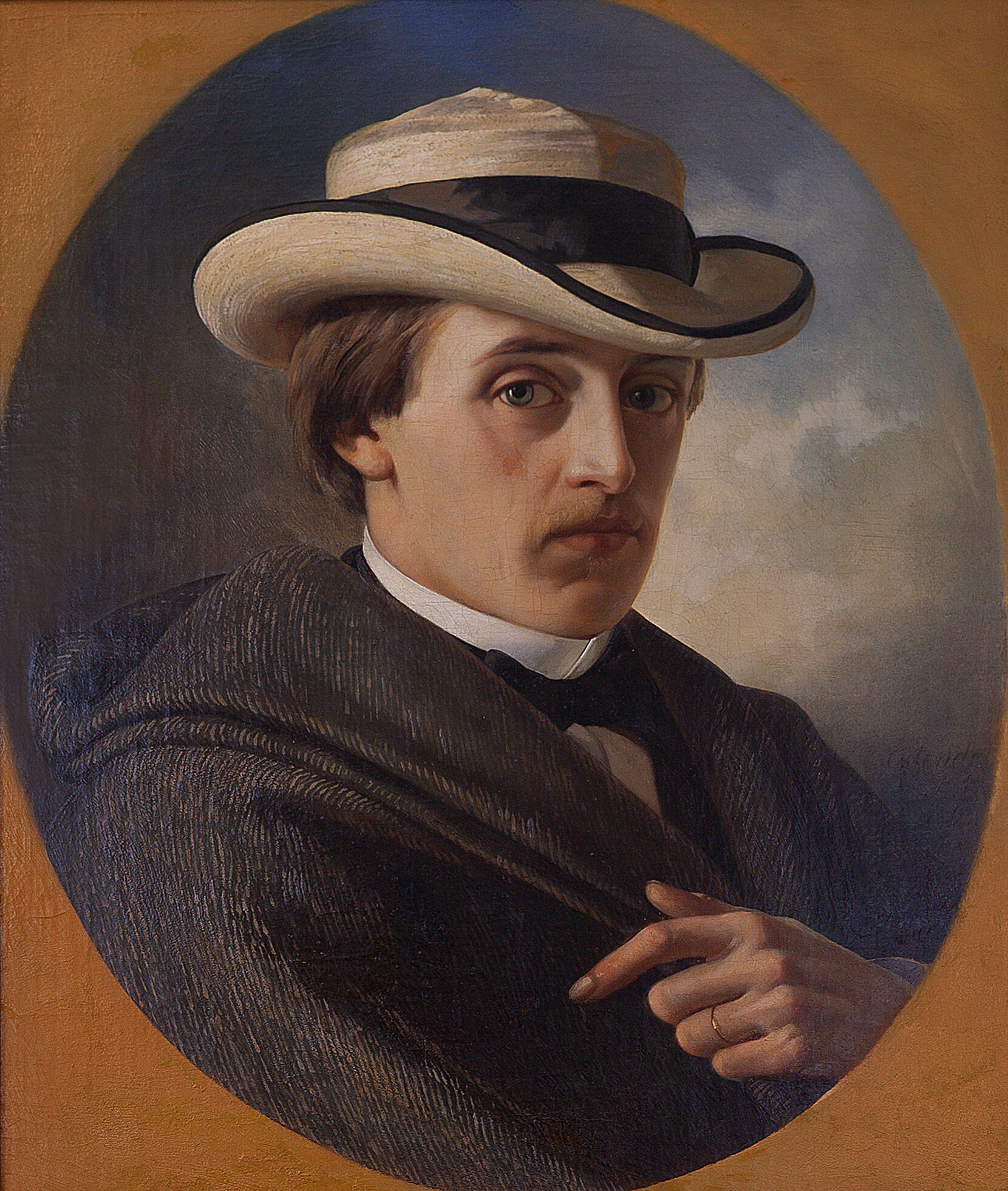
Self-portrait (1863)

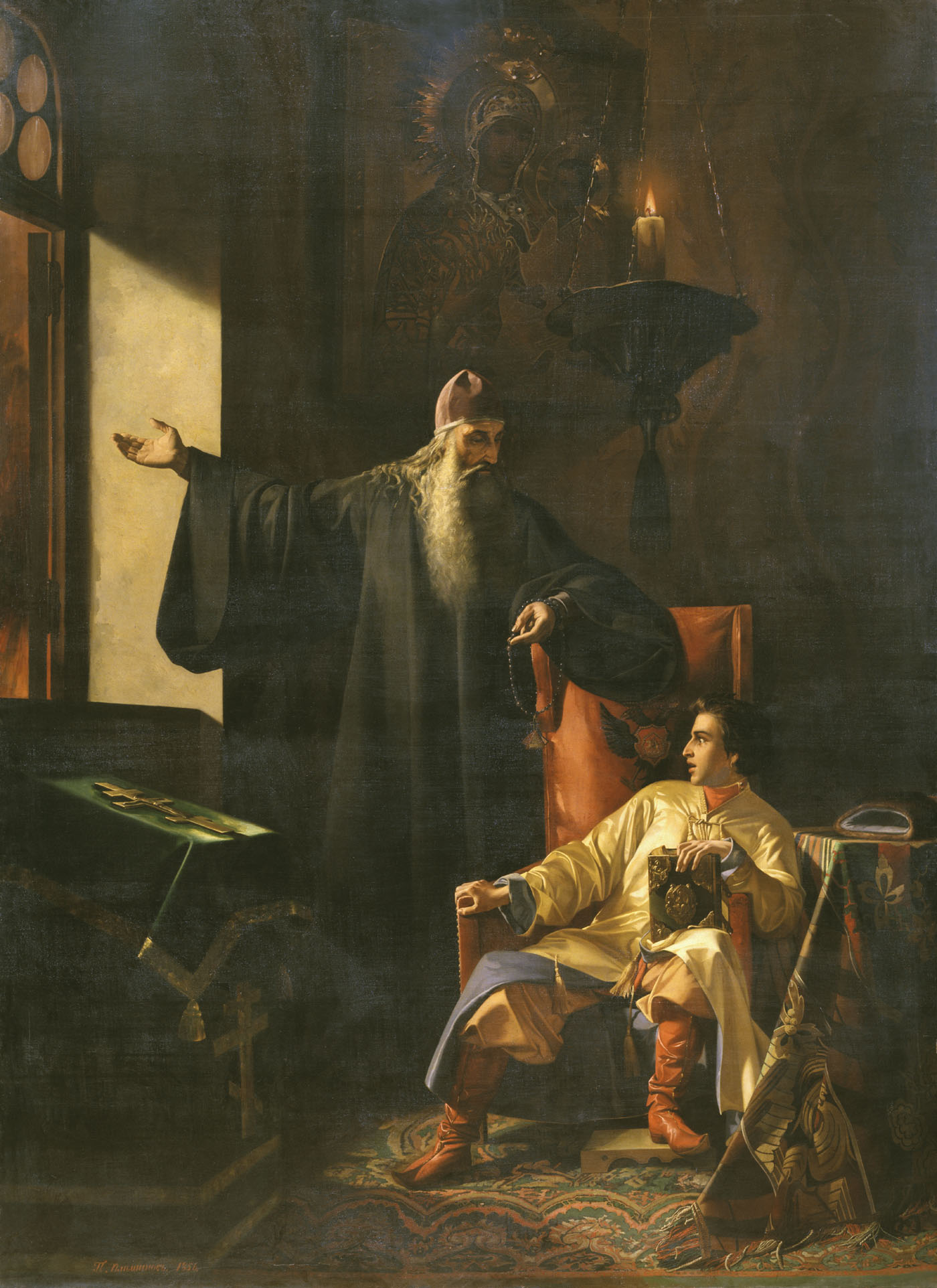
The Priest Sylvester and Ivan the Terrible During the Moscow Fire of 1547 (1856)

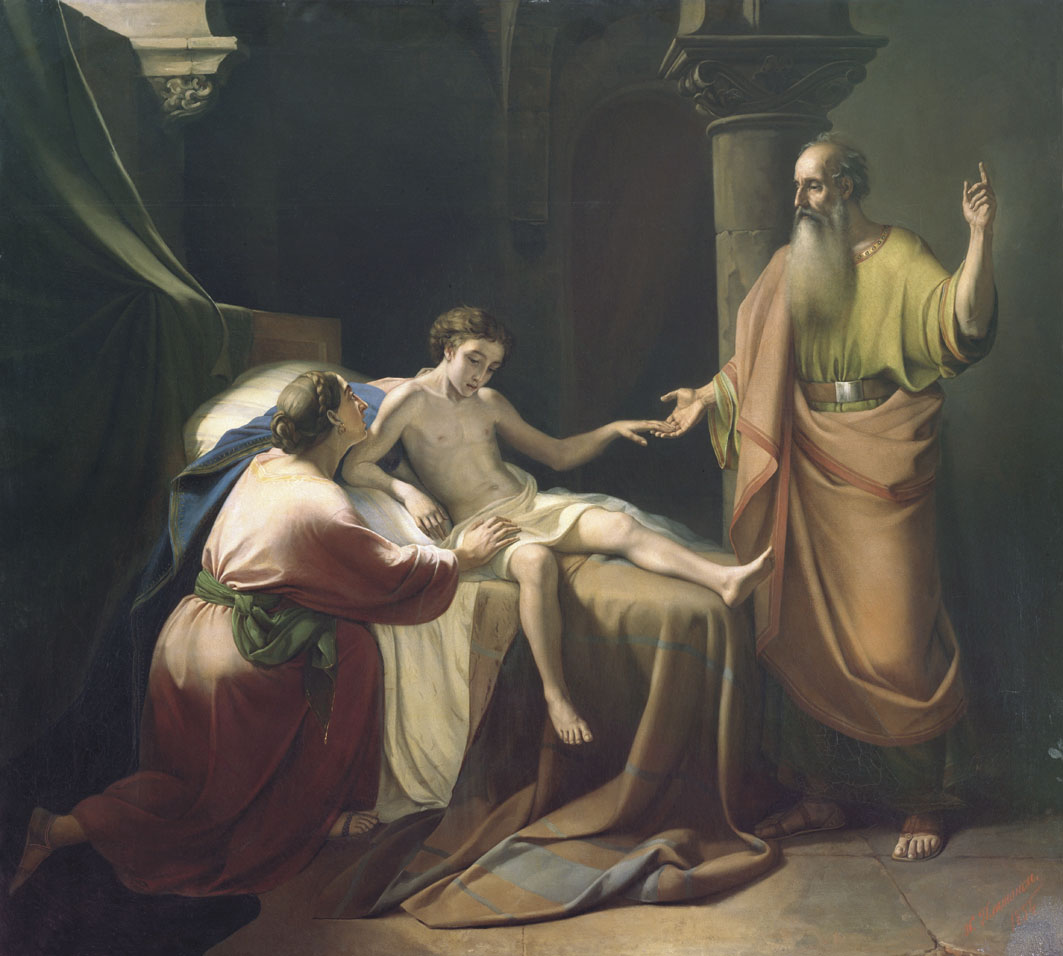
The resurrection by the prophet Elisha of son of Woman of Shunem (1854)

== Literary sources ==
- С. Н. Кондаков (1915). Юбилейный справочник Императорской Академии художеств. 1764-1914 (in Russian). Vol. 2. p. 154.
