= Fire of Moscow =

Fire of Moscow may refer to:

- Fire of Moscow (1547) blamed on the tsar's maternal relatives from the Glinski family
- Sack of Moscow (1571) by Crimean Tatars
- Fire of Moscow (1812) concurrent with Napoleon's occupation
