= Dmitry Gerasimov =

Russian translator and diplomat

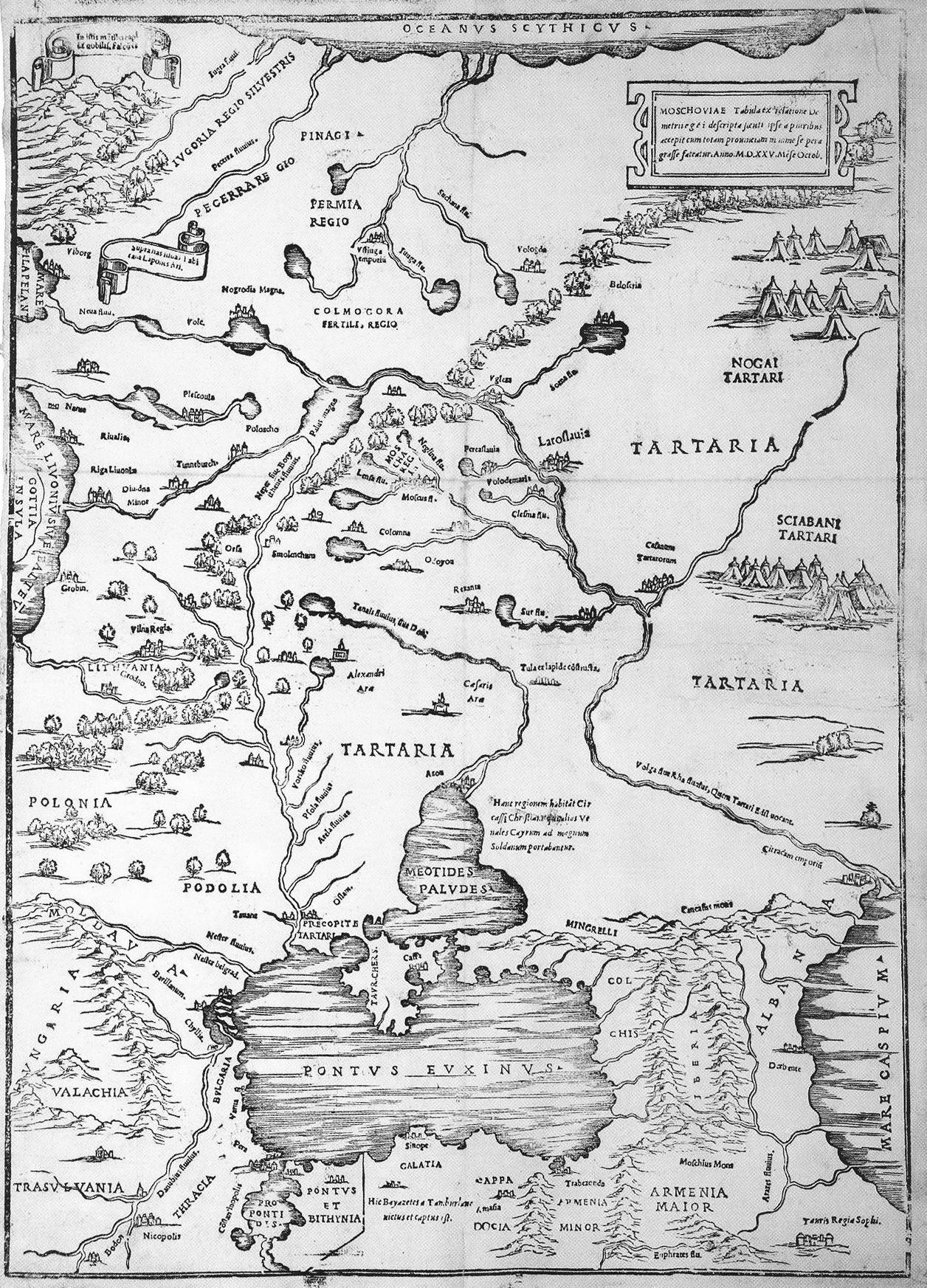
Map of Muscovy by Battista Agnese illustrating Giovio's Muscovite Embassy and created after the data given by "Ambassador Demetrius" Gerasimov

Dmitry Gerasimov (Russian: Дмитрий Герасимов; also known as Demetrius Erasmius, Mitya the Translator and Dmitri the Scholastic; c. 1465 – after 1535) was a Russian translator, diplomat and philologist; he also provided some of the earliest information on Muscovy to Renaissance scholars such as Paolo Giovio and Sigismund von Herberstein.

== Career ==
Gerasimov presumably lived in Novgorod for most of his life and worked mainly with Novgorodian clerics. In his youth he studied in Livonia, where he learnt Latin and German. These languages he put to extensive use in his translations of religious texts (including Hieronymus' comments on the Vulgate, commentary on the Psalter compiled by Bruno of Würzburg, and some tracts aimed at combating the Sect of Skhariya the Jew), and as an interpreter on Muscovite embassies to Emperor Maximilian I, Prussia, Sweden and Denmark. In 1525 he was an ambassador in his own right to Pope Clement VII, when the Grand Duke Vasily III desired to join the anti-Ottoman League. During his stay in Rome, Dmitri related details to Giovio of the geography of Russia and the northern countries. This information was compiled by Giovio into a separate book, and subsequently mapped by Battista Agnese in Venice and was a pattern for most 16th-century maps of Muscovy.

Gerasimov also translated Ars grammatica by Aelius Donatus, juxtaposing the Latin grammar against that of Church Slavonic and proposing a terminology for Slavic grammar. He was a prominent collaborator of Maximus the Greek, Greek-born humanist Michael Trivolis who worked in Russia.

It is widely held that Gerasimov was the Russian translator of the Maximilianus Transylvanus' Letter on Magellan voyage.

== See also ==
- The Tale of the Princes of Vladimir

== Sources ==
- Leo Bagrow. At the Sources of the Cartography of Russia // Imago Mundi, Vol. 16, 1962 (1962), pp. 33–48
- Der russische Donat: Vom lateinischen Lehrbuch zur russischen Grammatik. Hrsg. und komment v. V. S. Tomelleri. Köln, 2002
- Tomelleri V. S. Il Salterio commentario di Brunone di Würzburg in area slavo-orientale: Fra traduzione e tradizione (con unè appendice di testi), München, 2004.
