= Church of the Transfiguration on Ilyina Street =

Building in Novgorod Oblast, Russia

Coordinates: 58.5169°N 31.2969°E

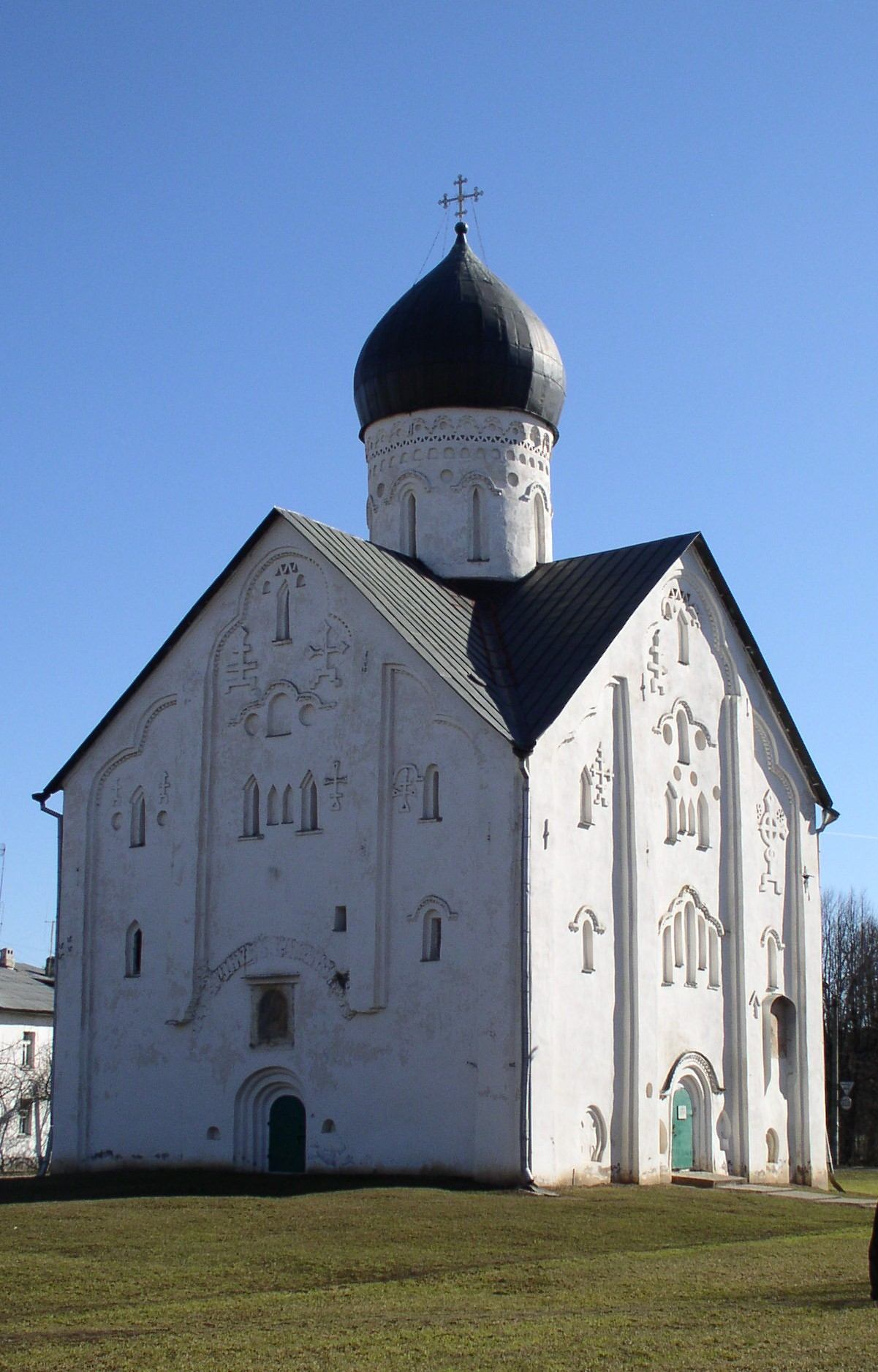
The Church of the Transfiguration on Ilin Street, Novgorod the Great

The Church of the Transfiguration of the Savior (Russian: Церковь Спаса Преображения на Ильине улице) is a former Russian Orthodox Church that stands on Ilyina (Elijah) Street in Veliky Novgorod just east of the Marketplace. The current building was built in 1374 and frescoed by Theophanes the Greek (Feofan Grek or Феофан Грек in Russian) in 1378. Substantial portions of those frescoes still remain, including the Christ Pantocrator in the dome, a number of saints inside the south entrance, and The Old Testament Trinity in the western vestry, as well as others. The current building is now a museum, part of the Novgorod State Museum-Preserve.

== History ==
A church stood on the site since at least the 12th century. The Icon of Our Lady of the Sign was originally housed there. According to a famous legend, in 1169, Archbishop Ilya brought the icon out of the church and across the Volkhov River to the Detinets during a siege of the city by the Suzdalians. The icon is said to have miraculously saved the city. Because of this, the icon and the broader episode came to symbolize the city and its independence, and were depicted in several icons of the battle, one of which is on display in the Novgorod Museum in the Detinets. The icon itself was later transferred to the Church of Our Lady of the Sign, which was built in the latter 17th century next to the Church of the Transfiguration especially to house the icon. It was kept in a museum during the Soviet period and is now housed in the Saint Sophia Cathedral where it is displayed just in front of the main iconostasis.

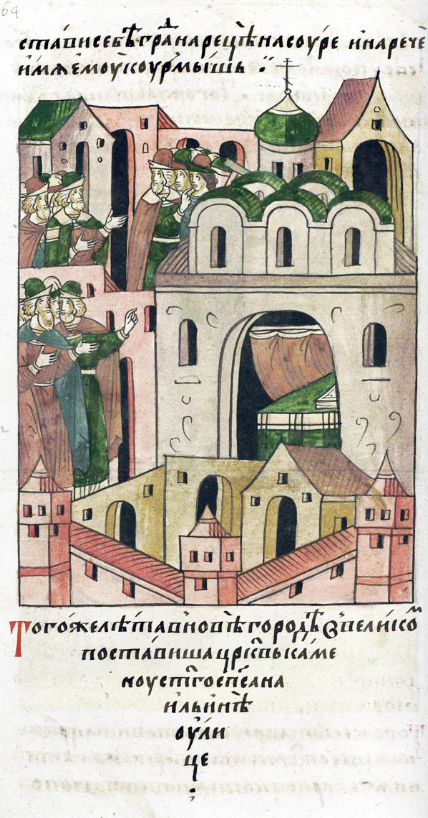
The construction of the church is mentioned in the Illustrated Chronicle of Ivan the Terrible

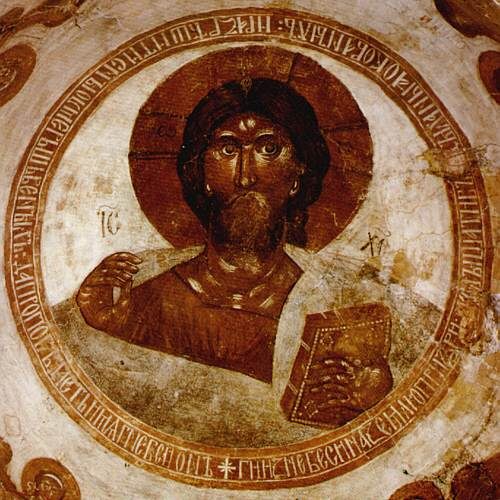
The fresco of Christ Pantocrator in the dome, painted by Theophanes the Greek in 1378.

In addition to being something of a pilgrimage site for the famous icon, the chronicles also note that the Church of the Transfiguration on Ilin Street, which stood just inside the eastern gates of the city, was often the place where the Novgorodians met their archbishop or other dignitaries upon their arrival in the city from Moscow (for instance, after the archbishop's consecration or following other trips to that city, or when Byzantine or other church dignitaries such as the metropolitan visited the city.) It was one of the first places a traveler would come to in the city as he passed down Ilyin Street to the market or passed over the great bridge into the Detinets. Thus, the clergy and the people, displaying icons and crosses, often met their archbishop there and then processed with him through the market and over the bridge to the cathedral and archiepiscopal palace in the Detinets.
