= Battista Agnese =

Genoese cartographer (c. 1500 – 1564)

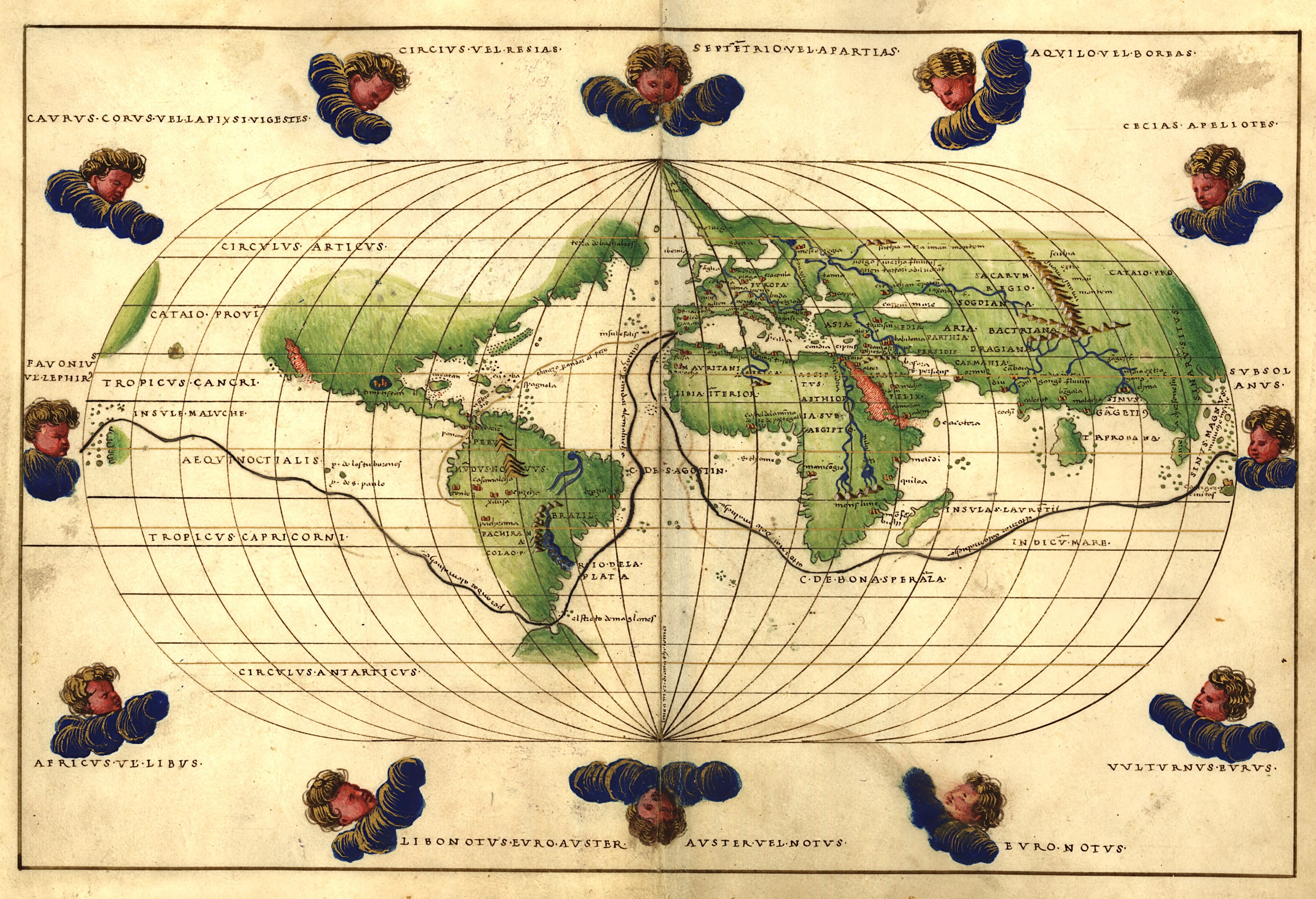
Worldmap from the Portolan Atlas by Battista Agnese (1544)

Battista Agnese (c. 1500 – 1564) was a cartographer from the Republic of Genoa, who worked in the Venetian Republic.

== Career ==
In 1525, he prepared an early map of Muscovy that was based on the geographical data, narrated to Paolo Giovio by the Russian ambassador Dmitry Gerasimov.

His workshop produced at least 71 manuscript atlases of sea charts between 1534 and 1564, more cheaply than Dieppe maps but still considered of fine craftsmanship. The charts normally included latitude but not longitude, along with various decorative features.

One of Agnese's best-known works is an atlas of the world commissioned by Charles V for his son, Philip II. Apparently produced around 1542, it depicts Baja California correctly as a peninsula (60 years later cartographers started to show California as an island).

Agnese liked to incorporate the new geographical discoveries in his maps. For example, he included in his world map the route of the voyage of Ferdinand Magellan, and the route to Peru via the Isthmus of Panama, where a lot of the Spanish gold was found.

The King-Hamy map held at the Huntington Library was once thought to date to c. 1502. More recent analysis has shown it to be a map by Agnese, produced in c. 1552. It appears to be a historical map designed by Agnese to show the image of the world in the early stages of the European expansion.

== Sources ==
- Van Duzer, Chet (2022), The King-Hamy Chart at the Huntington Library: A Historical Map Made by Battista Agnese, doi:10.21001/itma.2022.16.14, ISSN 1888-3931
- Levenson, Jay A. Circa 1492: Art in the Age of Exploration. Washington: National Gallery of Art, 1993.
- Short, John Rennie. The World Through Maps: A History of Cartography. Toronto: Firefly Books, 2003.
- Library of Congress: Agnese Atlas. Portolan atlas of 9 charts and a world map, etc. Dedicated to Hieronymus Ruffault, Abbot of St. Vaast. (1544)
- Atlas de Battista Agnese, 1544, digitized in Biblioteca Digital Hispánica, Biblioteca Nacional de España
- John Carter Brown Library, digitized images from the Atlas of Portolan Charts.
