= Great Menaion Reader =

Russian Orthodox menologium

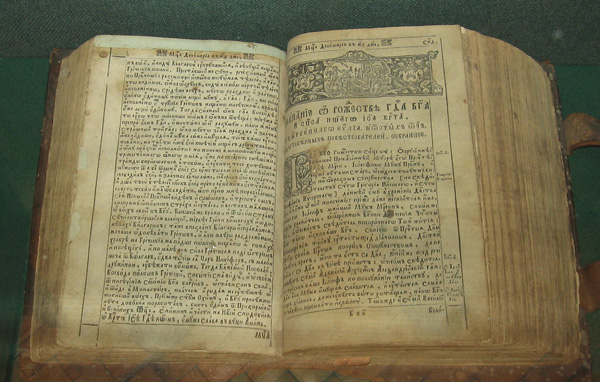
Dimitry of Rostov's Great Menaion Reader (1714)

The Great Menaion Reader (Russian: Великие Четьи-Минеи, romanized: Velikiye Chet’yi-Minei) is the official Russian Orthodox menologium, i.e., a collection of biblical books with interpretations of exordiums, patericons, translated or original hagiographies of Russian saints, works of church fathers, and Russian ecclesiastical writers.

Each of the twelve volumes corresponds to a certain month (hence, the name chet’yi-minei or monthly readings, from the Greek word menaion) and subdivided into days. Also, the Great Menaion Reader includes the so-called kormchiye knigi (books of guidelines, a.k.a. books of the helmsman), monastic charters, acts, and missives. All of this material is sorted by months.

The Great Menaion Reader was compiled in the 1530s-1540s under the supervision of Metropolitan Macarius of Moscow. The Great Menaion Reader contains over 27,000 large-size pages copied by hand and artistically decorated. Metropolitan Macarius decided to compile the Great Menaion Reader for the purpose of centralizing the cult of the Russian saints and consolidation of ecclesiastic ideology, so no Russian secular literature was included.

== Manuscripts ==
- The first manuscript, known as the "Sophia" version, was given to the Saint Sophia Cathedral in Novgorod in 1541.
- While Metropolitan of Moscow from 1542 - 1563, Macarius commissioned additional lives of saints who had been recognized as national patrons at the Church Councils of 1547 and 1549, for a second expanded manuscript of the anthology, which he gave to the Moscow Kremlin Cathedral of the Dormition in 1552.
- A third manuscript was prepared between 1550 and 1554 for presentation to Tsar Ivan the Terrible.

The Great Menaion Reader was revised and expanded by Dimitry of Rostov in the early 18th century. His version is still used by the Russian Orthodox Church.
