= The Tale of the Princes of Vladimir =

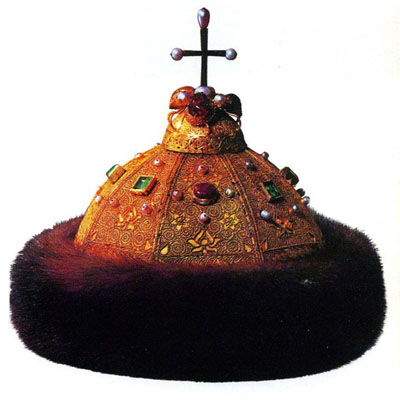
The Tale alleged that Monomakh's Cap was an ancient relic from the Eastern Roman Empire

The Tale of the Princes of Vladimir (Russian: Сказание о князьях Владимирских, romanized: Skazanie o knyazyakh Vladimirskikh), also known as The Tale of the Grand Princes of Vladimir of Great Russia, (Note: Russian: Сказание о великих князьях Владимирских Великой Руси.) is a Russian literary monument of the early 16th century. It contains a genealogy of the Muscovite princely family and therefore the Rurik dynasty.

It has been attributed either to Dmitry Gerasimov or Pachomius the Serb, among other learned monks. Along with the Book of Royal Degrees, it was used by Ivan IV of Russia to legitimize his claim of being the rightful ruler of all Orthodox Christians. In particular, it was used to strengthen the authority of the grand prince, and then tsar.

== Description ==
The Tale appears for the first time in 1523. Some historians have dated it to the late 15th century, specifically after 1480, but others do not find this convincing. Aleksandr Zimin dated it to the end of the 15th century and did not name a specific person as the author of the Tale, but he did not consider Pachomius the Serb to be the author. According to Aleksandr Goldberg, the original author was Dmitry Gerasimov, a Russian diplomat "capable of embodying in concrete form the new historical and political ideas that had developed in Moscow's ruling circles". Goldberg believed that the original version was written in the 1510s or 1520s.

The Tale starts off with the Biblical Flood and the Tower of Babel, which is then followed by a list of great rulers of the past, beginning with the rulers of Egypt. The first legend of the Tale traces the male-line descent of the princes of Vladimir, and hence of Moscow, to not only Rurik, but also from a certain Prus. The Tale says that following the death of Julius Caesar, his brother Augustus succeeded him and was crowned in Egypt. After conquering the world, he sent his brother called Prus to the Vistula. It then says: "And Prus lived a very long time, until the fourth generation, and until now these lands are called the Prussian lands". From this, Gostomysl, the ruler of Novgorod, advised his subjects on his "death bed to send to Prussia for a ruler, and they did so and found Riurik". According to the legend, from Prus descends Rurik, and from Rurik descend the princes of Vladimir.

The second legend included in the Tale tells of the story of Monomakh's Cap, a purported imperial crown which Vladimir Monomakh obtained from Emperor Constantine IX Monomachos. According to the legend, after his victory, Vladimir received the regalia of Byzantium, including the Cross of Christ, the imperial crown, the pelerine, and the box of carnelian, "out of which the Emperor Augustus had derived great joy... From that time onward the princes of Vladimir had themselves crowned with the Imperial Crown".

The Tale provided the ideological background for Ivan IV's coronation as the first Russian tsar. For instance, it was included as an introductory article to the rite of Ivan's coronation as tsar. During his reign, Ivan constantly stressed the Rurikovich descent from August, for example in negotiations with Poland–Lithuania and Sweden. It also inspired Athanasius, Metropolitan of Moscow, to compile the famous Book of Royal Degrees. The tsar's place for praying in the Dormition Cathedral of the Moscow Kremlin was decorated with a set of bas-reliefs illustrating the Tale.

== Sources ==
- Cizevskij, Dmitrij (April 1971). History of Russian Literature from the Eleventh Century to the End of the Baroque. Walter de Gruyter GmbH. pp. 251–252. ISBN 978-3-11-128343-2.
- Dmitrieva, Rufina P. (1989). "Сказание о князьях владимирских". In Likhachev, Dmitry S. (ed.). Словарь книжников и книжности Древней Руси. Вып. 2 (вторая половина XIV – XVI в.). Ч. 2: Л–Я. Наука.
- Madariaga, Isabel de (25 September 2006). Ivan the Terrible. Yale University Press. ISBN 978-0-300-11973-2.
- Terras, Victor (1 January 1985). "Skazanie o knyaz'yakh Vladimirskikh". Handbook of Russian Literature. Yale University Press. p. 420. ISBN 978-0-300-04868-1.
