= Athanasius, Metropolitan of Moscow =

Metropolitan of Moscow from 1564 to 1566

Athanasius
- Metropolitan of Moscow and all Russia
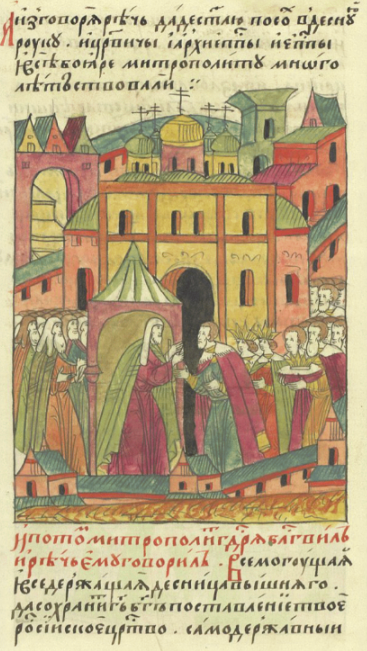
- Afanasy blesses Ivan the Terrible
- Church: Russian Orthodox Church
- See: Moscow
- Installed: March 1564
- Term ended: May 1566
- Predecessor: Macarius
- Successor: Philip II

Personal details
- Died: 1570s

Athanasius (Russian: Афанасий; secular name: Andrey; died 1570s) was Metropolitan of Moscow and all Rus', the primate of the Russian Orthodox Church, from March 1564 to May 1566. He was the eleventh metropolitan in Moscow to be appointed without the approval of the Ecumenical Patriarch of Constantinople as had been the norm.

== Biography ==
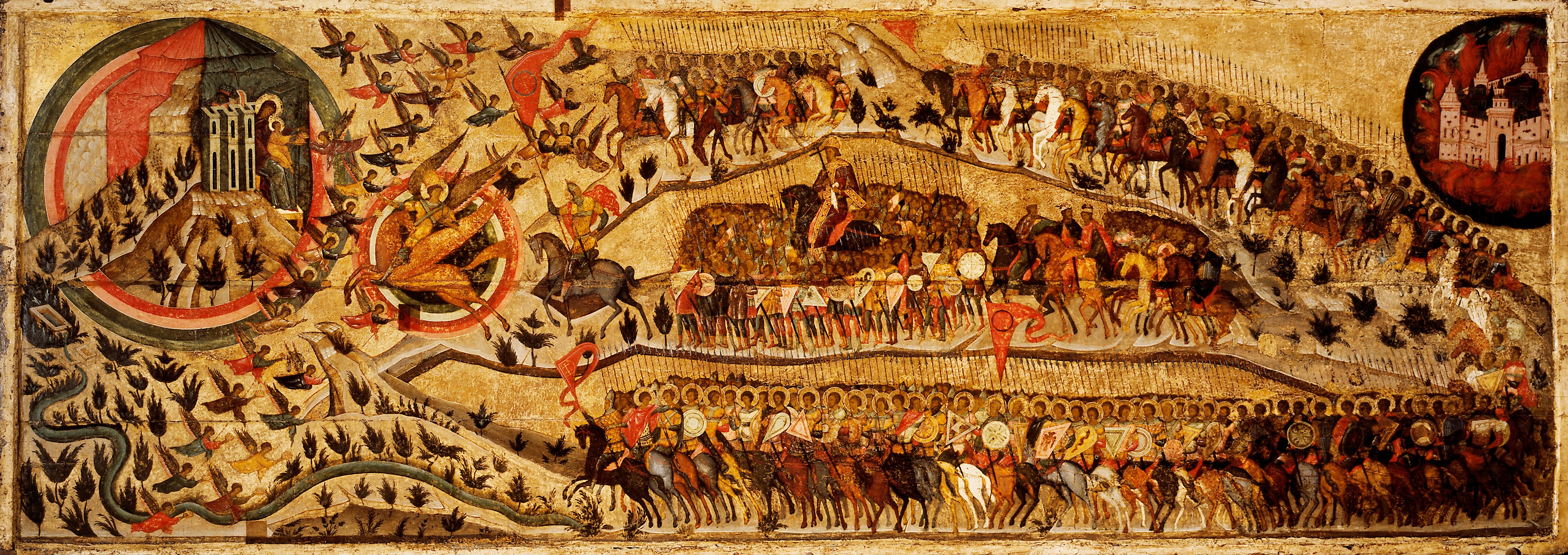
Blessed Be the Host of the King of Heaven, a large icon attributed to Athanasius

In the 1530s to 1540s, Athanasius served as a priest in Pereslavl-Zalessky. From 1549 to 1550, he was appointed the archpriest of the Cathedral of the Annunciation in the Moscow Kremlin and became Ivan the Terrible's personal confessor. Athanasius accompanied the tsar during his military campaign against Kazan in 1552 and held a service during the laying of the foundation stone of the Annunciation Cathedral in that city. He was known as a writer and icon painter.

Athanasius participated in the church sobors of 1553 and 1554 as a witness with regards to the restoration of icons and frescos in the Kremlin cathedrals after the fire of 1547. From 1555 to 1556, Athanasius was engaged in restoring the icon of Nikolai Velikoretsky together with Metropolitan Macarius. In 1567, he participated in the restoration of the icon of Our Lady of Vladimir. It is believed that Athanasius is the author of the icon called The Belligerent Church. Also, he wrote the Life of Daniel of Pereyaslavl (Russian: Житие Даниила Переяславского; 1556–1562) and supposedly the Book of Royal Degrees (between 1560 and 1563).

In 1562, Athanasius was admitted to the Chudov Monastery. In 1564, he was elected Metropolitan of Moscow and all Russia, replacing the deceased Metropolitan Macarius. It was Metropolitan Athanasius to whom Ivan the Terrible would address his message on the introduction of the oprichnina in 1565. Athanasius would often talk to the tsar and express his concern about the disgraced.

Officially, Metropolitan Athanasius left his post due to a "grave sickness", but some Russian historians believe that it was his rejection of oprichnina that would cost him his post. Athanasius moved to the Chudov Monastery and lived there until his death.

Preceded by Macarius	Metropolitan of Moscow and all Rus'	Succeeded by Philip II
