= Adashevo =

Adashevo (Russian: Адашево) is the name of several rural localities in Russia:

- Adashevo, Republic of Mordovia, a selo in Adashevsky Selsoviet of Kadoshkinsky District in the Republic of Mordovia; 53°57′N 44°19′E
- Adashevo, Nizhny Novgorod Oblast, a selo in Chernovskoy Selsoviet of Bolsheboldinsky District in Nizhny Novgorod Oblast; 55°7′N 45°26′E
- Adashevo, Tula Oblast, a village in Studenetsky Rural Okrug of Venyovsky District in Tula Oblast
