= Siege of Novgorod (1170) =

Event in Novgorodian history

Coordinates: 58°33′N 31°17′E

- Part of the aftermath of the 1169 Sack of Kiev
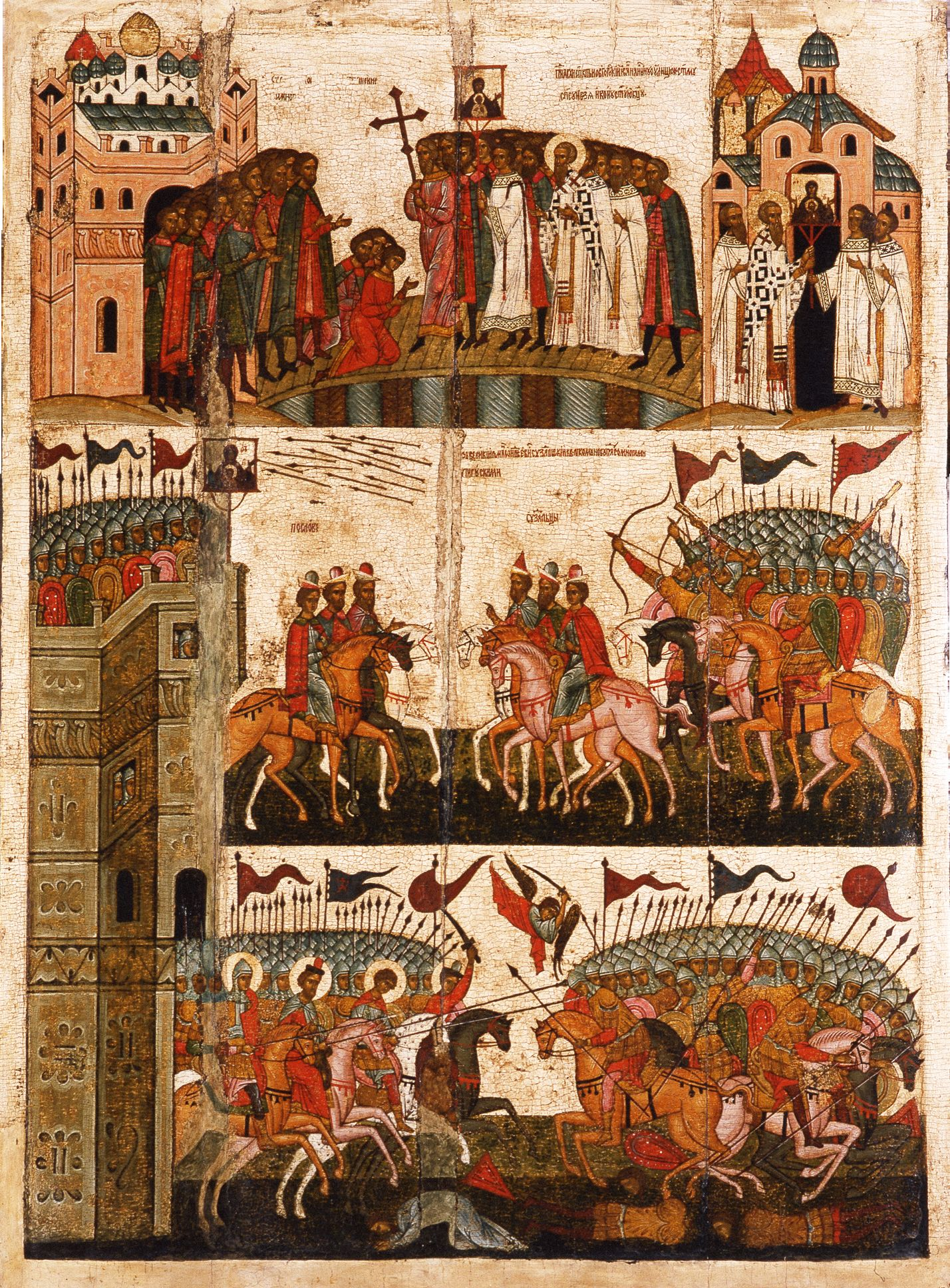
- Battle as shown on Battle of the Novgorodians with the Suzdalians, a mid-15th century Novgorodian icon
Date	1169/1170
Location	Veliky Novgorod, Novgorod Republic, Kievan Rus'
Result	Iziaslavichi–Novgorodian military victory (1169); Suzdalian blockade caused Novgorodians to expel Roman Mstislavich (1170); Rurik Rostislavich of Smolensk became Prince of Novgorod (1170); Yury Bogolyubsky of Suzdalia became Prince of Novgorod (1171)

Belligerents
Iziaslavichi of Volhynia: Principality of Volhynia; Novgorod Republic	Coalition: Yurievichi of Suzdalia; Rostislavichi of Smolensk

Commanders and leaders
Roman "the Great" Mstislavich	Andrey Bogolyubsky; Sviatoslav Rostislavich

The siege of Novgorod (Russian: Осада Новгорода; Belarusian: Аблога Ноўгарада) was a 1169/1170 siege of the city of Veliky Novgorod, capital of the Novgorod Republic, in the aftermath of the Sack of Kiev (1169).

== Background ==
After the Iziaslavichi grand prince Mstislav II of Kiev had been ousted during the Sack of Kiev in March 1169 by a coalition of Rostislavichi (Smolensk), Yurievichi (Suzdalian), and Olgovichi of Chernigovian) princes, the dethroned grand prince's son Roman Mstislavich, prince of Novgorod, was beleaguered by another Yurievichi army sent from Suzdalia by Andrey Bogolyubsky. Unlike their victory at Kiev, the Suzdalians and their allies suffered a crushing defeat at Novgorodian hands.

== The battle in history ==
The episode took place in 1169 when Andrei Bogolyubsky, Prince of Vladimir (on the Kliazma), besieged the city. His protégé in Novgorod, Prince Sviatoslav Rostislavich, had left Novgorod in 1167 upon the death of his father (Grand Prince Rostislav Mstislavich, who had also backed his reign in Novgorod). When the new Kievan grand prince, Mstislav Iziaslavich, sent his son, Roman, to be prince of Novgorod, Andrei fought to return Sviatoslav to the Novgorodian throne, sending his army to besiege Novgorod and force them to drive out Roman and take back Sviatoslav.

The Novgorodians delivered a crushing defeat upon the Suzdalians and their allies.

Bogolyubsky was, in fact, able to place his candidate on the Novgorodian throne the following year. The Novgorodians dismissed Sviatoslav in 1170. Bogolyubsky was, by then, the most powerful prince in Kievan Rus'. He had conquered Kiev and placed his candidate, Gleb, on the grand princely throne there. Andrei then remained the most powerful prince in Rus until his assassination in 1174. Thus, while the Novgorodians felt it had been miraculously delivered from Bogolyubsky's clutches in 1169, their policy of independence from him failed, and they gave in to his policies the following year.

== Aftermath ==
Nevertheless, a subsequent Suzdalian economic blockade of the city prompted the Novgorodians to expel Roman Mstislavich in 1170, after which Andrey selected first Rurik Rostislavich of Smolensk (1170) and then his own son Yury Bogolyubsky of Suzdalia (1171) to become the next princes of Novgorod.

Some time after the siege, a belief sprung up that Novgorod had been miraculously delivered, giving rise to a legend. In the fifteenth and sixteenth centuries, the episode became the basis for several hagiographic tales in the Russian church, as well as two large icons executed in the late fifteenth and early sixteenth centuries (and now housed respectively in the Novgorod Museum and the Russian Museum in St. Petersburg.)

== Bibliography ==
- Martin, Janet (2007). Medieval Russia: 980–1584. Second Edition. E-book. Cambridge: Cambridge University Press. ISBN 978-0-511-36800-4.
