= John II (archbishop of Novgorod) =

Ilya of Novgorod
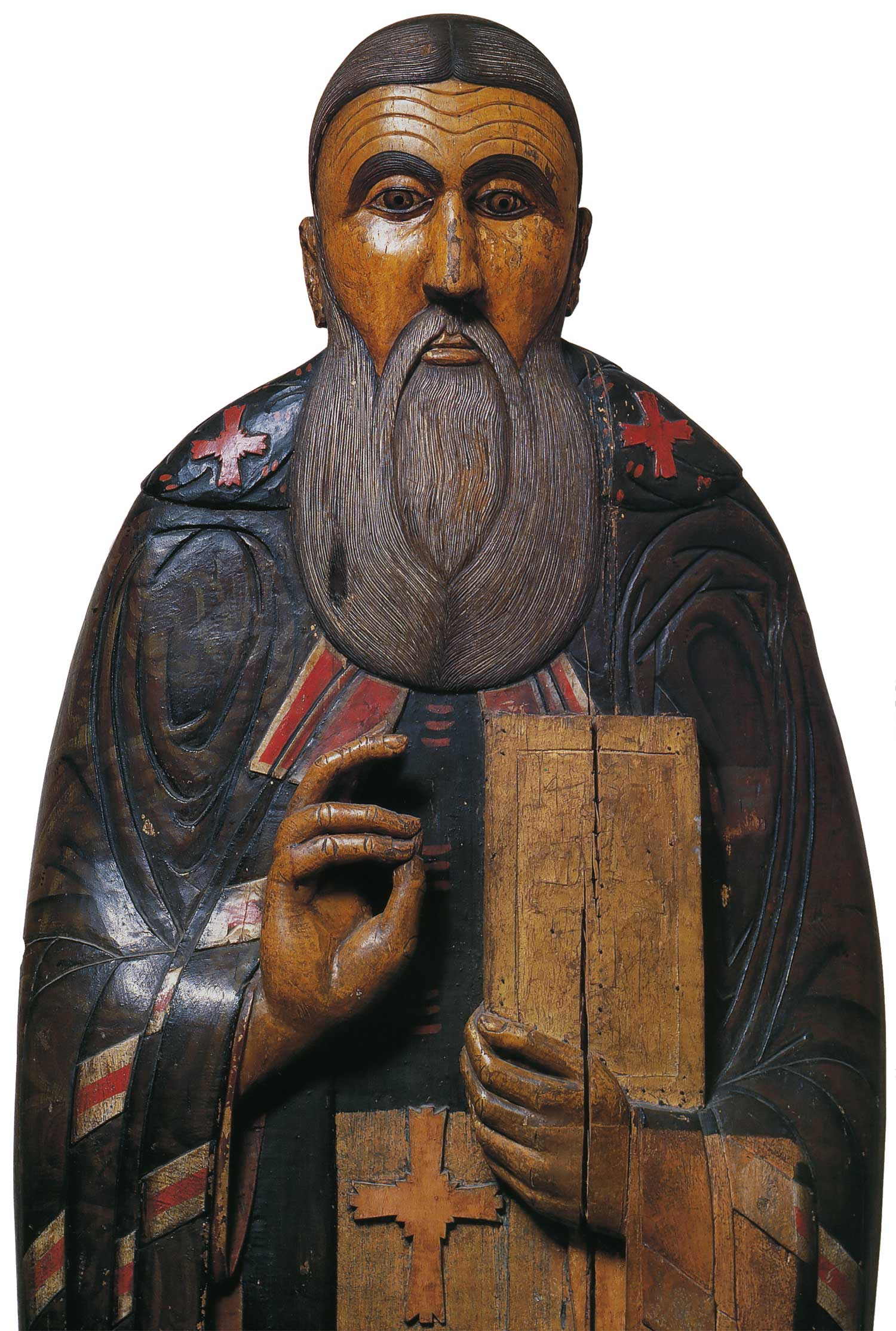
- A wooden effigy from Saint John's reliquary, 1559.
- Died: September 7, 1186
- Other name: Ioann of Novgorod
- Known for: Archbishop of Novgorod from 1165 to 1186

Saint Bishop Ioann II (John) of Novgorod (Russian: Иоанн Новгородский, his name upon entering the Great Schema and the name by which he is known in Russian Orthodox hagiography), before 1185 known as Ilya of Novgorod was Archbishop of Novgorod from 1165 to his death in 1186.

== Life ==
The son of a priest, Ilya was himself priest of the Church of St. Blaise, south of the Novgorod Kremlin. The church was destroyed, rebuilt in 1407, destroyed during the Second World War and rebuilt again. Ilya was probably his first monastic name, and his baptismal name is not known.

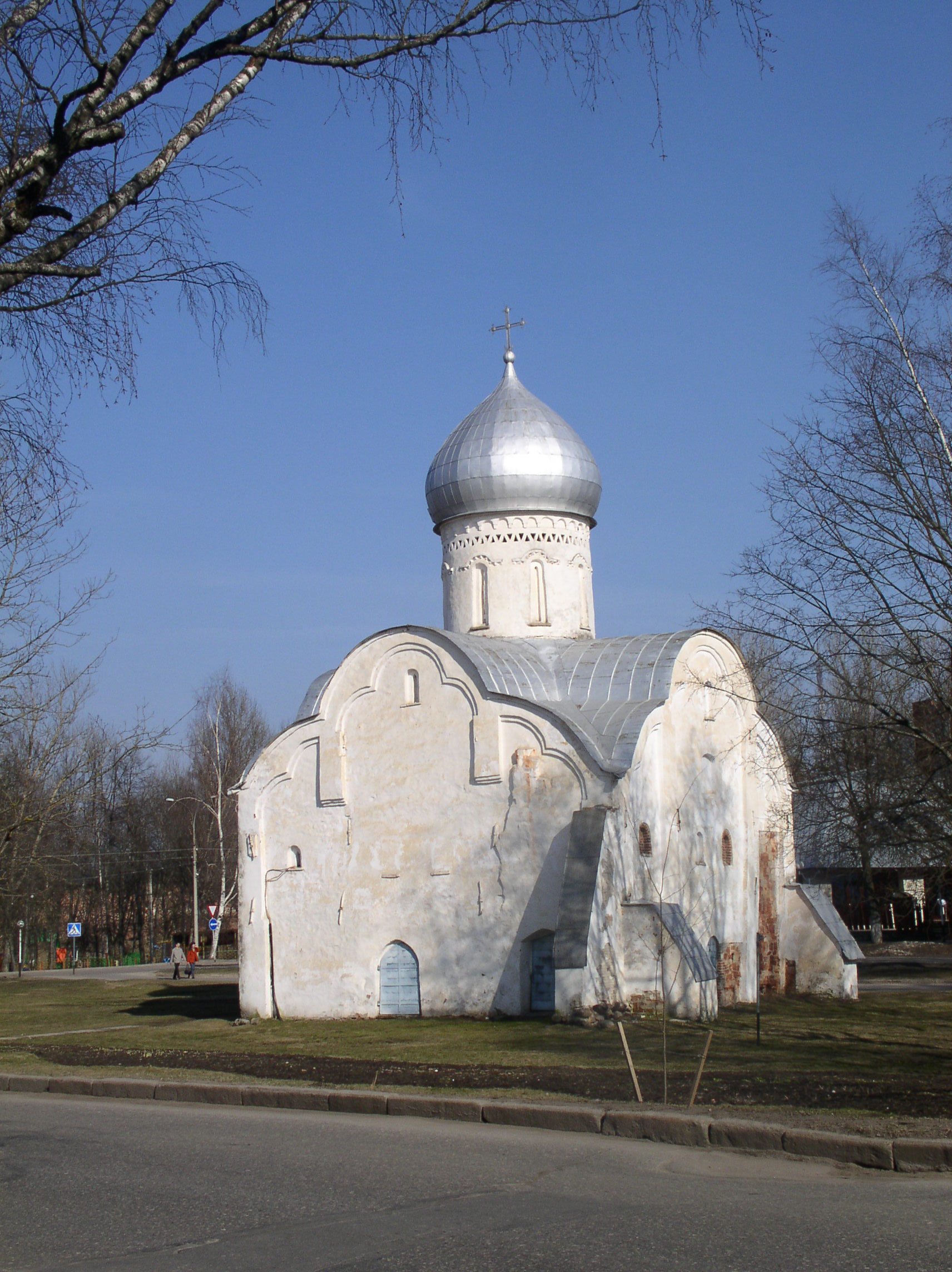
The Church of Saint Blaise, Novgorod the Great; a reconstruction on the site of Ilya's parish church.

Ilya was appointed bishop of Novgorod by Metropolitan Ioann of Kiev in 1165. He was the first to hold the title of archbishop in Novgorod after the office was elevated to the archiepiscopal dignity a few months later. Niphont held the title as a personal honor.

Ilya carried out a number of construction projects in Novgorod along with his brother, Gavril (also known as Grigorii), who succeeded him as archbishop (1186–1193) and consecrated the Khutyn Monastery, among other things.

In 1185 entered the Great Schema and took the name Ioann (John).

John died on September 7, 1186, and was buried in the Cathedral of Holy Wisdom in the west gallery, next to the Predtechenskaia Porch. He was originally buried below the floor in the Martirievskii Porch (where Gavril is still buried), but was later moved. His relics were desecrated during the Soviet anti-religious campaigns on April 3, 1919. They are now in a different sarcophagus with a sarcophagial effigy (from the 1990s) covering it.

John was canonized at the Moscow Council of 1547. His feast day is September 7 in the Julian calendar and September 20 in the Gregorian.

== John in literature and art ==
John appears in a number of medieval tales (some of them set centuries after his death) as the quintessential archbishop of Novgorod. (He is almost always referred to as Ioann in them). The most famous tale depicts him conquering a devil and forcing it to transform itself into a horse and fly him to Jerusalem and back in a single night. In Jerusalem, he took the measurements of the Holy Sepulchre. This tale was developed to explain how a chapel matching the exact measurements of the Holy Sepulchre was established in the Cathedral. John's monastic cell was kept in the archiepiscopal palace and transformed into a church several centuries after his death. The copper washing basin in which he is said to have captured the devil was shown to visitors at least into the early twentieth century.

John is also depicted in the two fifteenth and sixteenth century Icons of the Battle of the Novgorodians with the Suzdalians housed in the Novgorod Museum and the Russian Museum in Saint Petersburg. He is shown bringing the Icon of Our Lady of the Sign from the Church of the Transfiguration on Ilin Street to the Cathedral of Holy Wisdom during the Suzdalian siege of the city in 1169. The Mother of God is said to have saved the city at that time. He is also featured prominently in the tale that surrounds the event and the chronicle accounts of the siege.

John is also depicted in a 19th-century wall fresco in the Pretechenskaia Porch of the Cathedral of Holy Wisdom.

Preceded by Arkady	Archbishop of Novgorod; 1165–1186	Succeeded by Gavril (Grigorii)
