= Book of Royal Degrees =

Russian historical chronicles

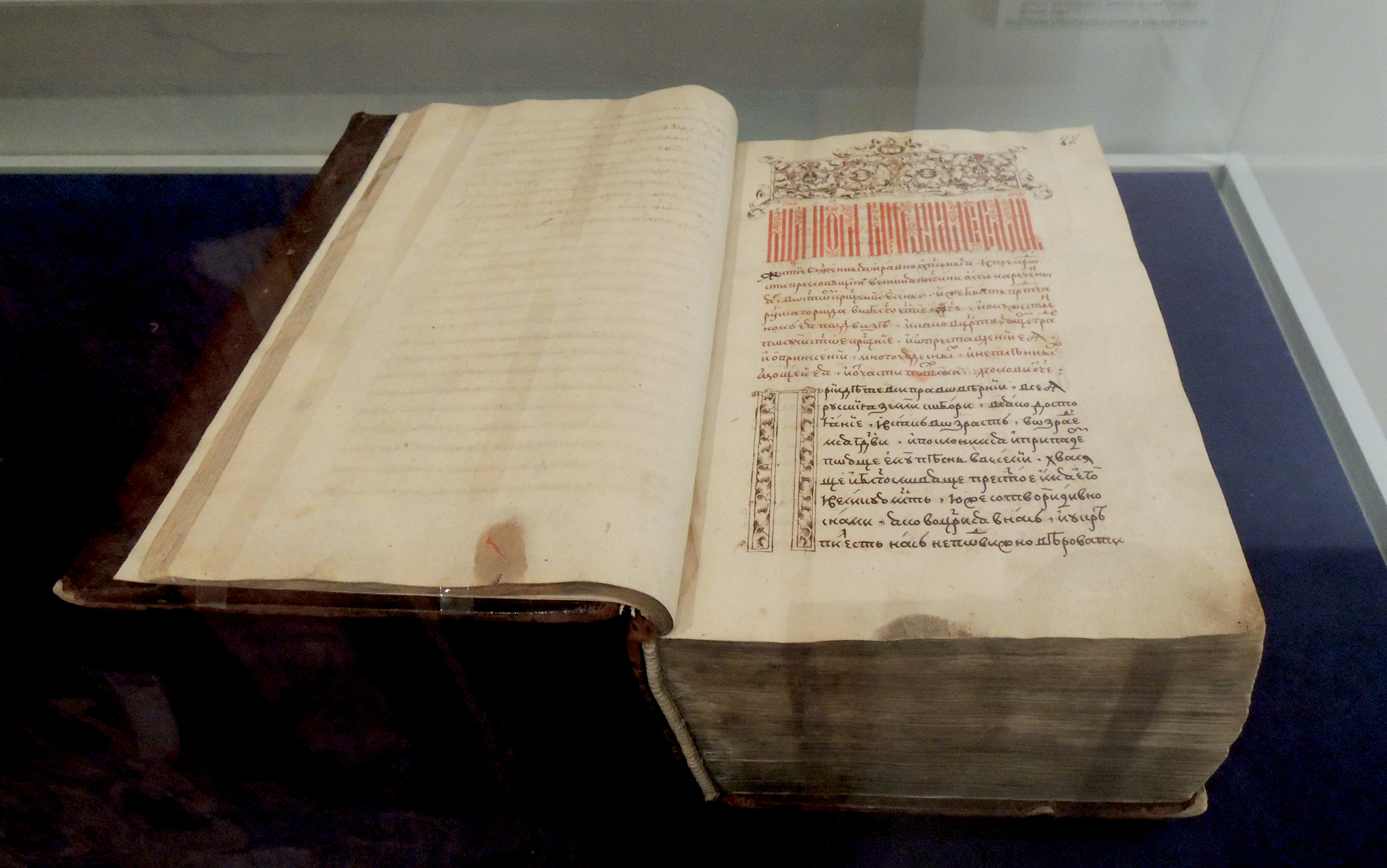
A mid-17th-century manuscript of The Book of Degrees

The Book of Royal Degrees (Russian: Степенная книга, romanized: Stepennaya kniga) was the first official work of historiography produced in the nascent Tsardom of Russia. It was commissioned by Macarius, Metropolitan of Moscow from Ivan the Terrible's personal confessor, Andrew, in 1560. This vast work of codification recast historical data compiled from medieval Russian chronicles so as to suit Ivan's tastes and ambitions in the wake of his coronation as the first Russian tsar.

The book gave shape to the idea of Moscow being the "third Rome" by tracing Ivan's patrilineal descent not only from Rurik, but from the first Roman emperor, Augustus. This fantasy genealogy was borrowed from the earlier Tale of the Princes of Vladimir. The compilation is subdivided into 17 parts, or degrees (hence the title). Each degree corresponds to a generation of Ivan's royal ancestors.

According to Arthur Voice, the book "glorifies to the utmost the historic past and the present of Muscovite Rus, primarily by extolling the rulers as having acted in full accord with the church". The biographies of Kievan, Vladimirian and Muscovite rulers tend to pass over into hagiography. Each monarch is presented as a saint, and his actions are cast as "holy deeds". The political philosophy of the time tends to be obscured by thick layers of hyperbole and rhetoric.

== Sources ==
- Lenhoff, G.; Kleimola, A., eds. (2011). The Book of Royal Degrees and the Genesis of Russian Historical Consciousness. Bloomington; Indiana.
- Lenhoff, Gail (2015). "Rus'-Tatar Princely Marriages in the Horde: The Literary Sources". Russian History. 42 (1, Festschrift for Janet Martin). Brill. doi:10.1163/18763316-04201004. S2CID 211599594.
- Voyce, Arthur (1964). Moscow and the Roots of Russian Culture. University of Oklahoma Press.
