= Macarius, Metropolitan of Moscow =

Metropolitan of Moscow from 1542 to 1563

Macarius
- Metropolitan of Moscow and all Russia
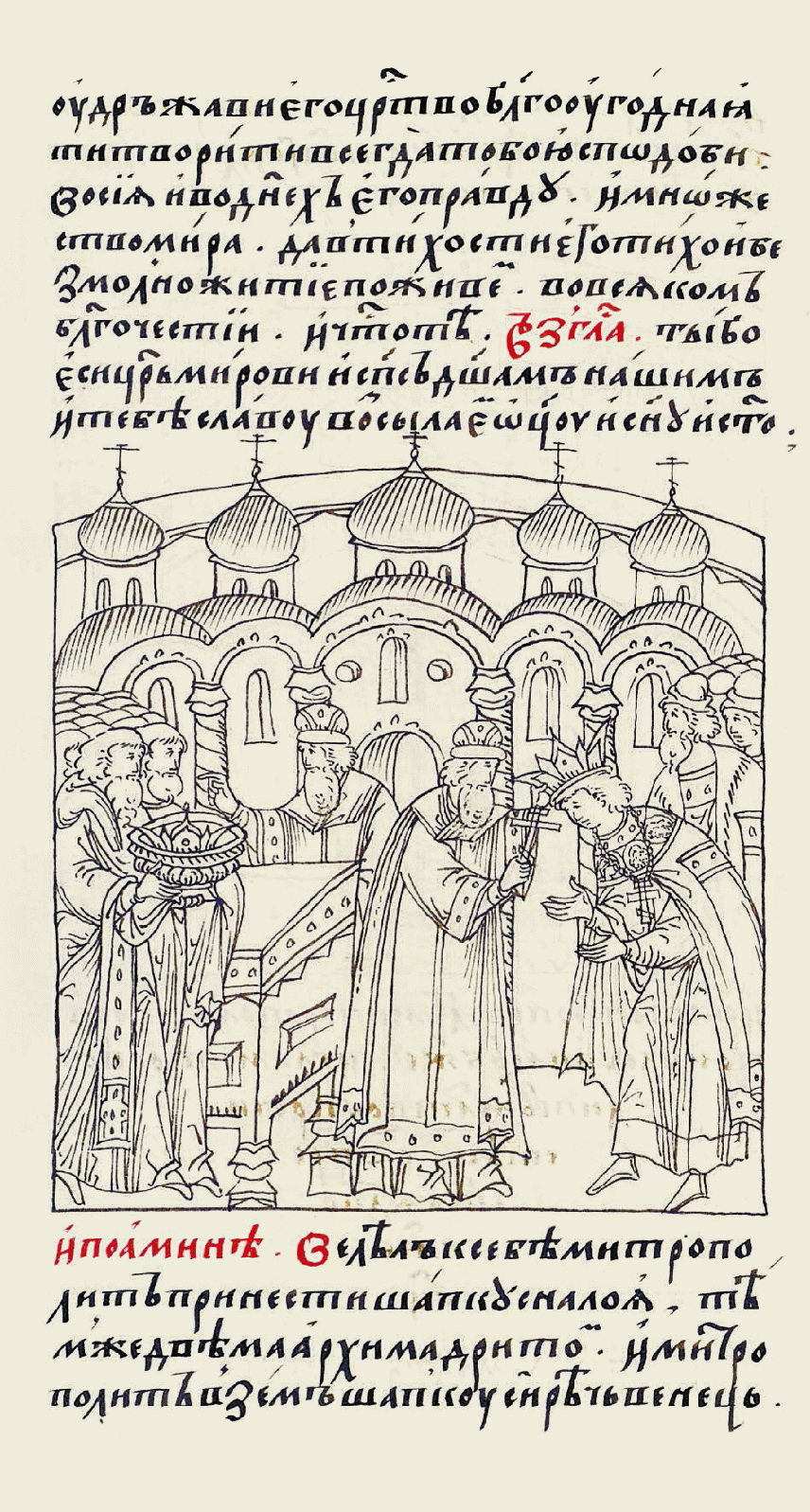
- Metropolitan Macarius blesses Ivan the Terrible during his coronation, miniature from the Illustrated Chronicle of Ivan the Terrible
- Church: Russian Orthodox Church
- See: Moscow
- Installed: 1542
- Term ended: 1563
- Predecessor: Joasaphus
- Successor: Athanasius

Saint Macarius
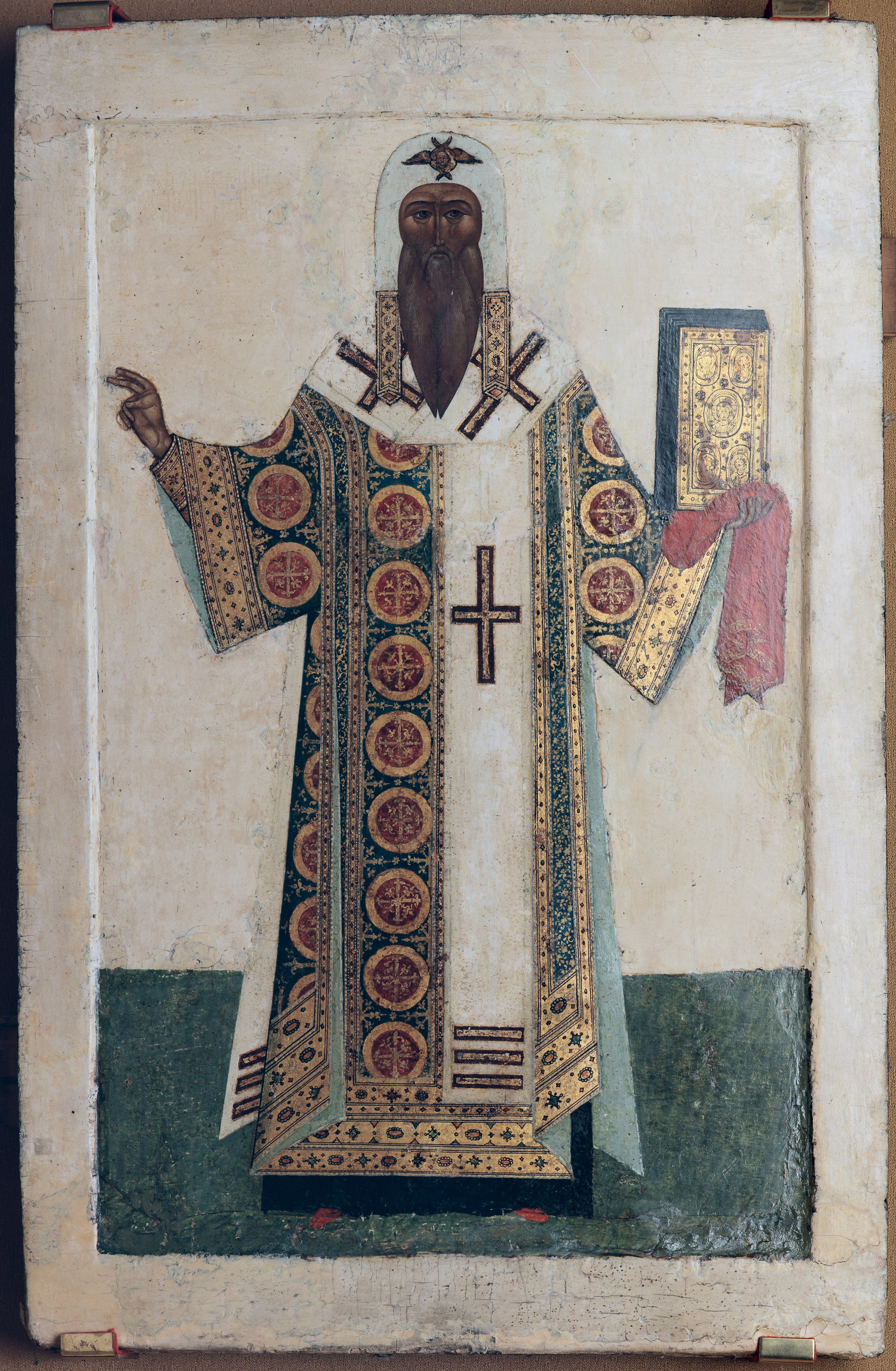
- Modern icon of Saint Macarius of Moscow

Metropolitan of Moscow
- Born: 1482
- Died: 12 January 1563
- Venerated in: Eastern Orthodox Church
- Canonized: 6 June 1988, Trinity Lavra of St. Sergius by 1988 Local Council of the Russian Orthodox Church (Patriarch Pimen I of Moscow)
- Feast: 5 October; 30 December
- Attributes: Vested as a bishop, holding a Gospel Book
- Patronage: Moscow

Macarius (Russian: Мака́рий, romanized: Makary; 1482 – 12 January 1563) was Metropolitan of Moscow and all Rus', the primate of the Russian Orthodox Church, from 1542 to 1563. He was the tenth metropolitan in Moscow to be appointed without the approval of the Ecumenical Patriarch of Constantinople as had been the norm.

== Early life and work on the Menaion ==
Macarius was born in the region around Moscow. His parents' names (at least his mother's monastic names) are known because he dedicates the Great Menaion Reader to them. His secular name is thought to have been Mikhail.

In the late 15th century, Macarius became a monk at the St. Paphnutius Monastery in Borovsk, where he would serve as a reader, subdeacon, deacon, and priest. It was here that Macarius mastered the art of icon painting. He is also known to have been a firm supporter of Joseph Volotsky and his disciples. He was a notable Russian cleric, writer, and icon painter.

In 1523, Metropolitan Daniel raised Macarius to the rank of archmandrite of a monastery in Mozhaisk. It was there that Macarius became acquainted with the Grand Prince of Moscow, Vasili III. He was one of a few clerics who supported Vasili III's divorce from the barren Solomonia Saburova and blessed his second marriage with Elena Glinskaya.

In 1526, Macarius was appointed as the archbishop of Novgorod, where he conducted pro-Muscovite policies. In 1533 and again in 1535, he sent the monk Ilya and others on missionary work among the Finno-Ugric peoples along the Neva, Lakes Ladoga and Onega, and up into the Kola Peninsula. His successor in Novgorod, Feodosii, send missionaries to the same region a decade later.

In 1541, Macarius and his companions finished work on the first edition of their great work, the Great Menaion Reader. This compilation of lives of the Russian saints comprised 12 volumes arranged on monthly basis. He is also credited with beginning the Stepennaya Kniga ("Book of Royal Degrees") which traced Ivan the Terrible's lineage back to a fictitious brother of Caesar Augustus named Prus. He is also said to have painted the icons in the little iconostasis of the Cathedral of Holy Wisdom in Novgorod.

== Metropolitan of Moscow ==
Having secured the support of a powerful prince, Andrey Shuisky, Macarius was elected Metropolitan of Moscow and all Russia on 16 March 1542. During Ivan IV's nonage and Shuiskys' regency, Macarius's relations with the Boyar Duma gradually worsened due to his constant "grief" over the disgrace of courtiers and church dignitaries. His independent-mindedness induced a number of attempts to dislodge him. In the summer of 1544, Macarius escaped a sure death in the fire raging in the Moscow Kremlin. Three years later, he took part in removing Ivan's maternal relatives, the Glinskys, from the Russian government.

Upon becoming one of the closest advisers of Ivan the Terrible, Macarius arranged his coronation on 16 January 1547. That year, he blessed the tsar's marriage with Anastasia Zakharyina-Yuriyeva. Macarius was an active participant at the zemsky sobors of 1547, 1549, and 1550, advocating conciliation between the opposing boyar groups.

During the synod of 1542, Macarius achieved the excommunication of Maximus the Greek's associate Isaac Sobaka, archmandrite of the Chudov Monastery. Macarius would later correspond with the exiled Maximus the Greek and include some of his essays in his the Great Menaion Reader, rejecting, however, his appeals for pardon. During the Stoglav Synod and other such synods, traditionally known as Macarius's synods in Russian historiography, Macarius carried out the canonization of 39 all-Russian saints. In 1551, Macarius, together with the tsar, convened the Stoglav Sobor. He also blessed the Russian army before its departure to Kazan in 1552.

During his Kazan campaign in 1559, Ivan the Terrible left Macarius in Moscow to "protect the tsardom", which made him a temporary head of state. In 1552 and 1554, Macarius completed the second and third editions of the Grand Menaion. During the church councils in 1553–1555, Macarius supported the accusations of heresy, aimed at a boyar son Matvei Bashkin, starets Artemiy, and monk Feodosiy Kosoy. However, he took the side of Sylvester, a monk at the Cathedral of the Annunciation in the Moscow Kremlin, who had been accused by diak Ivan Viskovatyi in uncanonical wall-painting of the above-mentioned cathedral.

When the tsar was away from Moscow, Macarius was in charge of diplomatic negotiations and dispatching messengers abroad with different deeds. The painting of the Saint Basil's Cathedral and the Kremlin's Golden Chamber was carried out with his assistance. He also took part in compiling the Chronicle of the Beginning of Tsardom of Tsar and Grand Prince Ivan Vasiliyevich, i.e., an official chronicle of Ivan the Terrible's reign and the Regal Book, an illuminated manuscript about Ivan's reign and policies.

== Later years ==
In his declining years, Macarius moved away from the affairs of the state. He supervised the creation of the Stepennaya kniga (or the Book of Generations), supported Ivan Fyodorov's book-printing, and renovated icons. Metropolitan Macarius died on 12 January 1563 and was buried in the Cathedral of the Dormition of the Moscow Kremlin. After his death, they wrote his life and A Tale of the Last Days of Metropolitan Macarius. Macarius was canonized by the Russian Orthodox Church in 1988 (he, however, is found in lists of saints dating back to the 18th century). His icon hangs in a niche over the archway of the entrance to the Russian State Archive of Ancient Documents in Moscow.

== Sources ==
- "Макарий, митрополит Всероссийский" . Brockhaus and Efron Encyclopedic Dictionary (in Russian). 1906.

Preceded by Joasaphus	Metropolitan of Moscow and all Rus'	Succeeded by Athanasius
Preceded by Serapion	Archbishop of Novgorod	Succeeded by Theodosius
