= Fire of Moscow (1547) =

16th-century fire in Moscow

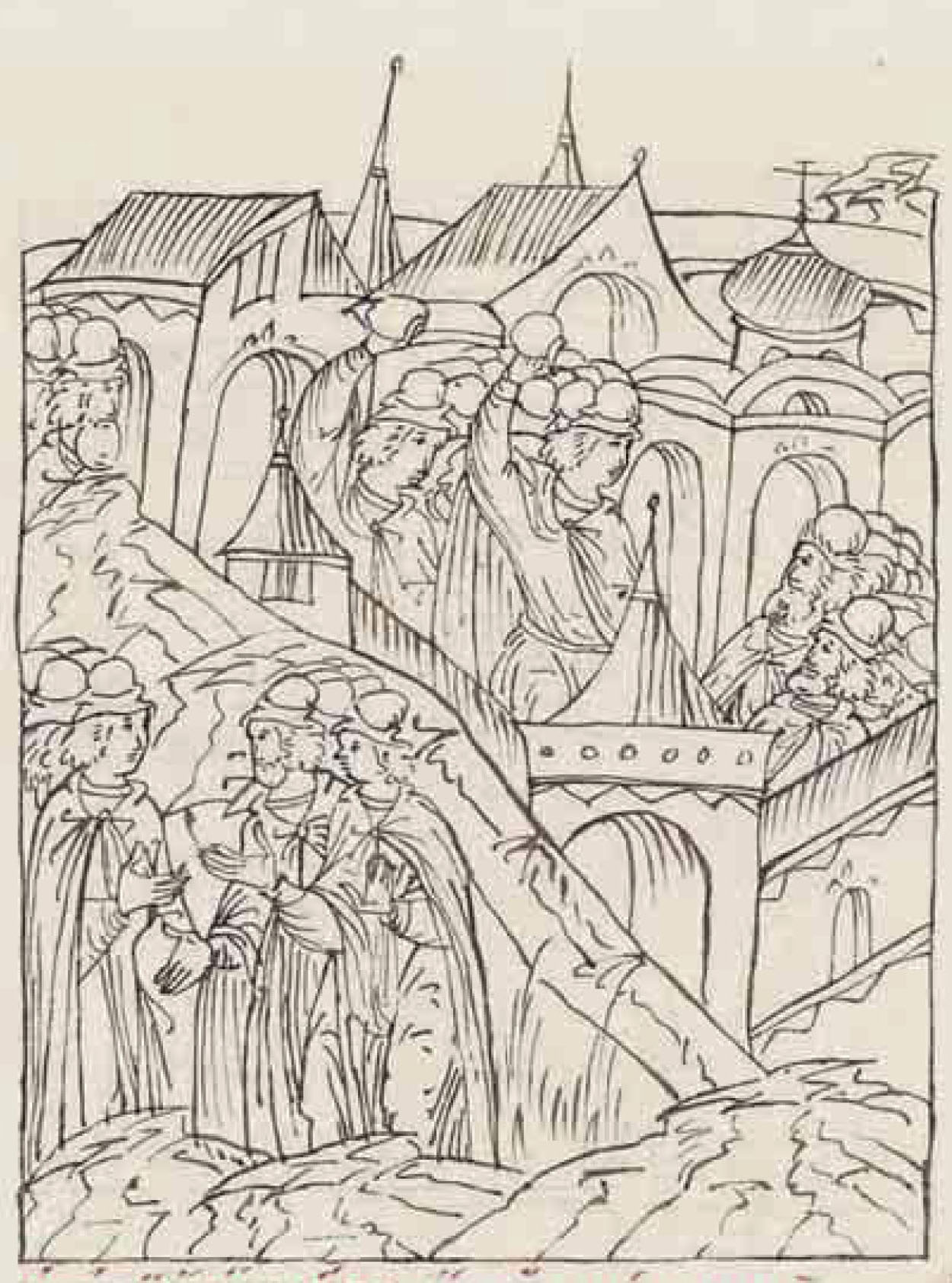
A painting by an unknown painter depicts the uprising in Russia following the 1547 fire of Moscow

The great fire of Moscow in 1547 destroyed sections of Moscow that had been built almost entirely of wood. The fire swept into the Kremlin and blew up the powder stores in several of the Kremlin's towers. The fire began on 24 June, several months after Ivan IV, better known as "Ivan the Terrible," was officially crowned as first tsar of all Russia.

The fire displaced about 80,000 people and killed about 2,700 to 3,700 people (not including children), and led to widespread poverty among the survivors. Metropolitan Macarius was apparently injured in the fire when the Cathedral of the Dormition in the Kremlin was threatened by the flames and the metropolitan was taken out through a breach in the Kremlin walls and let down by rope into the Moscow River. He may have never fully recovered from his injuries, although he lived another 16 years.

The Muscovites put the blame on the tsar's maternal relatives from the Glinski family. A rebellion began and Yuri Glinski was stoned to death inside the Cathedral of the Dormition in front of a horrified Metropolitan Macarius. Yuri's brother, Mikhail Glinski attempted to flee to Lithuania but failed, and his mother, Anna Glinskaya, the tsar's grandmother, was accused of using sorcery to start the fire. The rebellion resulted in the fall of the Glinski party and eventually strengthened the positions of the young tsar, although he did not hand his grandmother over to the mob as they demanded.
