= Aleksey Adashev =

Russian statesman and political prisoner (died 1561)

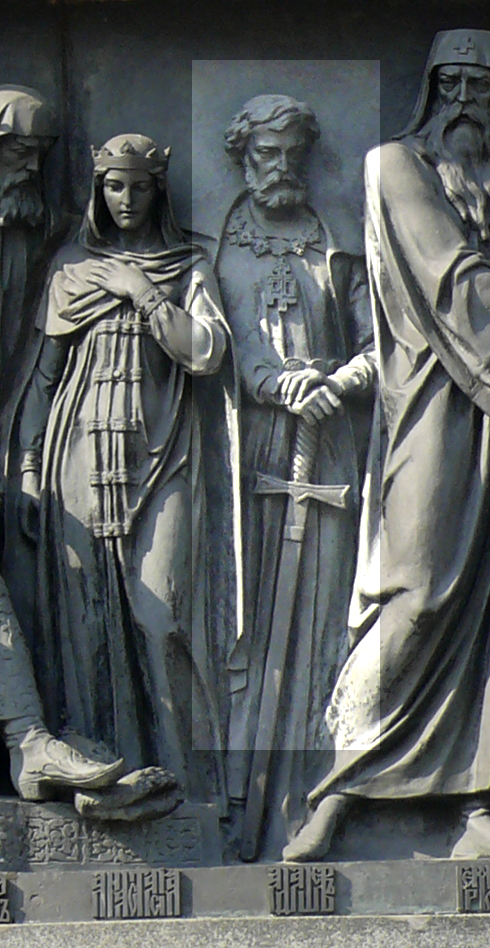
Adashev on the monument Millennium of Russia

Aleksey Fyodorovich Adashev (Russian: Адашев, Алексей Фёдорович, died 1561) was a Russian statesman, okolnichy, postelnichy, voivode of Livonia. He was a confidant of Tsar Ivan the Terrible, but fell out of favor and was imprisoned in Yuryev (now Tartu) in 1560, where he died.
