= History of the Russian Orthodox Church =

The history of the Russian Orthodox Church begins with the Christianization of Kievan Rus' in 988 during the reign of Vladimir the Great. In the following centuries, Kiev and later other cities, including Novgorod, Pskov, Rostov, Suzdal and Vladimir, became important regional centers of Christian spirituality and culture. Following the 13th-century Mongol invasions, the metropolitan relocated from Kiev to Vladimir in 1299, then to Moscow in 1325, from then on the center of the Russian Orthodox Church.

The metropolitans of the Russian Church supported the rise of the Moscow principality and his presence increased the Muscovite prince's authority and ambition to unify the lands. In turn, the metropolitans were able to increase the stability of the Church and to inspire unity among the divided Russian principalities. By the mid-15th century, Moscow was both the political and religious center of the country. The Russian Church declared autocephaly in 1448, shortly before the fall of Constantinople, owing to its protest over the Council of Florence. At the behest of the grand prince of Moscow, a council of Russian bishops elected a local bishop without the approval of Constantinople.

After Constantinople fell in 1453, Moscow became the only independent Orthodox power and its leaders soon began to advance the claim that Moscow was the successor to the Byzantine Empire. In 1589, the metropolitan was elevated to a patriarch and the independence of the Russian Church was recognized by Constantinople for the first time. In the mid-17th century, a schism in the Church led to the rise of the Old Believer movement. The church reform of Peter the Great occurred in the early 18th century, beginning the Synodal period of the history of the Russian Church that would last until the Russian Revolution of 1917.

The early Bolsheviks repressed the Church, but Joseph Stalin revived the Church in 1941 when faced with the German invasion. For the remainder of the Soviet Union's existence, the Russian Orthodox Church hierarchy and the Communist Party would collaborate and share power, while dissent was repressed. After the dissolution of the Soviet Union, the Church managed to regain much authority in Russian society during the presidency of Vladimir Putin. In 2018, a new schism with Constantinople began following the latter's recognition of the Orthodox Church of Ukraine.

== Periodization ==
The history of the Russian Orthodox Church does not follow the typical periodization of Christianity found in Western Europe, which consists of the Middle Ages, the Renaissance, the Reformation and the Enlightenment. Historians have instead organized Russia's history around the political centers to which Christianity has been closely tied. As a result, there is no definitive consensus among scholars on the periodization of the history of the Russian Church, but six periods are usually identified: 988–1448; 1448–1589; 1589–1700; 1700–1917; 1917–1988; and 1988–present.

== Early history ==
One of the foundational narratives associated with the history of Orthodoxy in Russia is found in the 12th-century Primary Chronicle, which says that the Apostle Andrew visited Scythia and Greek colonies along the northern coast of the Black Sea before making his way to Chersonesus in Crimea. According to the legend, Andrew reached the future location of Kiev and foretold the foundation of a great Christian city with many churches. Then, "he came to the [land of the] Slovenians where Novgorod now [stands]" and observed the locals, before eventually arriving in Rome. Despite the lack of historical evidence supporting this narrative, modern church historians in Russia have often incorporated this tale into their studies.

In the 10th century, Christianity began to take root in Kievan Rus'. Although Oleg was hostile towards the Church, a series of treaties between the Rus' and the Byzantine Empire resulted in a more favorable view. The first church in Kiev was built in the early 10th century and dedicated to the prophet Elijah. Towards the end of the reign of Igor, Christians are mentioned among the Varangians. In the text about the treaty with the Byzantine Empire in 944–945, the chronicler also records the oath-taking ceremony that took place in Constantinople for Igor's envoys as well as the equivalent ceremony that took place in Kiev.

Igor's wife Olga was baptized sometime in the mid-10th century; however, scholars have disputed the exact year and place of her conversion, with dates ranging from 946 to 960. Most scholars tend to agree that she was baptized in Constantinople, though some argue that her conversion took place in Kiev. Olga's son Sviatoslav opposed conversion, despite persuasion from his mother. There is also little information about Christianity in sources in the period between 969 and 988. A number of missionaries arrived, such as during the reign of Yaropolk I, but their mission turned out to be unsuccessful.

== Under the Byzantine patriarch, 988–1448 ==
=== Christianization ===
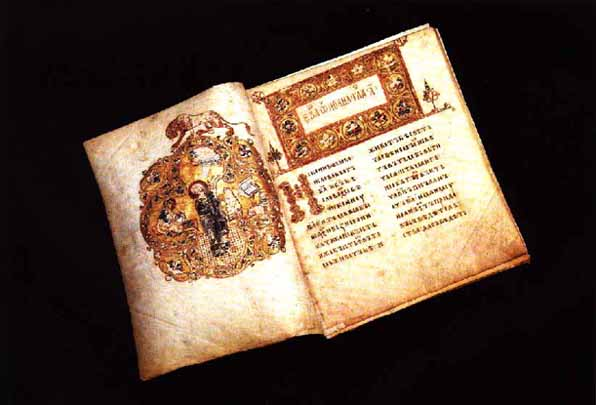
Ostromir Gospels from Novgorod (1057)

Vladimir seized power in 978 and he was later baptized in 988. Following this, mass baptisms took place. The year 988 was decreed by the Russian Orthodox Church in 1988 as the date of the Christianization of the country. According to the Primary Chronicle, Vladimir had previously sent envoys to investigate the different faiths. It says that Judaism was rejected because the Jews had lost their sovereign territory, while Islam was rejected due to its prohibition of alcohol and other customs that were unpopular. In particular, the eastern church was favored due to its rituals surpassing those of the Roman church.

After receiving glowing reports about Constantinople, Vladimir captured Chersonesus in Crimea and demanded that the sister of Basil II be sent there. The marriage took place on the condition that Vladimir would be also baptized there. Vladimir had lent considerable military support to the Byzantine emperor and may have besieged the city due to it having sided with the rebellious Bardas Phokas. Vladimir was later canonized as a saint with the title "equal to the Apostles", in commemoration of the Christianization of his country. According to Hilarion Alfeyev, "the choice of the 'Greek faith' would translate for the Russian people into a choice of civilization".

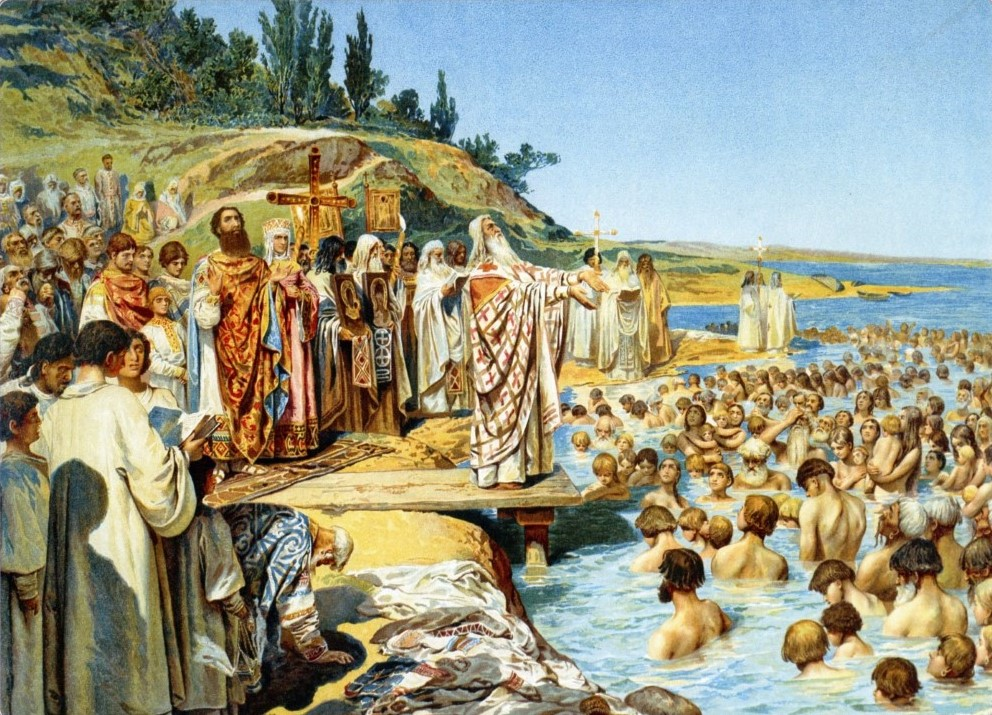
The Baptism of Kievans, painting by Klavdy Lebedev

Under Vladimir, the metropolis of Kiev was established and it remained under the jurisdiction of the patriarch of Constantinople until 1589. The first metropolitan was Michael, who, according to tradition, was brought by Vladimir from Chersonesus. He was of Bulgar or Assyrian origin. Michael is said to have founded Kiev's first religious house, St. Michael's Golden-Domed Monastery. Its golden domes were among the first in Kievan Rus'. Following the death of Vladimir in 1015, a succession struggle led to conflict between his sons. Boris and Gleb were murdered for resisting Sviatopolk I after he assumed the throne. The two brothers became the first saints of the country after being canonized in 1071.

Hilarion was the first non-Greek metropolitan after he succeeded Theopemptus in 1049. Luka Zhidiata, the second bishop of Novgorod, refused to accept the validity of this as Hilarion was chosen by Grand Prince Yaroslav without the agreement of Constantinople. As a result, Luka was imprisoned until his death. Hilarion has long been revered for his writings, such as the Sermon on Law and Grace. By the early 11th century, Christianity was well-established as the religion of Kievan Rus'. By the early 13th century, some 40 episcopal sees had been established, all of which ultimately answered to Constantinople. After the Mongol invasions, which led to the destruction of Kiev in 1240, religious authority shifted north, to the city of Vladimir. The Vladimir grand principality emerged as the dominant political force, while the city-state of Novgorod in northwest Russia maintained some degree of political and religious autonomy.

=== Rise of Moscow ===
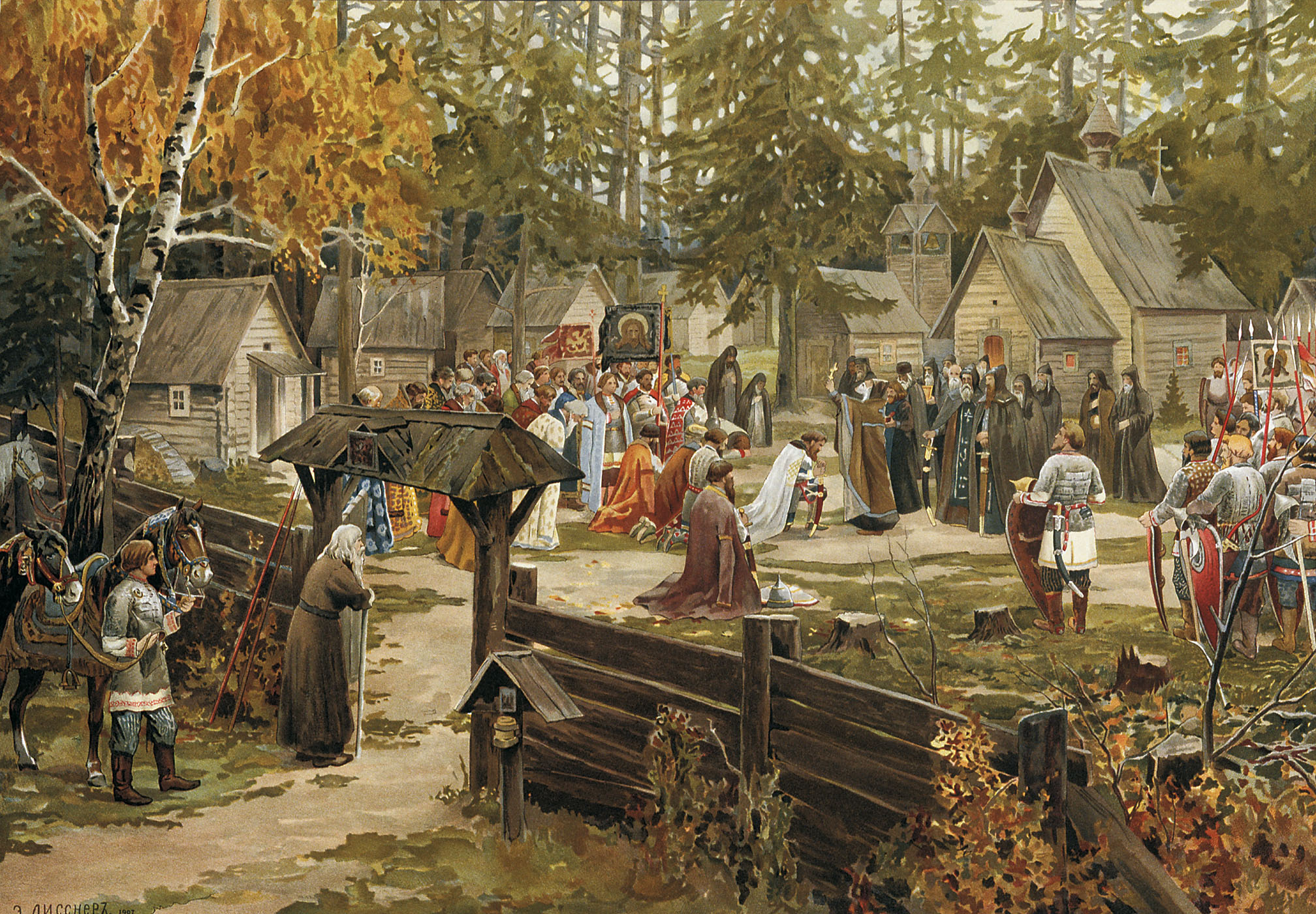
Sergius of Radonezh blessing Dmitry Donskoy in Trinity Sergius Lavra before the Battle of Kulikovo, painting by Ernst Lissner

The Novgorodian prince Alexander Nevsky, later canonized as a saint, submitted to the Mongols while also stopping the eastward advance of the Teutonic Knights. He became the grand prince of Vladimir and delivered the tribute to the khan in Sarai. The appanage principality of Moscow, which was originally established for Alexander's youngest son Daniel, became one of the leading principalities and it began a steady rise to dominance. After Kiev lost its significance following the Mongol invasions, Metropolitan Maximus moved his seat to Vladimir in 1299, "being unable to tolerate Tatar violence", according to a later chronicle.

His successor, Peter, found himself caught in the conflict between the principalities of Tver and Moscow for supremacy in northwest Russia. Peter allied himself with the prince of Moscow and began looking for a new residence, where he singled out Moscow despite the fact it was "small and had a small population", according to his biographer Cyprian. He wrote that the city of Moscow "was ruled by the pious Grand-prince Ivan, son of Daniel, grandson of the blessed Alexander [Nevsky], whom the blessed Peter saw resplending in Orthodoxy, merciful to the poor, honouring the holy churches of God and the clergy, loving divine Scriptures, well instructed in the teachings of the books. So the holy hierarch of God [Peter] loved him very much". Peter moved his residence to Moscow in 1325 and became a strong ally of the prince of Moscow. During Peter's tenure in Moscow, the foundation for the Dormition Cathedral was laid and Peter was buried there. By choosing to reside and be buried in Moscow, Peter had designated Moscow as the future center of the Russian Orthodox Church.

Peter was succeeded by Theognostus, who, like his predecessor, pursued policies that supported the rise of the Moscow principality. During the first four years of his tenure, the Dormition Cathedral was completed and an additional four stone churches were constructed in Moscow. By the end of 1331, Theognostus was able to restore ecclesiastical control over Lithuania. Theognostus also proceeded with the canonization of Peter in 1339, and requested an official document from Patriarch John Calecas to recommend the start of liturgical veneration, which helped to increase Moscow's prestige. According to John Meyendorff, most Byzantine diplomats and ecclesiastics were distrustful of Lithuania and believed that Moscow's policy of appeasing the Mongols better matched Byzantine interests. His successor Alexius lost ecclesiastical over Lithuania in 1355, but kept the traditional title.

Alexius, who was given the title Wonderworker of All Russia, was the most significant of early Russian prelates. He originally joined the Epiphany Monastery in Moscow, where the monks Gerontius and Stephen became his guides, and he eventually came to the attention of Metropolitan Theognostus. Like Alexander Nevsky, he visited the khan's court in Sarai, and according to legend, he cured the blindness of Taydula Khatun, a consort of the khan. He also founded several monasteries, notably the Andronikov Monastery and the Chudov Monastery. Another significant religious figure was Sergius of Radonezh, who exerted the greatest influence of any personage on the Russian Church. He founded the Trinity Lavra of St. Sergius, what is now the most venerated monastic house in Russia. Sergius is also said to have bestowed upon Grand Prince Dmitry the victory against the Mongols in the 1380 Battle of Kulikovo with the help of the monks Alexander Peresvet and Rodion Oslyabya.

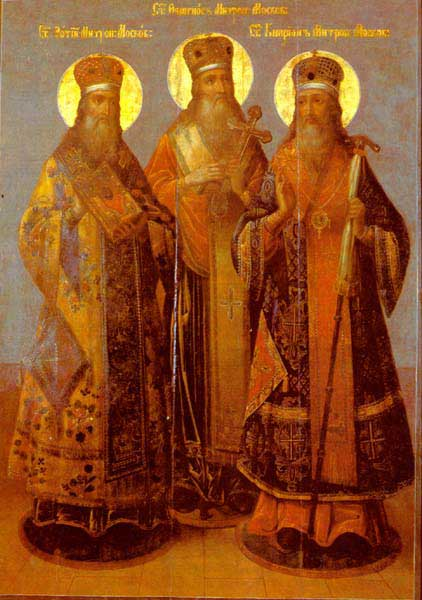
Metropolitans Photius, Theognostus and Cyprian

Theophanes the Greek was the first of a triumvirate of Russian icon painters in Moscow. His student, Andrei Rublev, enabled spirituality within Russian Orthodoxy through distinctive iconography and he is considered to be one of the greatest icon painters. His most notable work is The Trinity. His work fused Byzantine and Russian artistic traditions, which were influenced by his collaboration with Theophanes. In 1405, he decorated the Cathedral of the Annunciation in Moscow and three years later, he moved to Vladimir to produce masterpieces for the Dormition Cathedral. He later worked at the Trinity Monastery's Trinity Cathedral before retiring to the Andronikov Monastery. Dionisius was the third renowned icon painter and among his earliest great works are icons at the Dormition Cathedral in Moscow.

As the Ottoman Empire captured more Byzantine territory, an ecumenical council took place at Ferrara in April 1438 which sought to heal the Great Schism. The Byzantine emperor, John VIII Palaeologus, attended the council and presided over representatives of the Eastern Orthodox Church. Among them was Metropolitan Isidore. The primary agenda was agreeing on a common theology, but discussions fell apart on the issue of purgatory. The council was then transferred to Florence, and in February 1439, the primary issue of the filioque was being considered. Discussions continued into the summer and the other 33 Greek ecclesiastics finally accepted the union after the embattled Byzantines were offered military aid by the Catholic powers.

On 5 July 1439, at the Council of Florence, the only Russian prelate present at the council signed the union, which, according to his companion, was only under duress as Metropolitan Isidore had threatened to arrest to him. In the Tale of the Council of Florence, it says that the prelate "did not wish [to sign], but Metropolitan Isidor arrested him and gaoled him for a whole week. Then he signed under constraint." Isidore was made cardinal and Apostolic Delegate "in the Province of Lithuania, Livonia and Russia and in the states, dioceses, territories and places of Lechia [Poland] which are regarded as subject to you in your right as metropolitan".

Metropolitan Isidore left Florence on 6 September 1439 and returned to Moscow on 19 March 1441. The grand prince of Moscow was given a letter from the pope stating "the Eastern Church is now one with us" and giving much of the credit to "our most holy brother Isidor, your metropolitan... of all Russia and legate from the Apostolic Throne... We ask you in piety to receive this Metropolitan Isidor for his justice and for the good of the Church...". The chronicles say that three days after arriving in Moscow, Grand Prince Vasily II arrested Isidore and placed him under supervision in the Chudov Monastery. According to the chroniclers of the grand prince, "the princes, the boyars and many others — and especially the Russian bishops — remained silent, slumbered and fell asleep" until "the divinely wise, Christ-loving sovereign, Grand Prince Vasily Vasilyevich shamed Isidor and called him not his pastor and teacher, but a wicked and baneful wolf".

Despite the chronicles calling him a heretical apostate, Isidore was recognized as the lawful metropolitan by Vasily II until he left Moscow on 15 September 1441. The grand princely codex of 1479 describes Isidore's "secret escape by night like a thief" and mentions that "Grand Prince Vasily Vasil'evich sent no one to bring him back, nor did he have any desire to hold him back". Vasily II wrote a letter to Patriarch Metrophanes II, which was never sent, requesting for a Russian candidate to be appointed as metropolitan.

For the following seven years, the seat of the metropolitan remained vacant. Vasily II defeated the rebellious Dmitry Shemyaka and returned to Moscow in February 1447. On 15 December 1448, a council of Russian bishops elected Jonah as metropolitan, without the consent of the patriarch of Constantinople, which marked the beginning of autocephaly of the Russian Church. Although not all Russian clergy supported Jonah, the move was subsequently justified in the Russian point of view following the fall of Constantinople in 1453, which was interpreted as divine punishment. While it is possible that the failure to obtain the blessing from Constantinople was not intentional, nevertheless, this marked the beginning of independence of the Russian Church.

== Autocephaly, 1448–1589 ==
Jonah's policy as metropolitan was to recover the areas lost to the Uniate church. He was able to include Lithuania and Kiev to his title, but not Galicia. Lithuania was separated from his jurisdiction in 1458, and the influence of Catholicism increased in those regions. As soon as Vasily II heard about the ordination of Gregory as metropolitan of the newly established metropolis of Kiev, he sent a delegation to the king of Poland warning him not to accept Gregory; Jonah also attempted to persuade feudal princes and nobles who resided in Lithuania to continue to side with Orthodoxy, but this attempt failed.

The fall of Constantinople and the beginning of autocephaly of the Russian Church contributed to political consolidation in Russia and the development of a new identity based on awareness that Moscow was only metropolitanate in the Orthodox oikoumene that remained politically independent. The formulation of the idea of Moscow as the "third Rome" is primarily associated with the monk Philotheus of Pskov, who stated that "Moscow alone shines over all the earth more radiantly than the sun" because of its fidelity to the faith. The marriage of Ivan III to Sophia Palaiologina, the niece of the last Byzantine emperor, and the defeat of the Tatars, helped to solidify this view.

In the late 15th century, a new movement known in sources as the Judaizers emerged in Russia. A Jewish visitor to Novgorod in 1470 is said to have laid the groundwork for its propagation. Ivan III visited the city in 1483 after imposing his direct rule on Novgorod and made his acquaintance with two local priests who had converted. In turn, Ivan's foreign secretary, Fyodor Kuritsyn, and the consort of his son, Elena of Moldavia, became acquainted with the movement. Joseph of Volotsk offered a strong defense of the Church as he perceived the heresy to be a grave threat. This movement was said to be "Judaizing" because it dismissed the doctrines of the Trinity and salvation through Christ's crucifixion and resurrection, among other principles, while incorporating aspects of traditional Jewish beliefs, worship and practices. A sobor (council) was convoked in the presence of Ivan and his heir Vasily III, in which various forms of heresy, including that of the Judaizers, were condemned and made capital crimes. As a result, Dmitry Ivanovich, son of Ivan's deceased eldest son, and his mother Elena were imprisoned, while other officials who had supported the movement were burned at the stake.

By the turn of the 16th century, the consolidation of Orthodoxy in Russia continued as Archbishop Gennady of Novgorod created the first complete manuscript translation of the Bible into Church Slavonic in 1499, known as Gennady's Bible. At the same time, two movements within the Russian Church had emerged with differing ecclesial visions. Nilus of Sora (1433–1508) led the non-possessors, who opposed monastic landholding except for the purposes of charity in addition to strong involvement of the church in state affairs, while Joseph of Volotsk (1439–1515) led a movement that supported strong church involvement in the state's affairs and monastic landholding. Ivan III had intended to increase the dependence of the Church upon the state, not only in terms of its finances but also in its political and religious aspects. Joseph based his opposition not only on the need to resist the encroachment of the Russian tsar, but also to allow his monastery to continue its charity work. By 1551, the Stoglav Synod addressed the lack of uniformity in existing ecclesial practices. Metropolitan Macarius also collected "all holy books... available in the Russian land" and completed the Grand Menaion, which was influential in shaping the narrative tradition of Russian Orthodoxy.

Ivan IV initiated a sobor in 1553–1554, presided by Metropolitan Macarius, which condemned the Judaizing heresy once and for all, and found dissident clerics guilty. Metropolitan Athanasius succeeded Macarius in 1564 and only held the position for two years before retiring to the Chudov Monastery. Herman of Kazan succeeded him, but he only lasted two days before his opposition led to his banishment. He was then succeeded by Philip II, who bore the brunt of the tsar's rage. Philip, who had been an abbot of the Solovetsky Monastery, played a major role in church and state politics. When Philip refused a benediction to the oprichniki, the tsar's ruthless enforcers, Philip was exiled to the Otroch Monastery in Tver and in December 1569, he was strangled to death by the oprichnik Malyuta Skuratov. Philip was not the only prominent ecclesiastic to have been executed, as when Ivan visited the Pskov-Caves Monastery, he personally killed the abbot during a fit of rage.

In 1589, during the reign of Feodor I and under the direction of Boris Godunov, the metropolitan of Moscow, Job, was consecrated as the first Russian patriarch with the blessing of Jeremias II of Constantinople. In the decree establishing the patriarchate, the whole Russian tsardom is called a "third Rome". As a result, the patriarchate was equal in status to that of Constantinople, Antioch, Jerusalem and Alexandria. As Feodor was poorly suited to ruling, the diplomacy was left to the regent Boris Godunov. The residence of the patriarch was established in the Moscow Kremlin, in a building adjacent to the Church of the Twelve Apostles with Byzantine features. In 1590, a council held in Constantinople confirmed the new status of Moscow, and three years later, the four other Orthodox patriarchs ratified this at another council with the support of 42 bishops. Moscow differed in that it was the only independent Orthodox power and this led to the culmination of the idea that Moscow was the "third Rome".

== First patriarchate, 1589–1700 ==
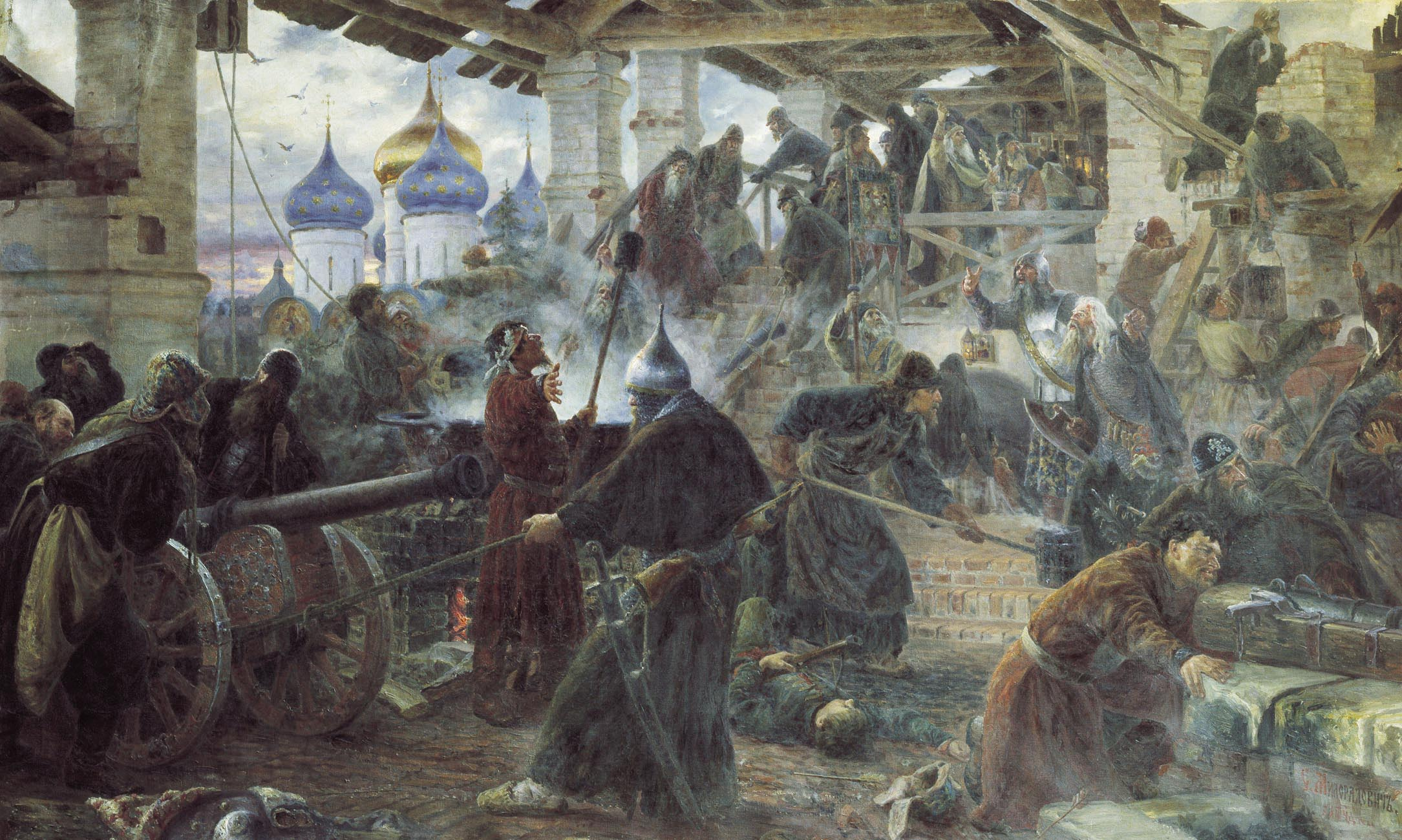
Russian Orthodox monks defend the Trinity Monastery against Polish troops during the Time of Troubles, painting by Sergey Miloradovich

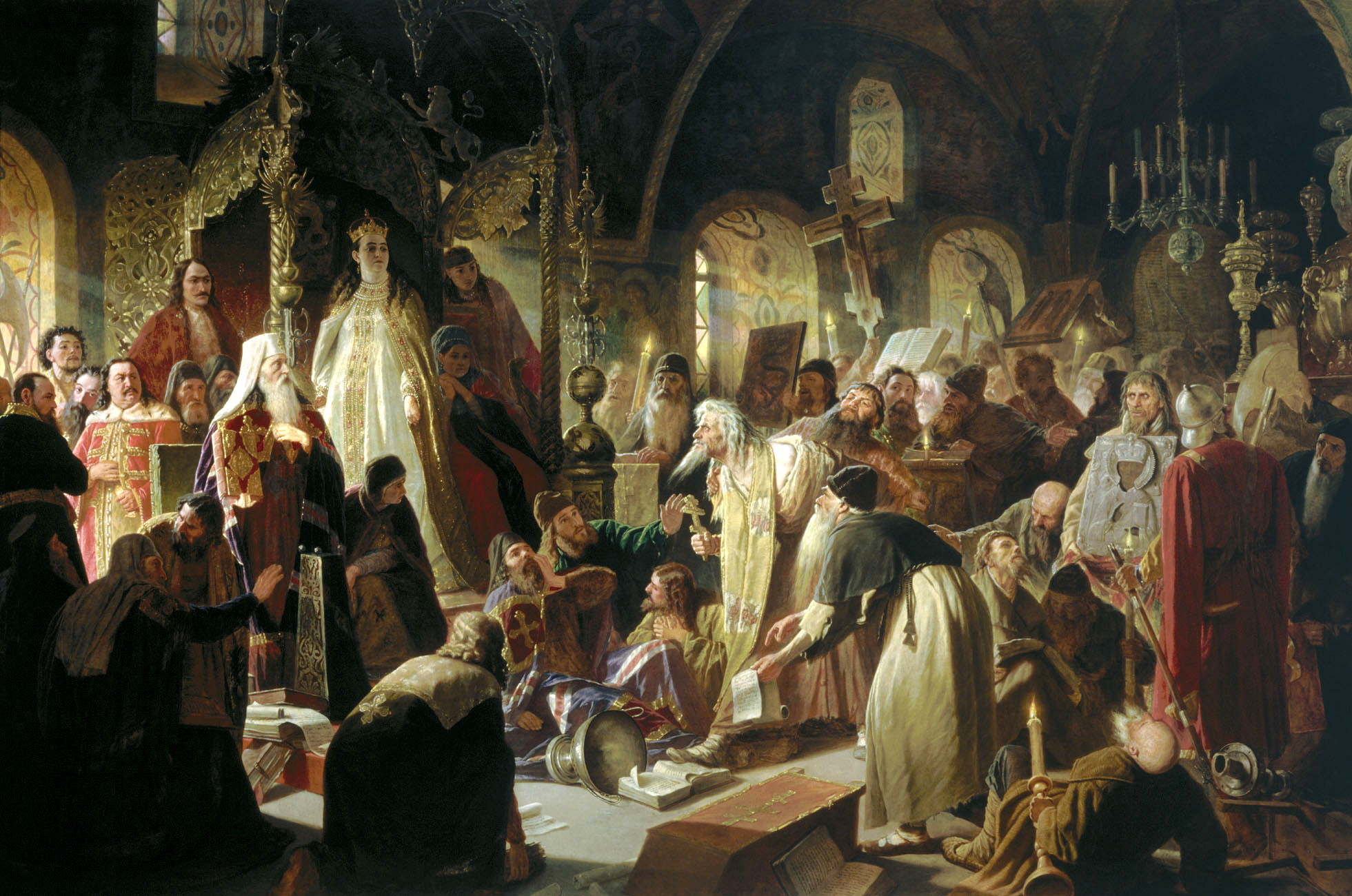
An Old Believer Priest, Nikita Pustosviat, Disputing with Patriarch Joachim the Matters of Faith. Painting by Vasily Perov

By the mid-17th century, the religious practices of the Russian Orthodox Church were distinct from those of the Greek Orthodox Church. Patriarch Nikon reformed the church in order to bring most of its practices back into accommodation with the contemporary forms of Greek Orthodox worship. Nikon's efforts to correct the translations of texts and institute liturgical reforms were not accepted by all. Archpriest Avvakum accused the patriarch of "defiling the faith" and "pouring wrathful fury upon the Russian land". The result was a schism, with those who resisted the new practices being known as the Old Believers.

In the late 17th and the next two centuries, during the expansion of the boundaries of the Russian state, the extent of the territorial authority of the Russian Orthodox Church enlarged with it.

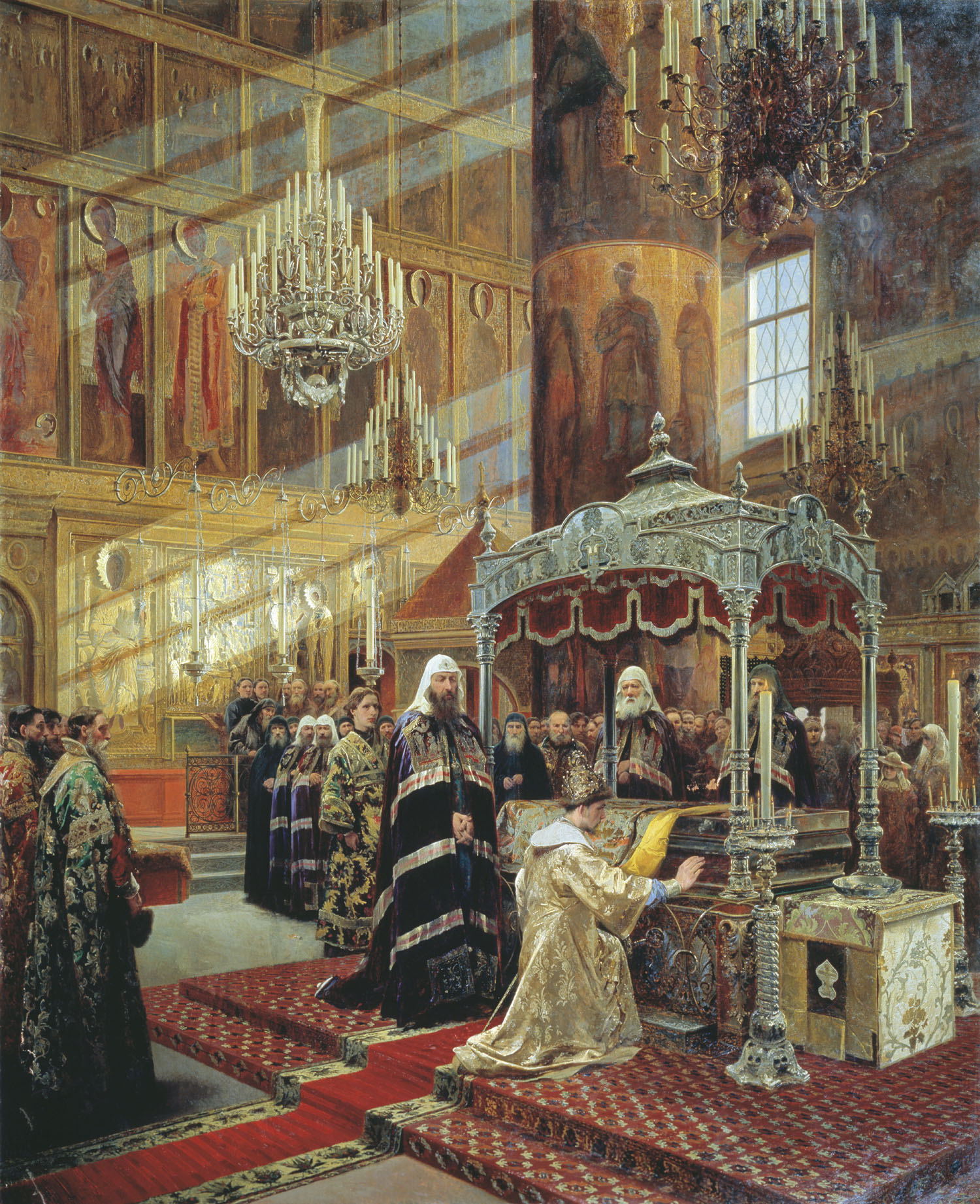
Tsar Alexis praying before the relics of Metropolitan Philip

In 1686, the Moscow Patriarchate obtained a part of the Metropolis of Kiev, which until then comprised the majority of the Orthodox population living in the Polish–Lithuanian Commonwealth, — from the Patriarchate of Constantinople, although the exact terms and conditions of the handover is a contested issue. In November 1685, Gedeon Chetvertinsky was installed as the Metropolitan of Kiev, Galicia and all Rus' by Patriarch Joachim of Moscow; this act was recognized by Patriarch Dionysius IV of Constantinople the following year. His title, privileges, and status were subsequently greatly reduced.

== Synodal period, 1700–1917 ==
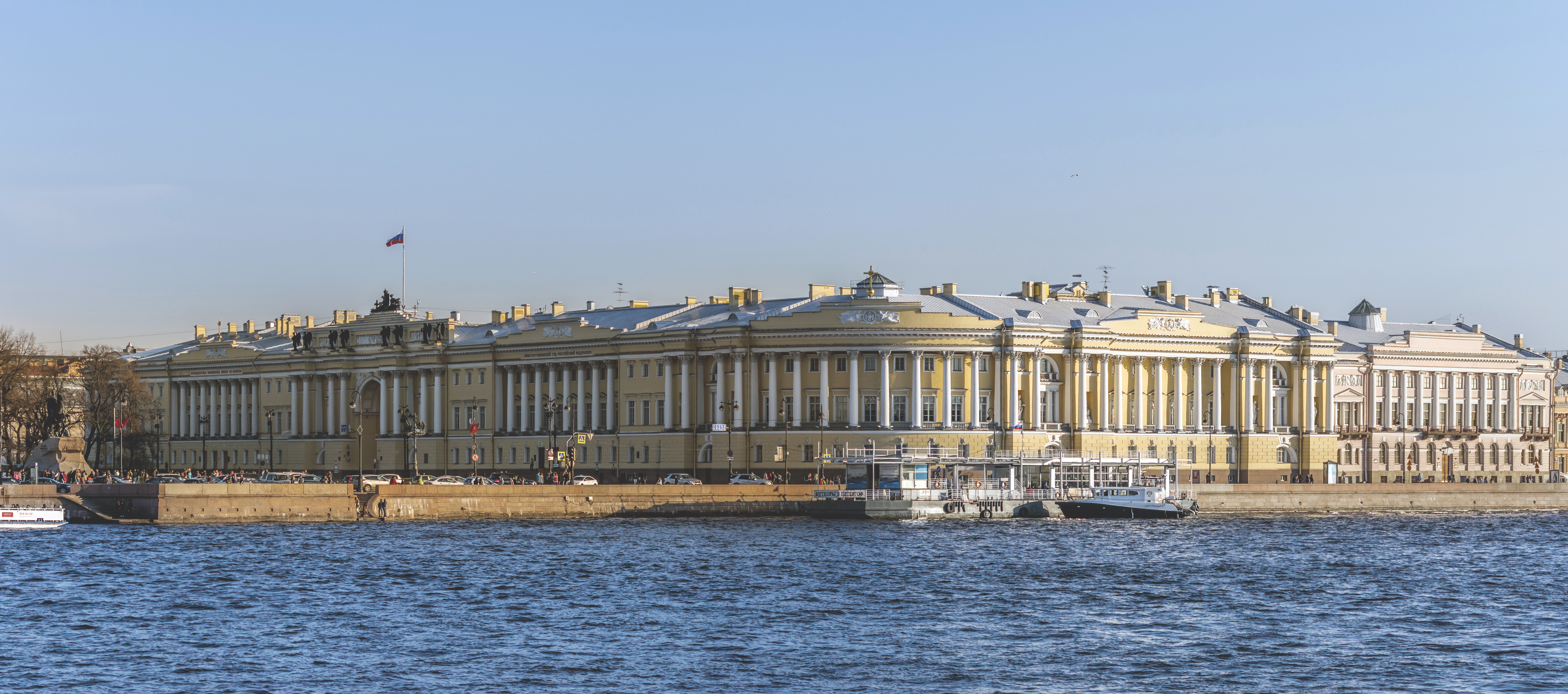
Headquarters of the Holy Synod of the Russian Empire in St. Petersburg

Following the death of Patriarch Adrian in 1700, Peter I of Russia (r. 1682–1725) decided against an election of a new patriarch, and drawing on the clergy that came from Ukraine, he appointed Stefan Yavorsky as locum tenens. Peter believed that Russia's resources, including the church, could be used to establish a modern European state and he sought to strengthen the authority of the monarch. He was also inspired by church–state relations in the West and therefore brought the institutional structure of the church in line with other ministries. Theophan Prokopovich wrote Peter's Spiritual Regulation, which no longer legally recognized the separation of the church and the state.

Peter replaced the patriarch with a council known as the Most Holy Synod in 1721, which consisted of appointed bishops, monks, and priests. The church was also overseen by an ober-procurator that would directly report to the emperor. Peter's reforms marked the beginning of the Synodal period of the Russian Church, which would last until 1917. In order to make monasticism more socially useful, Peter began the processes that would eventually lead to the large-scale secularization of monastic landholdings in 1764 under Catherine II. 822 monasteries were closed between 1701 and 1805, and monastic communities became highly regulated, receiving funds from the state for support.

In 1762, Peter III made an attempt to secularize all church land and serfs. Catherine the Great, who initially reversed Peter's decree, eventually re-affirmed it in 1764 and went still further by closing 569 out of 954 monasteries. In 1785 the Orthodox clergy did not receive a single seat in Catherine's legislative commission. By 1786, Catherine chose to simply exclude all religion and clerical studies programs from lay education. In 1797 the Holy Synod banned the election of priests who were now appointed by bishops.

=== Fin-de-siècle religious renaissance ===
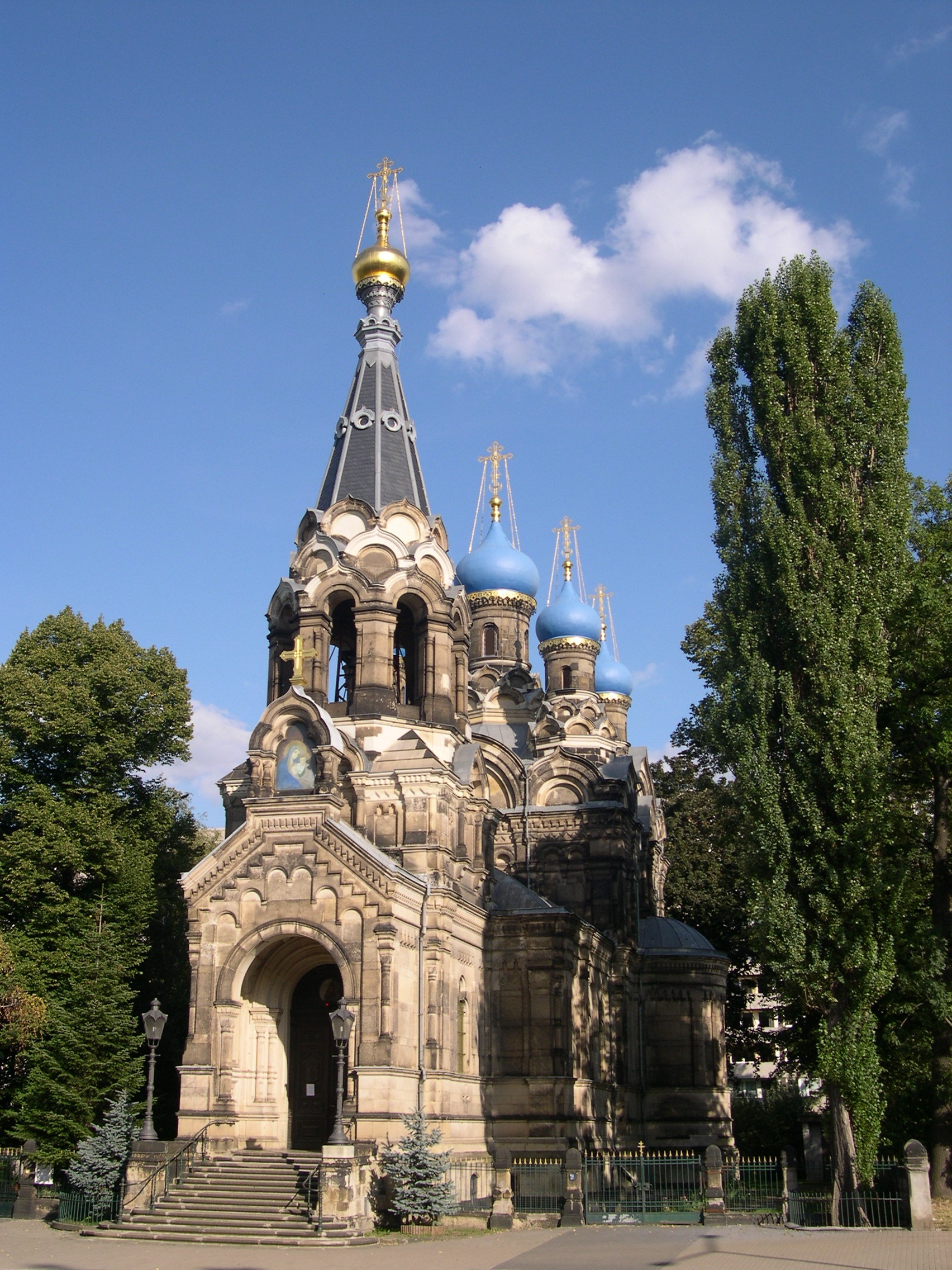
Russian Orthodox Church in Dresden, built in the 1870s

During the final decades of the imperial order in Russia many educated Russians sought to return to the Church and revitalize their faith. No less evident were non-conformist paths of spiritual searching known as God-Seeking. Writers, artists, and intellectuals in large numbers were drawn to private prayer, mysticism, spiritualism, theosophy, and Eastern religions. A fascination with elemental feeling, with the unconscious and the mythic, proliferated along with visions of coming catastrophe and redemption. The visible forms of God-Seeking were extensive.

A series of 'Religious–Philosophical Meetings' were held in Saint Petersburg in 1901–1903, bringing together prominent intellectuals and clergy to explore together ways to reconcile the Church with the growing of undogmatic desire among the educated for spiritual meaning in life. Especially after 1905, various religious societies arose, though much of this religious upheaval was informal: circles and salons, séances, private prayer. Some clergy also sought to revitalize Orthodox faith, most famously the charismatic Father John of Kronstadt, who, until his death in 1908 (though his followers remained active long after), emphasized Christian living and sought to restore fervency and the presence of the miraculous in liturgical celebration.

In 1909, a sensation-creating volume of essays appeared under the title Vekhi (Landmarks or Signposts), authored by a group of leading left-wing intellectuals, mostly former Marxists, who bluntly repudiated the materialism and atheism that had dominated the thought of the intelligentsia for generations as leading inevitably to failure and moral disaster.

One sees a similarly renewed vigor and variety in religious life and spirituality among the lower classes, especially after the upheavals of 1905. Among the peasantry we see widespread interest in spiritual-ethical literature and non-conformist moral-spiritual movements, as well as an upsurge in pilgrimage and other devotions to sacred spaces and objects (especially icons).There were also persistent beliefs in the presence and power of the supernatural (apparitions, possession, walking-dead, demons, spirits, miracles, and magic). The lower classes also stressed the vitality of local "ecclesial communities" actively shaping their own ritual and spiritual lives, sometimes in the absence of clergy, and defining their own sacred places and forms of piety. Various heterodox beliefs, which the Orthodox establishment branded as 'sectarianism', also flourished, including both non-Orthodox Christian denominations, notably Baptists, and various forms of deviant popular Orthodoxy and mysticism.

== Second patriarchate, 1917–present ==
=== Russian Revolution ===
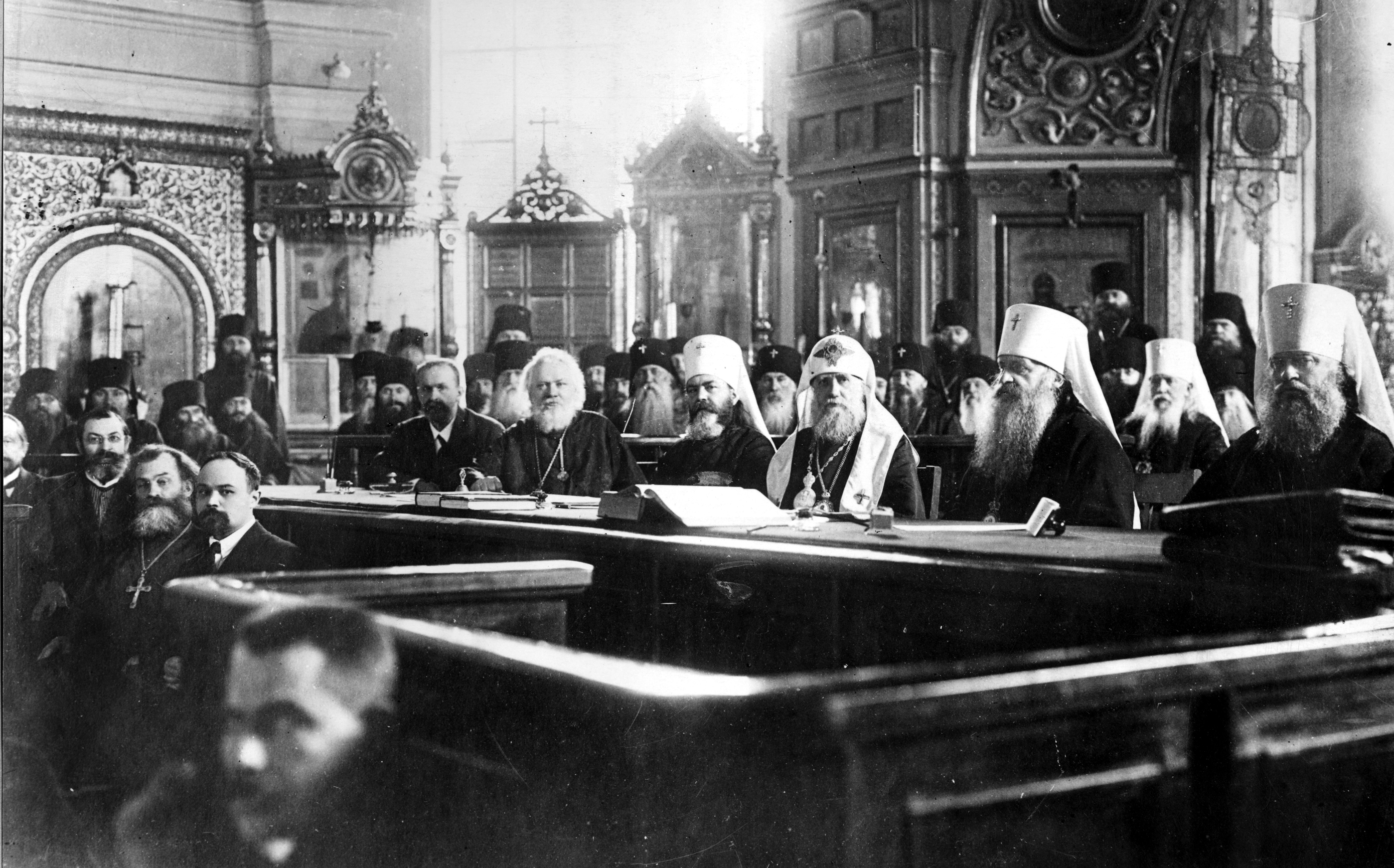
Highest authority of Russian Orthodox Church in 1917, following the election of St. Tikon as Patriarch

In 1914, in Russia, there were 55,173 Russian Orthodox churches and 29,593 chapels, 112,629 priests and deacons, 550 monasteries and 475 convents with a total of 95,259 monks and nuns.

The year 1917 was a major turning point for the history of Russia, and also the Russian Orthodox Church. The Russian Empire was dissolved and the Tsarist government – which had granted the Church numerous privileges – was overthrown. After a few months of political turmoil, the Bolsheviks took power in October 1917 and declared a separation of church and state. The government seized all church lands. Thus the Russian Orthodox Church found itself without official state backing for the first time in its history. One of the first decrees of the new Communist government (issued in January 1918) declared freedom of "religious and anti-religious propaganda". This led to a marked decline in the power and influence of the Church. The Church was also caught in the crossfire of the Russian Civil War that began later the same year, and many leaders of the Church supported what would ultimately turn out to be the losing side (the White movement).

Even before the end of the civil war and the establishment of the Soviet Union, the Russian Orthodox Church came under persecution of the Communist government. The Soviet government stood on a platform of militant atheism, viewing the church as a "counter-revolutionary" organization and an independent voice with a great influence in society. While the Soviet Union officially claimed religious toleration, in practice the government discouraged organized religion and did everything possible to remove religious influence from Soviet society.

The Russian Orthodox Church supported tsarist Russia, therefore creating another reason the Bolsheviks would attempt to diminish their influence on the Russian people and government.

=== Soviet era ===
The Soviets' official religious stance was one of "religious freedom or tolerance", though the state established atheism as the only scientific truth (see also the Soviet or committee of the All-Union Society for the Dissemination of Scientific and Political Knowledge or Znanie which was until 1947 called The League of the Militant Godless). Criticism of atheism was strictly forbidden and sometimes led to imprisonment.

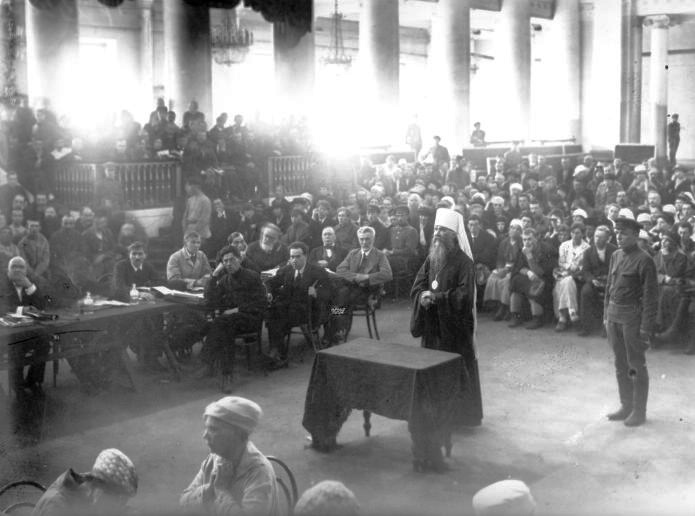
Metropolitan Benjamin addressing the Court during his 1922 trial for anti-Soviet agitation.

Some actions against Orthodox priests and believers along with execution included torture being sent to these prison camps and or labour camps or also mental hospitals. Many Orthodox (along with peoples of other faiths) were also subjected to psychological punishment or torture and mind control experimentation, in order to force them give up their religious convictions (see Piteşti prison).

In the first five years after the Bolshevik revolution, 28 bishops and 1,200 priests were executed. This included people like the Grand Duchess Elizabeth Fyodorovna who was at this point a monastic. Along with her murder was Grand Duke Sergei Mikhailovich Romanov; the Princes Ioann Konstantinovich, Konstantin Konstantinovich, Igor Konstantinovich and Vladimir Pavlovich Paley; Grand Duke Sergei's secretary, Fyodor Remez; and Varvara Yakovleva, a sister from the Grand Duchess Elizabeth's convent. They were herded into the forest, pushed into an abandoned mineshaft and grenades were then hurled into the mineshaft. Her remains were buried in Jerusalem, in the Church of Maria Magdalene.

==== Paris School of the Russian Religious Renaissance ====
In the early 1920s, Lenin expelled the leading Russian religious thinkers. Forced to leave Russia, these theologians settled in various European cities. The vessels which carried these intellectuals to Europe came to be known as the Philosophers' ships. With the establishment of the St. Sergius Orthodox Theological Institute in Paris in 1925, these émigré theologians began to teach and write about Orthodox theology in a distinctive new way. The Fin de siècle intellectual movement in theology and philosophy actually reached its full expression outside Russia in what is now called the Russian Religious Renaissance.

Theologian Paul L. Gavrilyuk explains that the Russian Religious Renaissance was an attempt to interpret all aspects of human existence: culture, politics, even economics, in Christian terms. This Renaissance was brought about by the generation of Nicholas Berdyaev, Sergius Bulgakov, Nicholas Lossky, and Lev Shestov.

==== Anti-religious campaign and persecution in the 1920s and 1930s ====
The sixth sector of the OGPU, led by Yevgeny Tuchkov, aggressively arrested and executed bishops, priests, and devout worshippers for refusing to hand in church valuables. Some 20,000 people were executed just outside Butovo, including many clergy, ascetics and laymen.

The church survived underground, and Freeze argues that the persecution in some ways made it stronger:

Indeed, the party's anti-religious policy arguably had a certain salutary effect: if nothing else, it helped to expunge the clerical dead wood, those who served from convenience rather than conviction. More important, the Bolsheviks unwittingly helped to foster religious revival in the 1920s: by demolishing the institutional church and shifting the authority to the parish, they helped to empower parishioners, above all, religious activists. It was precisely because these non-clerical tserkovniki so aggressively propagated the faith and defended their church that they would become a prime target of repression in the 1930s.

The mass closure of churches continued until 1939, by which time there was only a few hundred left. According to the official data of the government Commission on Rehabilitation: in 1937 136,900 Orthodox clerics were arrested, 85,300 of them were shot dead; in 1938 28,300 arrested, 21,500 of them shot dead; in 1939 1,500 arrested, 900 of them shot dead; in 1940 5,100 arrested, 1,100 of them shot dead.

The Solovki Special Purpose Camp was established in the monastery on the Solovetsky Islands in the White Sea. Eight metropolitans, twenty archbishops, and forty-seven bishops of the Orthodox Church died there, along with tens of thousands of the laity. Of these, 95,000 were put to death, executed by firing squad. Father Pavel Florensky was one of the New-martyrs of this particular period as well as Metropolitan Joseph (Ivan Petrovykh).

Many thousands of victims of persecution were subsequently recognized in a special canon of saints known as the "new-martyrs and confessors of Russia".

==== Patriarch Tikhon ====
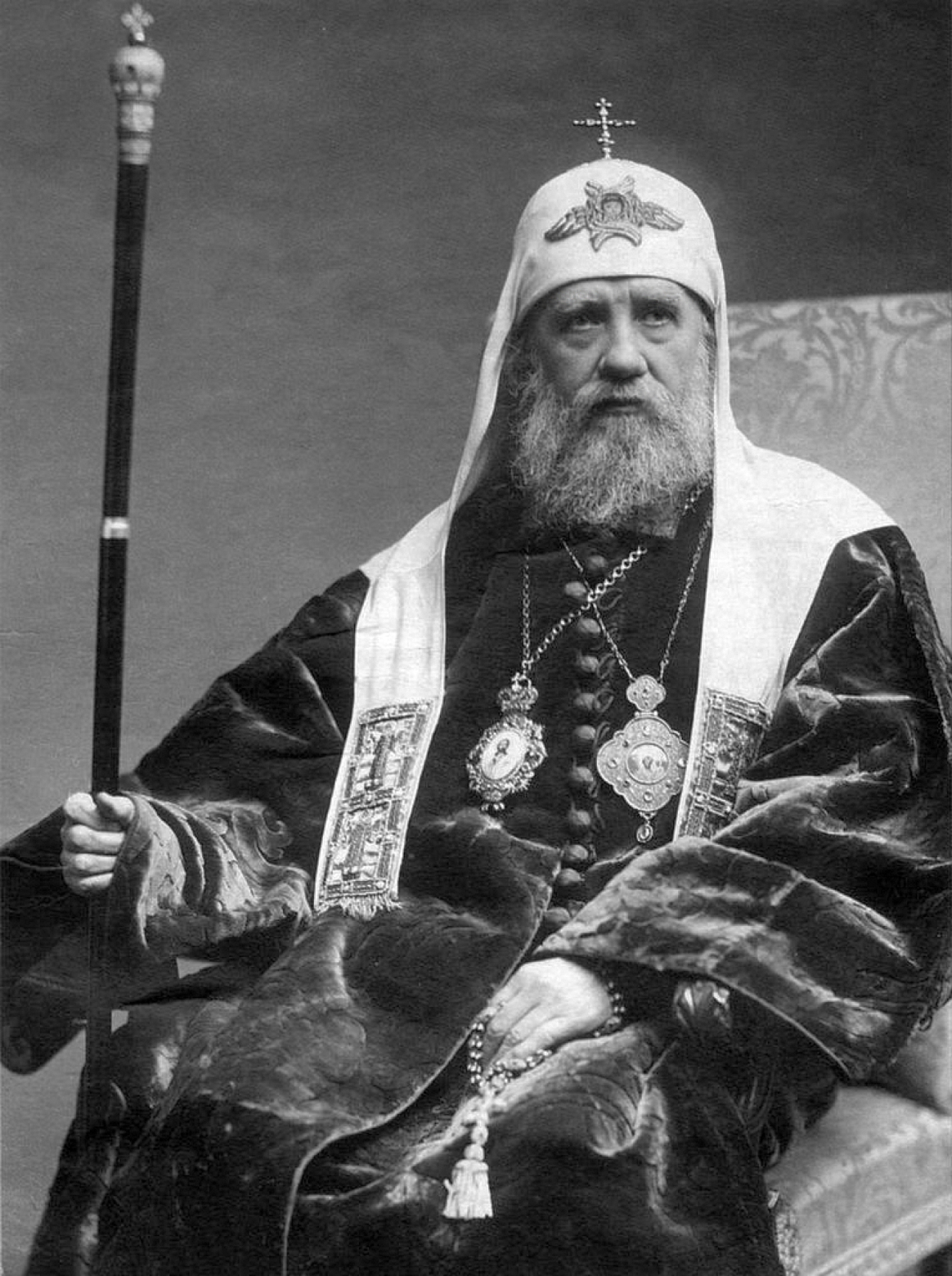
Patriarch Tikhon of Moscow.

Patriarch Tikhon antagonized the communist government, further degrading relations.

The Soviet authorities sponsored I Renovationist (officially called II All-Russian Council) in Moscow from April 29 to May 8, 1923, which apart from confirming the decisions concerning changes in the canonical rules of ordinations and clerical marriage, put Patriarch Tikhon (then under house arrest, awaiting civil trial) on ecclesiastic trial in absentia, dethroned him, stripped him of his episcopacy, priesthood and monastic status. The Council then resolved to abolish the Patriarchate altogether and to return to the "collegial" form of church government. Tikhon refused to recognize the authority of the Council and the validity of the "court" decision. The Council's decisions had no effect on the life of the Patriarchal or "Tikhonite" Church, which continued to exist, albeit on an illegal footing.

==== Metropolitan Sergius ====
When Tikhon died in 1925, the Soviet authorities forbade patriarchal elections to be held.

Patriarchal Locum Tenens (acting Patriarch) Metropolitan Sergius (Stragorodsky, 1887–1944), going against the opinion of a part of the Church's parishes, in 1927 issued an Appeal to the faithful, widely known as The Declaration of Metropolitan Sergius, which proclaimed loyalty towards the Soviet state and condemned political dissent within the Church. The Appeal made it clear that its purpose was "legalisation" of the Patriarchal Church's structures, namely The Temporary Patriarchal Synod. The legalisation had been granted by the authorities shortly thitherto. Moreover, he demanded pledges of loyalty to the Soviet state from all Russian Orthodox clergy abroad.

This, as well as the fact that his actions were seen by many as usurpation of the power that he was not entitled to, being a deputy of imprisoned Metropolitan Peter (Polyansky) (according to the XXXIV Apostolic canon), solidified the already existing split with the Russian Orthodox Church Outside of Russia abroad and provoked another split with the Russian True Orthodox Church (Russian Catacomb Church) within the Soviet Union.

==== World War II rapprochement ====
After Nazi Germany's attack on the Soviet Union in 1941, Joseph Stalin revived the Russian Orthodox Church to intensify patriotic support for the war effort. On September 4, 1943, Metropolitans Sergius (Stragorodsky), Alexius (Simansky) and Nicholas (Yarushevich) were officially received by Soviet leader Joseph Stalin. They received permission to convene a council on September 8, 1943, that elected Sergius Patriarch of Moscow and all Rus'. The Moscow Theological Academy and Seminary which had been closed since 1918 was re-opened.

==== Postwar era ====
Between 1945 and 1959 the number of open churches reached 25,000. By 1957 about 22,000 Russian Orthodox churches had become active. But in 1959 Nikita Khrushchev initiated his own campaign against the Russian Orthodox Church and forced the closure of about 12,000 churches. By 1985 fewer than 7,000 churches remained active. It is estimated that 50,000 clergy were executed by the end of the Khrushchev era. Members of the church hierarchy were jailed or forced out, their places taken by docile clergy, many of whom had ties with the KGB.

In the postwar era, having changed its political orientation, the Orthodox Church reviewed its traditional positions. It went on to approve the accomplishments of the socialist state, and it called on believers to participate in the international peace movement. Modernist tendencies grew stronger, even in the religious aspects of ideology and practice. For example, the church no longer glorified senseless suffering, which it once considered as a road of salvation.

Relations between the church and state improved considerably. For his work, Patriarch Pimen was awarded testimonials and personal medals by the Soviet Peace Fund (1969 and 1971) and the gold Fighter for Peace medal from the Soviet Peace Committee. His predecessor Patriarch Aleksy was awarded four Orders of the Red Banner of Labor and other medals of the USSR.

By 1987 the number of functioning churches in the Soviet Union stood at 6893 and the number of functioning monasteries to 18.

Citizens of the USSR were permitted to form religious societies for their religious needs if at least 20 believers reached the age of 18. Believers who composed an association performed religious rites, organized meetings for prayer, and other purposes connected to worship. They hired ministers and other persons to meet their needs, collected voluntary contributions in houses of worship for the support of their property. The Government granted the free use of houses of worship and other publicly owned property of the USSR. Russian Orthodox priests were trained at theological academies and seminaries.

In the Soviet Union the charitable and social work formerly done by ecclesiastical authorities were regulated by the government. Church owned property was nationalized. Places of worship were legally viewed as state property which the government permitted the church to use. After the advent of state-funded universal education, the Church's influence on education declined. Outside of sermons during the celebration of the divine liturgy it was restricted from evangelizing.

==== Glasnost ====
A pivotal point in the history of the Russian Orthodox Church came in 1988 with the 1000th anniversary of the Baptism of Kievan Rus': Throughout the summer of that year, major government-supported celebrations took place in Moscow and other cities. The 1988 Local Council of the Russian Orthodox Church met in Zagorsk; many older churches and some monasteries were reopened. An implicit ban on religious propaganda on state TV was finally lifted. For the first time in the history of Soviet Union, people could see live transmissions of church services on television.

=== Post-Soviet recovery ===
The Russian Orthodox Church Outside Russia (also known as the Russian Orthodox Church Abroad), based in New York City, is a jurisdiction of the church which was separated from Moscow for several decades. The Russian Orthodox Church Abroad was formed in the 1920s by Russian communities outside Communist Russia who refused to recognize the authority of the Russian Orthodox Church, as they believed it had fallen under the influence of the Bolsheviks. Relations between the two churches began improving in the 1990s, and there was a formal reconciliation in 2007 through the Act of Canonical Communion with the Moscow Patriarchate This agreement made the Church Abroad a mostly self-governing branch of the Russian Orthodox Church.

In November 2013, a large group of Russian entrepreneurs, public figures and scientists called for defining a special role of Orthodoxy in the Constitution. The appeal has been submitted to the president, the two houses of the Russian Parliament and Russian regional parliaments. The petitioners say their address was the final document of the conference titled "The Triumph and Collapse of an Empire: Lessons from History". According to them "The state sovereignty of the Russian Federation is law. Our call is for backing up its spiritual sovereignty, too, by declaring the Orthodoxy's special role in the Russian Constitution".

==== Churches in America ====
After resuming communication with Moscow in the early 1960s, and being granted autocephaly in 1970, the Metropolia became known as the Orthodox Church in America.

On 17 May 2007, the Russian Orthodox Church Outside Russia signed the Act of Canonical Communion with the Moscow Patriarchate. According to the provisions of the Act, the Moscow Patriarchate guarantees that ROCOR will maintain its independent hierarchy, continuing to be "an indissoluble, self-governing part of the Local Russian Orthodox Church", the only change being that when she elects a new First Hierarch, his election must be confirmed by the Patriarch of Moscow. In turn, ROCOR recognizes the Patriarch of Moscow as the head of the entire Russian Orthodox Church.

== See also ==
- History of Eastern Christianity
- History of the Eastern Orthodox Church

== Sources ==
- Dukes, Paul (1998). A History of Russia: Medieval, Modern, Contemporary, C. 882-1996. Duke University Press. ISBN 978-0-8223-2096-8.
- Fennell, John (14 January 2014). A History of the Russian Church to 1488. Routledge. ISBN 978-1-317-89720-0.
- Fennell, John (15 November 2023). The Emergence of Moscow, 1304–1359. Univ of California Press. ISBN 978-0-520-34759-5.
- Gavrilkin, Konstantin (3 February 2014). McGuckin, John Anthony (ed.). The Concise Encyclopedia of Orthodox Christianity. John Wiley & Sons. pp. 401–411. ISBN 978-1-118-75933-2.
- Kent, Neil (2021). A Concise History of the Russian Orthodox Church. Academica Press. ISBN 978-1-68053-907-3.
- Meyendorff, John (24 June 2010). Byzantium and the Rise of Russia: A Study of Byzantino-Russian Relations in the Fourteenth Century. Cambridge University Press. ISBN 978-0-521-13533-7.
- Rock, Stella (17 August 2006). Angold, Michael (ed.). The Cambridge History of Christianity: Volume 5, Eastern Christianity. Cambridge University Press. pp. 253–275. ISBN 978-0-521-81113-2.
- Shevzov, Vera (2012). Casiday, Augustine (ed.). The Orthodox Christian World. Routledge. pp. 15–40. ISBN 978-0-415-45516-9.
- Shubin, Daniel H. (2004). A History of Russian Christianity, Vol. I: From the Earliest Years through Tsar Ivan IV. Algora Publishing. ISBN 978-0-87586-287-3.
- Ziegler, Charles E. (13 October 2009). The History of Russia. Bloomsbury Publishing USA. ISBN 978-0-313-36308-5.
