= Elizabeth Bible =

1751 printed Church Slavonic translation of the Bible

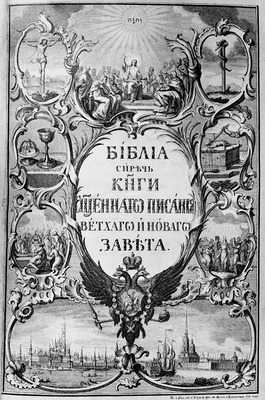
Title page of the Elizabeth Bible (1751)

The Elizabeth Bible (Russian: Елизаветинская Библия, romanized: Yelizavetinskaya Bibliya) is the authorized version of the Bible used by the Russian Orthodox Church. The Elizabeth Bible was the third complete printed edition of the Bible in Church Slavonic, published in Russia in 1751 under and with the assistance of Empress Elizabeth of Russia, the previous ones being the Ostrog Bible of 1581 and the Moscow Bible of 1663.

== History ==
In 1712, Peter I of Russia issued an ukaz ordering the printed Church Slavonic text to be carefully compared with the Greek of the Septuagint and to be made in every respect conformable to it. The revision was completed in 1724 and was ordered to be printed, but the death of Peter in 1725 prevented the execution of the order. The manuscript of the Old Testament of this revision is in the synodal library at Moscow.

Under Elizabeth of Russia, the work of revision was resumed by an ukaz issued in 1744, and in 1751, the revised Elizabeth Bible, as it is called, was published. Three other editions were published in 1756, 1757, and 1759, the second being somewhat of a revision.

== Sources used ==
The primary sources for the Elizabeth Bible include the Ostrog Bible of 1581 and the Moscow Bible of 1663.

The translation of the Old Testament (excluding Latin Esdras) was mainly based on a manuscript of the Codex Alexandrinus (c. 420) from Brian Walton's London Polyglot (1657). Third Esdras was translated from the Vulgate. Also, translators used the Codex Vaticanus (c. 350), the Editio Complutensis (1514–1517), the Editio Aldina (1518), and the Editio Sixtina (1587) in their work (see Septuagint).

== Reprints ==
All later reprints of the Russian Church Bible are based upon this second edition (1756), which, with minor corrections, is the current authorized version of the Russian Church.

== See also ==
- Bible translations into Church Slavonic
