= Ostrog Bible =

1581 printed Church Slavonic translation of the Bible

Title page of the Ostrog Bible, 19th-century facsimile edition

The Ostrog Bible (Ukrainian: Острозька Біблія, romanized: Ostroz’ka Bibliia; Russian: Острожская Библия, romanized: Ostrozhskaya Bibliya) was the first complete printed edition of the Bible in Church Slavonic, published in Ostrog (now Ostroh, Ukraine) in the Polish–Lithuanian Commonwealth by the printer Ivan Fyodorov in 1581 with the patronage of Konstanty Wasyl Ostrogski. It was based mainly on Gennady's Bible and was the primary source for the Moscow Bible published in 1663 under Alexis of Russia.

== Description ==
The main source for the Ostrog Bible was Gennady's Bible, which was completed in 1499 in Novgorod, Russia. The Ostrog Bible was translated not from the (Hebrew) Masoretic Text, but from the (Greek) Septuagint. This translation comprised seventy-six books of the Old and New Testaments and a manuscript of the Codex Alexandrinus. Some parts were based on Francysk Skaryna's translations.

The Ostrog Bible was printed on two dates: 12 July 1580, and 12 August 1581. The second version differs from the 1580 original in composition, ornamentation, and correction of misprints. In the printing of the Bible, delays occurred, as it was necessary to remove mistakes, to search for correct textual resolutions of questions, and to produce a correct translation. The editing of the Bible delayed printing. In the meantime, Fyodorov and his company printed other biblical books. The first were those that did not require correcting: the Psalter and the New Testament.

== Significance ==
The Ostrog Bible is a monumental publication of 1,256 pages, lavishly decorated with headpieces and initials, which were prepared especially for it. From the typographical point of view, the Ostrog Bible is irreproachable. This is the first Bible printed in Cyrillic type. It served as the original and model for further Russian publications of the Bible.

The importance of the first printed Cyrillic Bible can hardly be overestimated. Prince Ostrogski sent copies to Pope Gregory XIII and Russian tsar Ivan the Terrible, while the latter presented a copy to an English ambassador. When leaving Ostrog, Fyodorov took 400 books with him. Only 300 copies of the Ostrog Bible are extant today.

The Ostrog Bible was widely known in Ukraine, Russia, and Belarus, and also abroad. The Bodleian Library at Oxford University has a copy, and others were owned by King Gustavus Adolphus of Sweden and Cardinal Barberini, among many others. The Ostrog Bible later served as the primary source for the Moscow Bible published in 1663 under Alexis of Russia, and both were later used for the Elizabeth Bible of 1751.

The significance of the Ostrog Bible was enormous for Orthodox education, which had to resist strong Catholic pressure in Ukraine and Belarus.

== See also ==
- Bible translations into Church Slavonic
- Printing in Ukraine

== Sources ==
- 1663 Reprint of the Ostrog Bible revised by Arsenios the Greek, Zakariya Afanas'ev and two others, under the direction of the Patriarch Nikon
