= Moscow Bible =

1663 printed Church Slavonic translation of the Bible

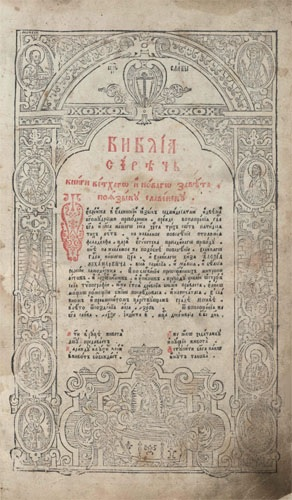
Moscow Bible of 1663

The Moscow Bible of 1663 (Russian: Московская Библия 1663 года) is the fourth printed translation of the Bible into a Slavic language, after the Prague Bible (1488), the Bible of Francysk Skaryna (1517–1519), and the Ostrog Bible (1581), the last of which it reprints with corrections.

Prepared by decree of Alexis of Russia and published in the Moscow Print Yard in 1663, it became the first Bible published in the Tsardom of Russia. The publication of the Bible was given special state importance. The editing of the Moscow Bible was carried out under the direction of Epiphanius Slavinetsky.

== History ==
=== Political context ===
At the beginning of the 17th century, after the period of the Time of Troubles, the Tsardom of Russia made attempts to unify different spheres of life. These processes also affected the structure of the Russian Orthodox Church, which was associated with both internal changes in the country and foreign policy where the Tsardom sought to strengthen its authority, spread its influence, and defend of the Orthodox faith.

The existing Stoglav Synod, which worked to isolate the Russian Orthodox Church from foreign influence, was not meeting the needs of the Russian state, whose international position was improving in the second half of the 17th century. This development, as well as the construction of a government printing house that produced and distributed religious literature, led to an inquiry about the editing of the Russian Church's liturgical books. Because of translation errors in previous versions, they were sometimes burned or abandoned. However, the most important reason for the republication of liturgical books was the desire to improve relations with Ukrainian Orthodoxy. At the time, Ukraine was in the process of joining the Russian state. One challenge to this process was that during the first half of the 17th century, Ukrainian Orthodoxy was perceived as heretical by some within the Russian Orthodox Church because some of their religious rites were closer to those of the Greek Orthodox Church. The unification of religious texts using the Greek texts as a model was one of the ways the state sought to achieve it political goals.

The main religious book containing all the basics of Orthodoxy is the Slavic Bible. However, revising it was a rather difficult task, since even small changes in liturgical literature caused an impassioned reaction from more conservative circles of the clergy. The ruling strata wanted religious literature to be corrected according to the models of the Greek Church, while conservative circles of the clergy opposed this, which forced the Russian tsar to become involved. In order to strengthen the authority of the Russian Orthodox Church, Alexis of Russia and Patriarch Nikon of Moscow decided it was necessary to seek direction from the Greek Orthodox Church. In 1648, Alexis asked for several Greek-speaking scholars to be sent to Moscow "for reference of the Greek Bible for the Slavic speech". Thus, in 1663, an edition of the Moscow Bible was published under the leadership of Epiphanius Slavinetsky.

=== Sources ===
As editor of the Moscow Bible, Epiphanius Slavinetsky indicated that its main primary source is the Ostrog Bible of 1581. The main source for bringing the Russian of the text up to the norm of the 17th century is the Grammar of Meletius Smotrytsky (1648) and other southwestern Russian-language editions of the same period.

The Moscow Bible is connected with the Septuagint, the Vulgate, Gennady's Bible, and the Ostrog Bible through marginal glosses that calque Greek grammatical features. For example, in the gloss to Exodus, where the meaning "unreasonable" is given, the margin presents a lexical calque from the Greek for "wordless", a usage already attested in the Chronicle of George Hamartolos (c. 948) and the Izbornik of Sviatoslav II of Kiev (1073).

== See also ==
- Bible translations into Church Slavonic
- Bible translations into Slavic languages
