= Bible translations into Church Slavonic =

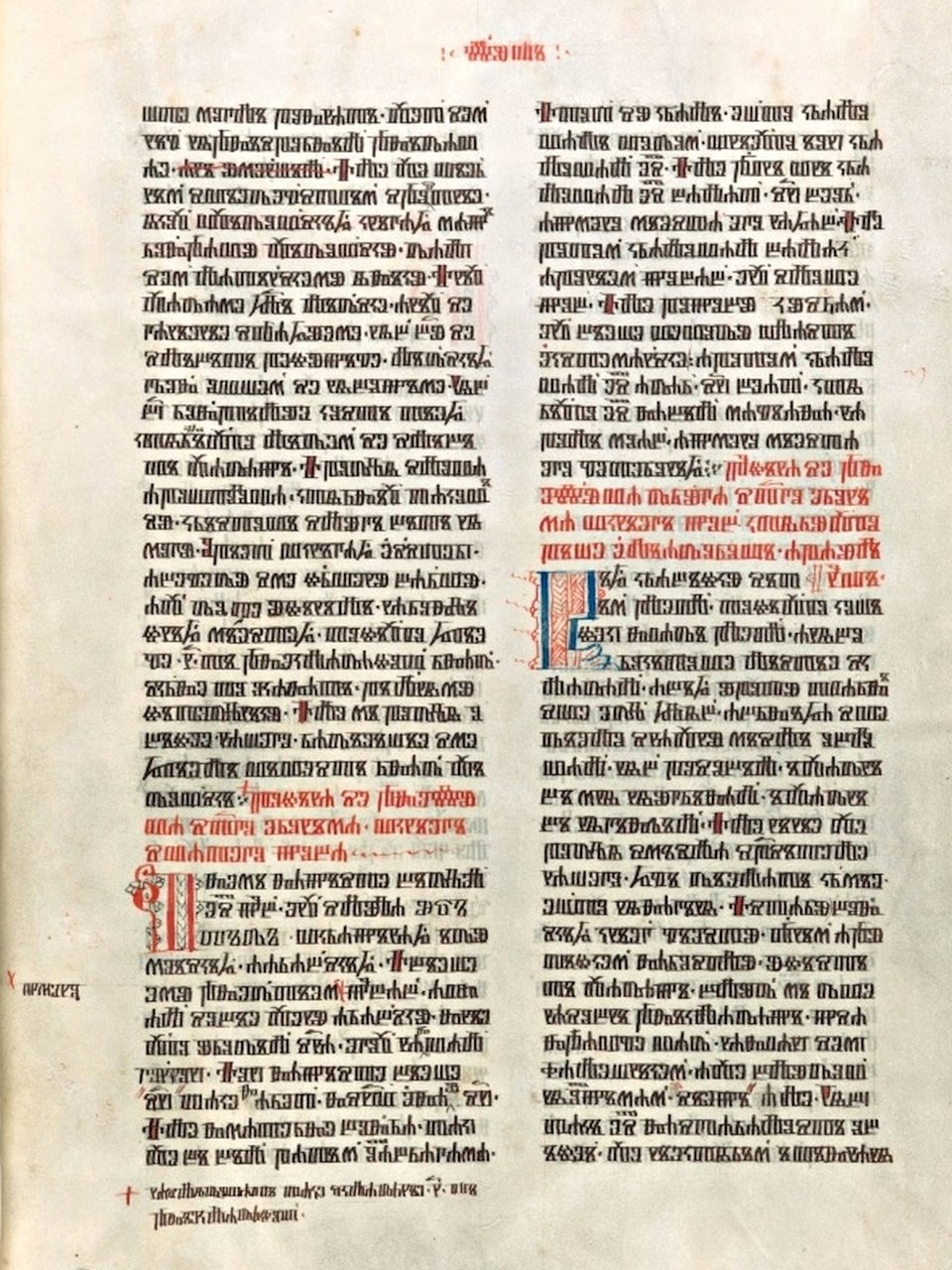
The Glagolitic Bible (1416)

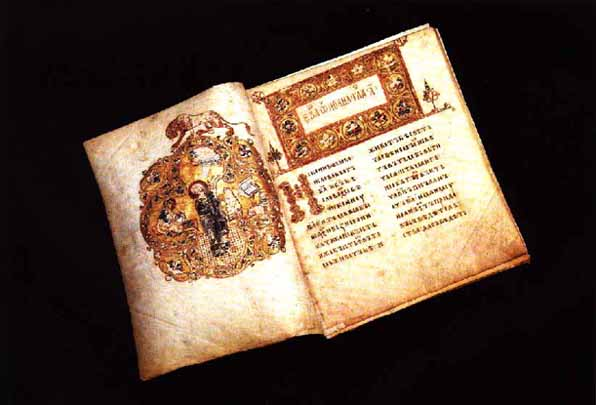
The Ostromir Gospel from Novgorod, Russia (1057)

The oldest translation of the Bible into a Slavic language, Old Church Slavonic, has close connections with the activity of the two apostles to the Slavs, Cyril and Methodius, in Great Moravia in 864–865. The oldest manuscripts use either the so-called Cyrillic or the Glagolitic alphabets. Cyrillic reflects the Greek majuscule writing style of the 9th century with the addition of new characters for Slavic sounds not used in the Greek of that time. Glagolitic writing differs from any other writing system.

The oldest manuscripts use the Glagolitic script, which is older than the Cyrillic. The oldest manuscripts extant belong to the 10th or 11th century.

== Church Slavonic versions ==
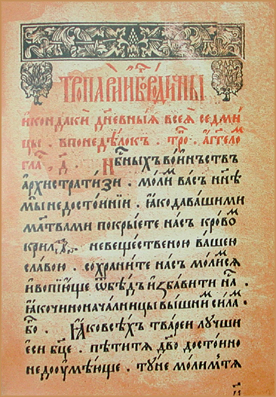
Psalter of Ivan Fyodorov, 1570

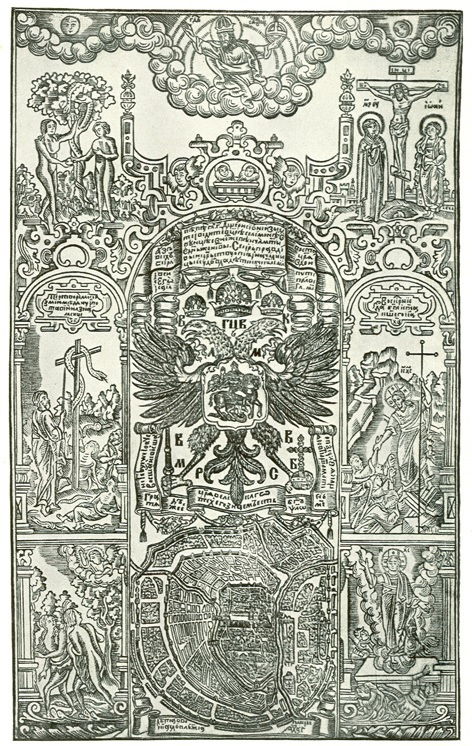
From the Moscow Bible of 1663

The first complete manuscript translation of the Bible into Church Slavonic was completed in 1499 in Novgorod, Russia, under the auspices of Archbishop Gennady of Novgorod (r. 1484–1504); the translators and compilers of the Old Testament based their work partly on the Vulgate and partly on the Septuagint tradition, and thus, the collection marked the "first serious victory of Western scholasticism on Russian soil". The New Testament text relies on the Old Church Slavonic translation. The 1499 Bible, called the Gennady's Bible is now housed in the State History Museum on Red Square in Moscow.

During the 16th century a greater interest arose in the Bible in South and West Russia, owing to the controversies between adherents of the Orthodox Church and the Latin Catholics and Greek-Catholics. In the second half of the 16th century the Gospels, Acts, and Epistles, and parts of the Psalter were often printed at Lviv and Vilnius, though the oldest printed edition of the Acts and Epistles was issued at Moscow in 1564.

In 1581 Ivan Fyodorov published the first printed edition of the Church Slavonic Bible at Ostrog: Fyodorov's edition used a number of Greek manuscripts, besides Gennady's Bible.

The fourth major revision within the Church Slavonic Bible tradition was the Moscow Bible, which was carried out under the direction of Epiphanius Slavinetsky in 1663 at the request of Tsar Alexei Mikhailovich.

In 1712, Tsar Peter the Great issued an ukaz ordering the printed Slavonic text to be carefully compared with the Greek of the Septuagint and to be made in every respect conformable to it. The revision, completed in 1724, was ordered to be printed, but the death of Peter (1725) prevented the execution of the order. The synodal library in Moscow retains the manuscript of the Old Testament of this revision.

Under the Empress Elizabeth the work of revision was resumed by an ukaz issued in 1744, and in 1751 a revised "Elizabeth" Bible, as it is called, appeared. Three other editions were published in 1756, 1757, and 1759, the second somewhat revised. All later reprints of the Russian Church Bible are based upon this second edition, which has become the authorized version of the Russian Orthodox Church.

== See also ==
- Bible translations into Slavic languages
