= History of Eastern Christianity =

Christianity has been, historically, a Middle Eastern religion with its origin in Judaism. Eastern Christianity refers collectively to the Christian traditions and churches which developed in the Middle East, Egypt, Asia Minor, the Far East, Balkans, Eastern Europe, Northeastern Africa and southern India over several centuries of religious antiquity. It is contrasted with Western Christianity, which developed in Western Europe. As a historical definition the term relates to the earliest Christian communities and their long-standing traditions that still exist.

== Overview ==
Christianity emerged as a distinct religion from Second Temple Judaism in Roman Palestine. Having incorporated converts from both Jewish and gentiles, Christianity was opposed both by Rabbinic Judaism and Roman Empire (see Persecution of early Christians by the Romans) from its inception and was forced immediately into an underground movement. Since the First century, Christianity had spread immediately to both western and eastern halves of the Greco-Roman world and beyond. Eastern Christianity denoted Christian traditions and church families that are rooted and developed during classical and late antiquity in the Eastern Mediterranean region and their later extensions of spread.

Presence and formation of the Christianity in the East is attributed by Sacred Tradition and Apostolic Succession to the Apostles, being directly commissioned and the Seventy Disciples of the Apostles (see Thaddeus of Edessa and Ananias of Damascus) along with the Seven Deacons, indirectly as extension of the former. This identity is reinforced by the fact that much of the New Testament epistles are directed to Hellenic-speaking cities in Asia Minor and Greece, whilst also mentioning places took place in the Eastern Mediterranean region.

Church of Jerusalem was established with appointment of James, brother of Jesus by other apostles as its first bishop whereas Church of Antioch was established jointly by Apostle Peter and Apostle Paul with the former as its first bishop. Churches in Greece, Mediterranean islands, and Asia Minor were founded variously by Apostle Paul, Apostle Andrew, Apostle John, Apostle Philip, and Apostle Peter. Church of Alexandria was established by Apostle Peter through his appointment of Mark the Evangelist as its first bishop.

Beyond borders of Roman Empire, Apostle Jude and Apostle Bartholomew founded the church of Armenia. Apostle Andrew and Apostle Simon established Churches in Kingdom of Iberia and Colchis respectively. Apostle Matthew is held as the apostle sent to Ethiopia whilst also attributed presence of the Christianity in the region through conversion of Ethiopian eunuch by Philip the Deacon. Apostle Thomas himself is held to be founder of churches of Mesopotamia and Indian coast, being the furthest reach of Christianity in antiquity.

Eastern Christianity was then solidified and institutionalized through the conversions of states that hosted these churches. Early Church went sudden transformation from underground, persecuted but growing minority into established state religion. Chief of these religious shift are conversion of Armenia in 301 AD, eastern Georgia around 329-337 AD, Kingdom of Axum around 329 AD, and Roman Empire around 380 AD through Edict of Thessalonica.

Christianity in the East experienced several Christological controversies that resulted in the emergence of Church of the East and Oriental Orthodox Churches as two distinct churches separate from Chalcedonian Christianity.

Division of remaining Greek-speaking Eastern and Western Christianity was sharpened following Fall of Western Roman Empire from 476 onwards. Despite attempt by its surviving Eastern half to reconquer it, it was rapidly undone in the following century. Both Eastern and Western halves of Mediterranean world lost their mutual overlapping around the beginning of seventh century as the Western Europe increasingly lost access to Greek language while East lost access to the Latin. Official bilingualism was abolished by Emperor Heraclius upon his accession to the throne in 610 AD.

Isolation between East and West was solidified further after Muslim conquests and the ensuing Iconoclasm. Thereafter, broader pattern emerged between Eastern and Western Christianity that contributed to their permanent division. Eastern Christianity was shaped by its relationship with the state through symphonia as an enduring legacy of state church of the Roman Empire that survived in the East. This pattern was later copied by various monarchies outside Roman Empire in the East that established the church as its state religion such as Bulgaria and medieval Rus'. Whereas Western Christianity was shaped by Papal temporal power that became source of various monarchies' legitimacy that converted to Nicene Christianity from Arianism and paganism in the West. This was then solidified around the time of formation of Carolingian Empire and later, Holy Roman Empire, with both act as oppositions to Roman claim in the East.

Growing divergence of the Eastern and Western Christianity was eventually translated into Great Schism around eleventh century onwards. Despite numerous attempts of reconciliation from both sides, growing antagonism was proven irreversible following the Crusades and subsequent Ottoman conquests.

As globalization increasingly takes place in the Modern era, Eastern Christianity spread beyond their traditional territories.

== Ethnic groups ==
Jewish Christians, Albanian Christians, Assyrian Christians, Aramean Christians, Armenian Christians, Georgian Christians, Maronite Christians, Arab Christians, Indian Christians, Greek Christians, Egyptian Christians, Ethiopian Christians, Persian Christians, Kurdish Christians, Turkish Christians, Slavic Christians, Maltese Christians and Eastern European (Balkan) Christians.

=== Pentarchy ===
The churches that were the original churches founded by the Apostles were later established as authority centers under the Pentarchy of Patriarchs.

- Rome (Sts. Peter and Paul), i.e. the Pope, the only Pentarch in the Western Roman Empire.
- Constantinople (St. Andrew), currently in Turkey
- Alexandria (St. Mark), currently in Egypt
- Antioch (St. Peter), currently in Syria
- Jerusalem (St. James), currently in Israel/Palestine

== Common characteristics of Eastern Christianity ==
=== Eastern Christianity ===
The church as established in the Middle East was done so under the concept of unity i.e. catholic and or ecumenical. For the earliest Christian communities, the concept of unity was one in which the church communities agreed on a doctrinal understanding of Christianity. Such an understanding was based on the tradition of unity within the different ancient Christian communities. One such tradition is the biblical texts used by each of the ancient communities or churches. Unity was established in what was taught to the communities by Christ and then his apostles which was doctrinal in its expression. When various persons or groups within the many ancient Christian communities began to disagreed with innovations or interpretations of the traditions of Christianity, the communities set out to clarify the validity of the variation in the comparison to traditional understanding, to establish why this change was to be accepted or rejected. Such was the case of the first council in Jerusalem. The later councils were prompted to clarify tradition and address what was proper and what was improper, proper being what was established by Jesus Christ and then his apostles, then the Seventy and the clergy of the churches and the Patristic text, that take their lineage directly back to the Apostolic era. Innovations were those that changed the understanding that Christian communities had as the basis for the understanding and definition of their religion. Articulation of Tradition was then defined as dogma, being that which mystically created a relationship between each individual and the personal Triune God. Any innovation which cut off this relationship was therefore to be condemned.

This right believing and right teaching was to first establish in each individual a personal relationship with Christ, the God. This original teaching established by a community of persons that through these traditions created and then maintained a relationship with God. As various teachings appeared the Church as a united community addressed and confirmed or denied the teaching or teachings. Tradition was the cornerstone to how teachings were to be deemed valid since tradition itself cultivated a living relationship with the living God. The councils which were conducted after the legalization of Christianity were done so to define what Christianity and a Christian was. This in contrast to Paganism and Judaism and the various non-traditional Christian beliefs of the time. The Christian communities not within the regions of the Empire of Rome still communicated with one another and it was the break out of the sectarian and deemed new to tradition, teachings of Arius that caused the communities to gather to define what a Christian was and to use this definition to counter the teachings of Arianism.

=== Eastern Christian ecclesiastics ===
==== Ecclesiastical structure of the Eastern churches ====
Eastern Christianity is commonly defined through conciliarity as highest norm of governance within the universal church as opposed to Papal supremacy demonstrated by its decentralized nature. Major Eastern Christian centers were already established since Late Antiquity and were later institutionalized following the conversion of various monarchies that adopted the church as state religion. These monarchies later sought further ecclesiastical sovereignty in their own sphere, thereby increased number of autocephalous churches within their universal communion.

As post-Enlightenment nationalism threatened both transnational character of Eastern Christian communion and ecclesiastical unity between diverse ethnicities within same canonical territory at the exclusion of another, Phyletism was condemned as heresy in the 19th century to prevent further division of the universal church according to ethnicity.

==== Ecclesiastic services or liturgy ====
Eastern Christianity consisted of multiple liturgical families present amongst its communions. This diversities were ultimately traced back to two main liturgical traditions of Antiochene Rite and Alexandrian Rite. Diversities derived from these rites were solidified following the Christological schisms that resulted in the emergence of distinct patriarchates from each other.

Eastern Orthodoxy predominantly and almost uniformly followed Constantinopolitan rite with slight local variations. This rite is derived from Antiochene Rite with significant distinct elements from Mar Saba and Stoudios monasteries.

Historic Church of the East and its successors uniformly used East Syriac rite that is based on Antiochene Rite as present around Edessa. This rite historically also shaped the formation of Suriyani Malayalam in Indian coasts.

Oriental Orthodox communion preserved several rites. Both Armenian rite preserved by Armenian Apostolic Church and West Syriac rite (including its derivation, Malankara Rite) preserved by Syriac Orthodox Church and Malankara Orthodox Church ultimately came from Antiochene Rite. Whereas Coptic rite preserved by Coptic Orthodox Church and its derivation, Ge'ez held by Orthodox Tewahedo churches ultimately traced back to Alexandrian Rite.

Following Uniatism from sixteenth century onwards, Eastern Catholic Churches that emerged from the bodies of existing Eastern Christianity and seek full communion with the Papacy are allowed to retain their liturgical rites with various degrees of liturgical latinizations, thus constituted distinct liturgical patrimonies within the Catholic Church.

=== Clergy ===
The clergy of the Eastern churches are the bishops, priests, and deacons, the same offices identified in the New Testament and found in the early church. Bishops include archbishops, metropolitans, and patriarchs. Priests (also called presbyters or elders) include archpriests, protopresbyters, hieromonks (priest-monks), and archimandrites (senior hieromonks). Deacons also include hierodeacons (deacon-monks), archdeacons, and protodeacons; subdeacons, however, are not deacons, and comprise a separate office that is not to be major clergy, as do readers, acolytes and others. Bishops are usually drawn from the ranks of the monks, and are required to be celibate; however, a non-monastic priest may be ordained to the episcopate if he no longer lives with his wife (following Canon XII of the Quinisext Council). In contemporary usage such a non-monastic priest is usually tonsured to the monastic state at some point prior to his consecration to the episcopacy.

=== Ascetic or Charismatic orders ===
- Monastic or Ascetic Orders

=== Pre-Ecumenical Christian heresies ===
Meetings between Christian communities or churches were held before the Ecumenical councils. These meetings however were not as large because the Christian Church was still an illegal community. These early meetings and correspondence lead to the clarification of early heresies.

- Antinomianism
- Donatist
- Ebionites
- Gnosticism
- Marcionism
- Millennialism
- Monarchianism
- Montanism
- Sabellianism

Post-Legalized Christianity and the Ecumenical Councils

- Arianism
- Apollinarism
- Audianism
- Anomoeanism
- Messalians
- Macedonians (religious group)
- Paulicianism/Bogomilism
- Pelagianism/Semipelagianism
- Priscillianism
- Psilanthropism
- Iconoclasm
- Monothelitism
- Origenism

== Eastern Orthodox Christianity ==
Christianity began as a distinct movement within Second Temple Judaism before spread into furthest reach of the Classical world. Hebrew (Semitic), Egyptian, Greek, Roman and Arab Christian communities of the Mediterranean faced various opposition from governments, opposing religions, and splinter groups from within their own faith. Notion of orthodoxy however, preceded both imperial legalization and imperial adoption of Christianity as state religion as early Christian figures and synods demonstrated that heresy can indeed result in severance from the universal church without being enforced by the state.

A marked change in the life of the church occurred in 313 when Emperor Constantine the Great proclaimed the Edict of Milan and legalized Christianity within the Roman Empire. This act marked the beginning of involvement of the Roman state both on the facilitation and enforcement of ecclesiastical affairs, which increasingly was seen as its sources of legitimacy within framework of symphonia. This process was eventually culminated in adoption of the Trinitarian Christian church as sole religion of the Roman Empire up until demise of its continuation.

Despite ongoing state support from the Roman Empire and later its neighbors, Christian church found themselves unable to prevent subsequent series of controversies that emerged within the church and later, imperial power themselves that was entangled with the former in an attempt to secure both legitimacy and conduciveness for stability. Eastern Roman Empire was struck by two Christological controversies in the fifth century. The first one was solved with the deposition of Nestorius and the banishment of his like-minded fellows to neighboring Persia where Christian church there had incentive to separate as far as possible from being associated with Roman power. The second one however, was proven to be enduring within borders of Roman Empire itself and causes serious and long-term destabilizations where series of Emperors attempted enforced silence, enforced compromise, and outright mutual persecutions that seriously destabilized the Empire.

In the early seventh century, final conflict with Persia witnessed the collapse of Eastern Roman territorial integrity into Sassanid occupation chiefly assisted by resentful non-Chalcedonians population that welcomed Persian aggression as liberation. This incentivized imperial power to once again enact enforced compromise, that backfired from both sides. When Arab conquest swept the region, dissenting population once again repeated collaboration with the invaders and was again reacted with another enforced compromise.

Loss of the richest southern Roman provinces proven to be an opportunity to consolidate remaining relatively homogenous Greek-speaking population in Balkan and Anatolia by adopting clarified theological stance that no longer seek to appease significant amount of population in hope of conduciveness. The same loss, however, triggered religious trauma that was later projected against religious images. This stance was later enforced by imperial power twice through series of persecutions before being rejected for one final time.

Religious unity and stability that followed the end of Iconoclastic controversy enabled Eastern Roman Empire to spread Christianity toward Slavic nations and to once again expand into lands previously lost to them centuries before, including lands still inhabited by non-Chalcedonian population. This time however, the Eastern Roman Empire uncompromisingly took unequivocal antagonistic stance and vigorously disarming and dismantling these buffer powers that backfired spectacularly in the end of eleventh century.

Decline of the Eastern Roman Empire ever since the disastrous defeat at the hands of the Turks witnessed increasing dependence and even forced subjugation into the Western church which also simultaneously was alienating each other. This dependence lasted until the very end of the empire in the series of forced compromise and persecutions even after despite outright sack and occupation by Frankish powers. These decisions were enacted mainly to prevent further aggression by Western powers and later, to appeal for help against rising Ottoman Empire.

By the end of the Eastern Roman Empire, what remained of was once state church of the Roman civilization had lost any incentive to appease the West, and was passed unto Rum millet and to still independent Orthodox population in Russia. The Eastern Orthodox Church thus, emerged from Middle Ages unto modern era with consolidated identity that rejected any perceived past attempts for its alteration. This common identity was later further solidified when Uniatism established parallel churches out of former members of Eastern Orthodox Church hierarchies across their traditional homelands.

== Saint Thomas Christians ==
St. Thomas Christians are natives of the southern Indian state of Kerala. These Christians of Malabar trace their roots back to St. Thomas, the Apostle who arrived along the Malabar Coast in the year AD 52. In their tradition, St. Thomas is referred to as Mar Thoma Sleeha which translates roughly as Lord/Saint Thomas the Apostle.

St Thomas Christians had a unique identity till the arrival of Portuguese in India, who tried to convert St. Thomas Christians in their area of control to the Latin Church through the Synod of Diamper of 1599. As a result of this foreign intervention into their culture there are several present day St. Thomas denominations, primarily in the Catholic and Oriental Orthodox traditions.

Among the St. Thomas Christians, now the largest church in terms of membership is the Syro-Malabar Church, a major archepiscopal sui juris Church in Communion with the Bishop of Rome with a membership approaching four million adherents. The other denominations include the Malankara Syriac Orthodox Church (Jacobite Syrian Church), Malankara Orthodox Syrian Church (Indian Orthodox Church), Malankara Marthoma Syrian Church and Malankara Syriac Catholic Church (Syro-Malankara Catholic Church).

== Byzantine Rite Lutheranism ==
Byzantine Rite Lutheranism arose in the Ukrainian Lutheran Church around 1926. It sprung up in the region of Galicia and its rites are based on the Liturgy of St. John Chrysostom. The church suffered persecution under the Communist régime, which implemented a policy of state atheism.

== Ecumenical councils ==
=== Eastern Orthodoxy ===
The heresy of Arius was rejected in the community of Christians in the regions of the Pentarchy. This also included the communities of Christians of the far East (the Assyrian Churches) and the churches of Africa (Ethiopians). Churches that were not under the control of Rome. Several doctrinal disputes from the 4th century onwards led to the calling of ecumenical councils which from a traditional perspective, are the culmination and also a continuation of previous church synods. The first ecumenical council in part was a continuation of Trinitarian doctrinal issues addressed in pre-legalization of Christianity councils or synods (see Synods of Antioch between 264-269AD). These ecumenical councils with their doctrinal formulations are pivotal in the history of Christianity in general and to the history of Eastern Christianity. The tradition was not new, but was now public and no longer were the ancient Christian communities forced to hide, but could now meet with all of the clergy out in the open. Even with churches outside the regions of the Byzantine Empire. This would somewhat change.

==== Church of the East ====
It was not until the third ecumenical council (see First Council of Ephesus) that the Assyrian Church of the East and the churches of Asia, parted ways in schism with the Eastern Orthodox Church, the church of Byzantium which was still united with Rome.

==== Oriental Orthodox Churches ====
Later councils to define the tenets of the community of Christianity, caused the Oriental Orthodox community to part in schism as well (see the Council of Chalcedon). The churches or communities at this point were National churches so a great deal of nationalistic sentiments played into the various schisms.

=== Nationalistic ecclesiastical characteristics ===
There was a degree of nationalistic animosity between the different communities that were united in Christ. Past historical conflicts between these different groups also fed the sentiments of division. As an understanding of the sensitivities of ethnic and or nationalistic characteristics, the early churches did implement nationalistic identities. Hence the establishment of the Greek, Coptic, Armenian, Russian churches. This was balanced with the tradition of churches also being named more for location rather than Nationalistic identity i.e. the church of Antioch or the church of Jerusalem.

- Alexandria (St. Mark), currently in Egypt note: After the Council of Chalcedon the Coptic churches and Byzantine churches went into schism.
- Antioch (St. Peter), currently in Turkey
- Jerusalem (St. James), currently in Israel/Palestine
- Constantinople (St. Andrew), currently in Turkey
- Serbian Patriarch
- Patriarch of Moscow
- Patriarch of Romania

=== Syriac Christianity ===
Syriac Christianity has a long history. It was traditionally centered in Persian ruled Assyria/Mesopotamia and Roman ruled Syria. Christianity had a strong presence from the early days of the Church, particularly among the Semitic peoples of the region who spoke various dialects of Aramaic, the language of Jesus Christ. Syriac Christianity was divided into West Syrian and Eastern Rite traditions. The two major bodies in the West Syrian tradition were the Syriac Orthodox Church, an Oriental Orthodox (Monophysite) church, and the Maronite Church, an Eastern Catholic church in communion with the pope, though splits and realignments happened later. The East Syrian tradition was represented by the Church of the East, the Christian church of Persian ruled Assyria and Mesopotamia.

The Church of the East (most of whose members are ethnic Assyrians) traced its origins to the evangelism of Saint Paul and Saint Thomas. The Church traces its roots after the apostles to the See of Babylon, said to have been founded by Saint Thomas. In the 5th century the Church of the East offered protection to followers of the Nestorian movement, declared heretical in the Roman Empire at the First Council of Ephesus. As such it accepted only the first two Ecumenical Councils — the Council of Nicaea and the First Council of Constantinople — as defining its faith tradition. Despite severe persecutions, the Church of the East prospered under the Parthian and Sasanian empires and, following the Muslim conquest of Persia, the Islamic Caliphate. During the era of the Islamic Empire, the Church of the East was made a protected dhimmi community and largely maintained their autonomy; in a fatwa, the Islamic Prophet Muhammad demanded the protection of the Assyrian people of Mesopotamia.

The Church of the East spread widely through Asia, establishing churches and dioceses in India (the Saint Thomas Christians), Central Asia, and China, home to a Nestorian community from the 7th–10th centuries and again in the 13th–14th centuries. Subsequently, however, a series of misfortunes sent the church into decline, and by the 14th century it was largely confined to Mesopotamia/Iraq, south eastern Anatolia/Turkey, north western Persia/Iran and north eastern Syria and the Malabar Coast of India. It remains centered in these areas to this day. In the 16th century, the church went into schism, resulting in the formation of two churches with rival patriarchs: the Assyrian Church of the East and the Chaldean Catholic Church, which eventually entered into communion with Rome.

Ecumenism between the Assyrian Church and the Roman Catholic Church is an ongoing process. Most recently, on November 11, 1994, a historic meeting of Patriarch Mar Dinkha IV and Pope John Paul II took place in the Vatican and a Common Christological Declaration was signed. One side effect of this meeting was that the Assyrian Church's relationship to the Chaldean Catholic Church was improved.

=== Oriental Orthodoxy ===
Oriental Orthodoxy refers to the communion of Eastern Christian churches that recognize only the first three ecumenical councils — the First Council of Nicaea (325 AD), the First Council of Constantinople (381) and the Council of Ephesus (431) — and reject the dogmatic definitions of the Council of Chalcedon (451). Hence, these churches are also called Old Oriental Churches. Despite potentially confusing nomenclature, Oriental Orthodox churches are distinct from the churches that collectively refer to themselves as Eastern Orthodoxy.

The Coptic Orthodox Church of Alexandria is considered the spiritual leader of the Oriental Orthodox Churches. The spiritual leadership is not in the same sense understood for the one extended among the Eastern Orthodox churches to the Church of Constantinople; it is however, in the spirit of respect and honor for the Apostolic Throne of Alexandria. It does not give any prerogatives, jurisdiction or rights to the Church of Alexandria in any way as in the Eastern Orthodox Churches. Historically, the church has been labeled monophysite because it rejected the decisions of the Council of Chalcedon, which condemned monophysitism. The Armenian body of the church officially severed ties with the West in 554, during the second Council of Dvin where the dyophysite formula of the Council of Chalcedon was rejected. The Oriental Orthodox Churches argues that this is a wrong description of its position, as it considers Monophysitism, as taught by Eutyches and condemned at Chalcedon, a heresy and only disagrees with the formula defined by that council. The Oriental church instead adheres to the doctrine defined by Cyril of Alexandria, considered as a saint by the Chalcedonian churches as well, who described Christ as being of one incarnate nature, where both divine and human nature are united. To distinguish this from Eutychian and other versions of Monophysitism this position is called miaphysitism.

Oriental Orthodoxy developed in reaction to Chalcedon on the eastern limit of the Byzantine Empire and in Egypt and Syria. In those locations, there are now also Eastern Orthodox Patriarchs, but the rivalry between the Eastern Orthodox and the Oriental Orthodox has largely vanished in the centuries since schism. In recent times, both Chalcedonian and anti-Chalcedonian churches have developed a deeper understanding for each other's positions, recognizing the substantial agreement while maintaining their respective theological language. Hence, the Monophysite label is avoided when describing the Armenians' or Copts' belief regarding the Nature of Christ.

== Ecumenism between Eastern Orthodoxy and Oriental Orthodoxy ==
Both the Eastern Orthodox and Oriental Orthodox churches formally believe themselves to be the continuation of the true church and the other to have fallen into schism, although in the past 20 years much work had been done toward ecumenism or reconciliation between the Oriental and Eastern Orthodox churches. There has been an attempt to achieve ecumenism between the Antiochian and Oriental Orthodox churches. At Chambesy in Switzerland, plenary talks were held resulting in agreements in 1989, 1990 and 1993. All the official representatives of the Eastern Orthodox and the Oriental Orthodox reached agreement in these dialogues that the Christological differences between the two communions are more a matter of emphasis than of substance. Although elements in a number of the Eastern Orthodox churches have criticized the apparent consensus reached by the representatives at Chambesy, the patriarch and holy synod of the Antiochian Orthodox Church welcomed the agreements as positive moves towards a sharing in the Love of God, and a rejection of the hatred of insubstantial division. As recommended in the Second Chambesy Agreement of 1990, the Antiochian (Eastern) Orthodox Patriarch Ignatius IV formally met with the Syriac (Oriental) Orthodox Patriarch, Ignatius Zakka I, on July 22, 1991. At that meeting, the two patriarchs signed a pastoral agreement which called for "complete and mutual respect between the two churches." It also prohibited the passing of faithful from one church to the other, envisaged joint meetings of the two holy synods when appropriate, and provided for future guidelines for inter-communion of the faithful and Eucharistic concelebration by the clergy of the two churches. The Church of Antioch expects these guidelines to be issued when the faithful of both churches are ready, but not before. Patriarch Ignatius has also overseen participation in a bilateral commission with the Melkite Greek Catholic Church, which is exploring ways of healing the 18th century schism between the Melkite Catholics and the Antiochian Orthodox. In an unprecedented event, Melkite Patriarch Maximos V addressed a meeting of the Orthodox holy synod in October 1996. The members of the holy synod of Antioch continue to explore greater communication and more friendly meetings with their Syriac, Melkite, and Maronite brothers and sisters, who all share a common heritage.

The following Oriental Orthodox churches are autocephalous and in full communion:

- Egyptian Coptic Orthodox Church
- Armenian Apostolic Church
- Eritrean Orthodox Tewahdo Church
- Ethiopian Orthodox Tewahedo Church
- Indian Orthodox Church
- Syriac Orthodox Church

== See also ==
- History of Christianity
- History of the Eastern Orthodox Church
- History of the Russian Orthodox Church
- Timeline of Orthodoxy in Greece
- Timeline of Eastern Orthodoxy in America

== Bibliography ==
- The Spirituality of the Christian East: A systematic handbook by Tomas Spidlik, Cistercian Publications Inc Kalamazoo Michigan 1986 ISBN 0-87907-879-0

== Filmography ==
- 'The last Assyrians', a history of Aramaic speaking Christians. Documentary film
