= Chudov Monastery =

Old monastery in the Moscow Kremlin

Coordinates: 55°45′8″N 37°37′8″E

- Чудов монастырь
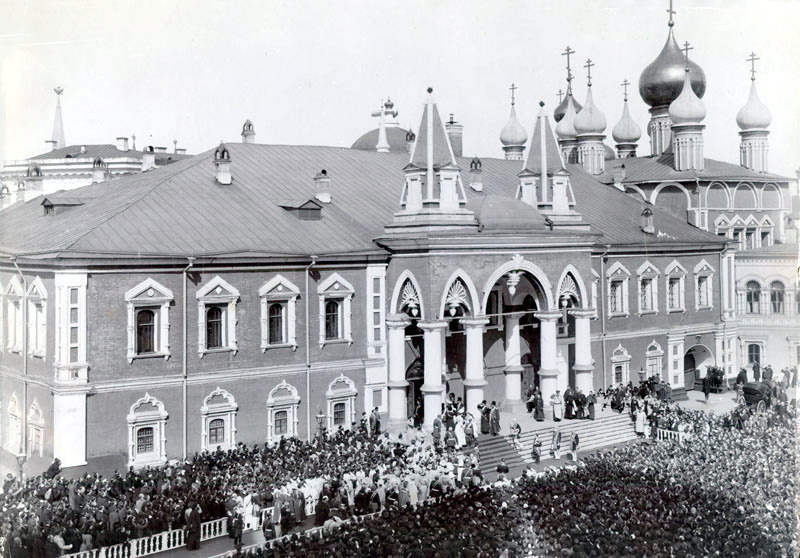
- Coronation of Nicholas II and Alexandra Feodorovna in 1896
- Interactive map of Chudov Monastery

Monastery information
- Established: 1365
- Disestablished: 1929
- Dedication: Wonder of Archangel Michael in Chonae
- Controlled churches: St. Alexius church, Archangel Michael church

People
- Founder: Alexius, Metropolitan of Moscow
- Important associated figures: Alexius, False Dmitry I, Patriarch Hermogenes of Moscow, Maximus the Greek

Architecture
- Status: Demolished

The Chudov Monastery (Russian: Чу́дов монасты́рь, romanized: Chúdov monastýr'; more formally known as Alexius’ Archangel Michael Monastery) was founded in the Moscow Kremlin in 1358 by Metropolitan Alexius of Moscow. The monastery was dedicated to the miracle (chudo in Russian) of the Archangel Michael at Chonae (feast day: September 19 [O.S. September 6]). The Monastery was closed in 1918 and dismantled in 1929 by the Soviet government.

== History ==
The construction of the monastery together with its katholikon (cathedral) was finished in 1365. The katholikon was replaced with a new one in 1431 and then once again in 1501–1503. It was traditionally used for baptising the royal children, including future Tsars Feodor I, Aleksey I and Peter the Great. The monastery's hegumen (abbot) was considered the first among the hegumens of all the Russian monasteries until 1561.

Alongside Simonov Monastery and Trinity–St. Sergius Lavra, the Chudov Monastery was the biggest center of the Muscovite book culture and learning. Prominent monks of the monastery, who dedicated their lives to translating and correcting ecclesiastic books, include Maximus the Greek, Yepifany Slavinetsky and Karion Istomin. Gennady, who as Archbishop of Novgorod, patronized the first complete codex of the Bible in Slavic in 1499, was hegumen of the monastery prior to his archiepiscopate.

Patriarch Hermogenes was starved to death by the Poles in the monastery vaults in 1612. The Time of Troubles over, they opened the Greek-Latin School with support from Patriarch Filaret. In 1744–1833, the cloister accommodated the Moscow Ecclesiastic Consistory. As time went by, new churches were added to the monastery complex. These included the Church of St Alexius the Metropolitan and the Church of the Annunciation (both built in 1680) and the Church of Saint Andrew (1887).

During the French invasion of Russia (1812), the French Marshal Louis-Nicolas Davout commandeered the monastery for his own use. A painting by Vasily Vereshchagin shows Davout desecrating the cathedral, using the sanctuary itself as his office. Following the Bolshevik Revolution, the Chudov Monastery was closed down in 1918. All of its structures demolished in 1929, as part of the Soviet Union's ongoing policy of state atheism.

On the site of the destroyed Chudov Monastery and the nearby Ascension Convent the Soviet government built the Red Commanders School. All of the monastery's manuscripts of the 11th-18th centuries were transferred to the State Historical Museum. The relics of Metropolitan Alexius were first moved from the Church of St. Alexius (which he had built) to the Cathedral of the Dormition and then to another church in Moscow. Of the hundred or so other interments in the monastery (including Archbishop Gennady), their remains were lost and their whereabouts are still unknown.

A scene in Mussorgsky's opera Boris Godunov is set at the monastery.

In 2007 Orthodox public figure Vitaly Vladimirovich Averyanov in an interview with the Youth Internet Journal of the Moscow State University, Tatiana Day, explained the possible restoration of the Chudov Monastery and the Passion Monastery.

On 31 July 2014, president Vladimir Putin suggested restoring the Chudov Monastery and the Ascension Convent: "As you know, the building that occupies this site [Building 14] was built in the 1930s, but previously there were two cloisters and a church here... That is how the idea came up of rather than restoring the 1930s building, returning the site to its historical appearance instead, with the two cloisters and the church. In today's situation of course, they would be restored as cultural heritage monuments only." However, no plans exist to restore the monasteries as of 2026.

== Burials ==
- Gennady of Novgorod
- Alexius, Metropolitan of Moscow
- Patriarch Hermogenes (since 1913 in the Assumption cathedral)
- Grand Duke Sergei Alexandrovich Romanov
- Boris Kurakin
