= Gennady of Novgorod =

Eastern Orthodox Saint & Archbishop of Novgorod and Pskov from 1484 to 1504

Saint Gennadius of Novgorod
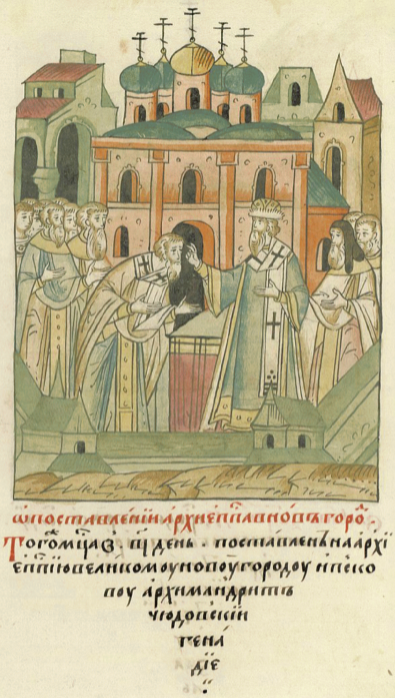
- Consecration of Gennady as a Bishop of Novgorod.

Venerable
- Born: presumably Moscow
- Died: 4 December 1505; Chudov Monastery
- Venerated in: Eastern Orthodox Church
- Canonized: 2016 by Russian Orthodox Church
- Feast: 4 December
- Attributes: Gennady's Bible

Gennadius (Gennady, Russian: Геннадий; died 4 December 1505) was Archbishop of Novgorod the Great and Pskov from 1484 to 1504.

He was most instrumental in fighting the Heresy of the Judaizers and is famous for compiling the first complete codex of the Bible in Slavic in 1499, known as the Gennady Bible. Gennady is a saint of the Russian Orthodox Church. His feast day is 4 December OS/17 December in the Gregorian Calendar.

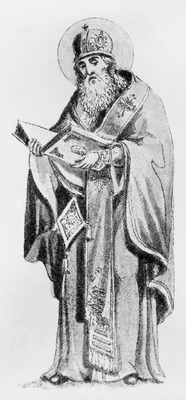
Gennady (Archbishop of Novgorod)

== Biography ==
Gennady was from the Gonzov boyar clan of Moscow and was, prior to his archiepiscopate, hegumen of the Chudov Monastery in the Moscow Kremlin. His immediate predecessor in Novgorod, Sergei, served less than a year. Sergei was recalled and confined to the Chudov Monastery apparently due to mental illness.

Gennady was named Archbishop of Novgorod in Moscow and placed in office on 12 December 1484, the first Novgorodian prelate not chosen by lots since 1359. He arrived in Novgorod in January 1485 with the task (as had been Sergei's) of bringing the newly conquered Novgorodian church (the city had been brought under direct Muscovite control only in 1478 and the last locally elected archbishop, Feofil, had been removed only in 1480) more in line with Muscovite ecclesiastical practices. He faced opposition from the local clergy by his commemoration of several Muscovite saints, but dealt with this opposition by including several local saints in his commemoration.

Gennady's main difficulty during his archiepiscopate, however, was rooting out the Judaizer heresy from Novgorod and also Moscow, where it had spread when several Novgorodian clergymen were transferred to the capital. He is said to have borrowed methods from the Spanish Inquisition, admiring how the King of Spain had dealt with heterodoxy in his kingdom, and he burned several heretics with the support of the grand prince and metropolitan.

The Novgorodian Fourth Chronicle notes that Gennady also helped pay for one third of the reconstruction of the current Detinets or Kremlin walls between 1484 and 1490, and in 1492, he calculated Easter for the next thousand years. Many Russians believed the year 7000 from the creation of the world (according to the Byzantine Calendar) would be the end of the world (this corresponds to the year 1492 AD) and thus they did not calculate Easter after that. This would have had dire consequences, not only for the performance of religious rituals, but also in determining when to plant and harvest crops, and could potentially have led to famine. Gennady's contribution thus went beyond merely knowing when Easter was.

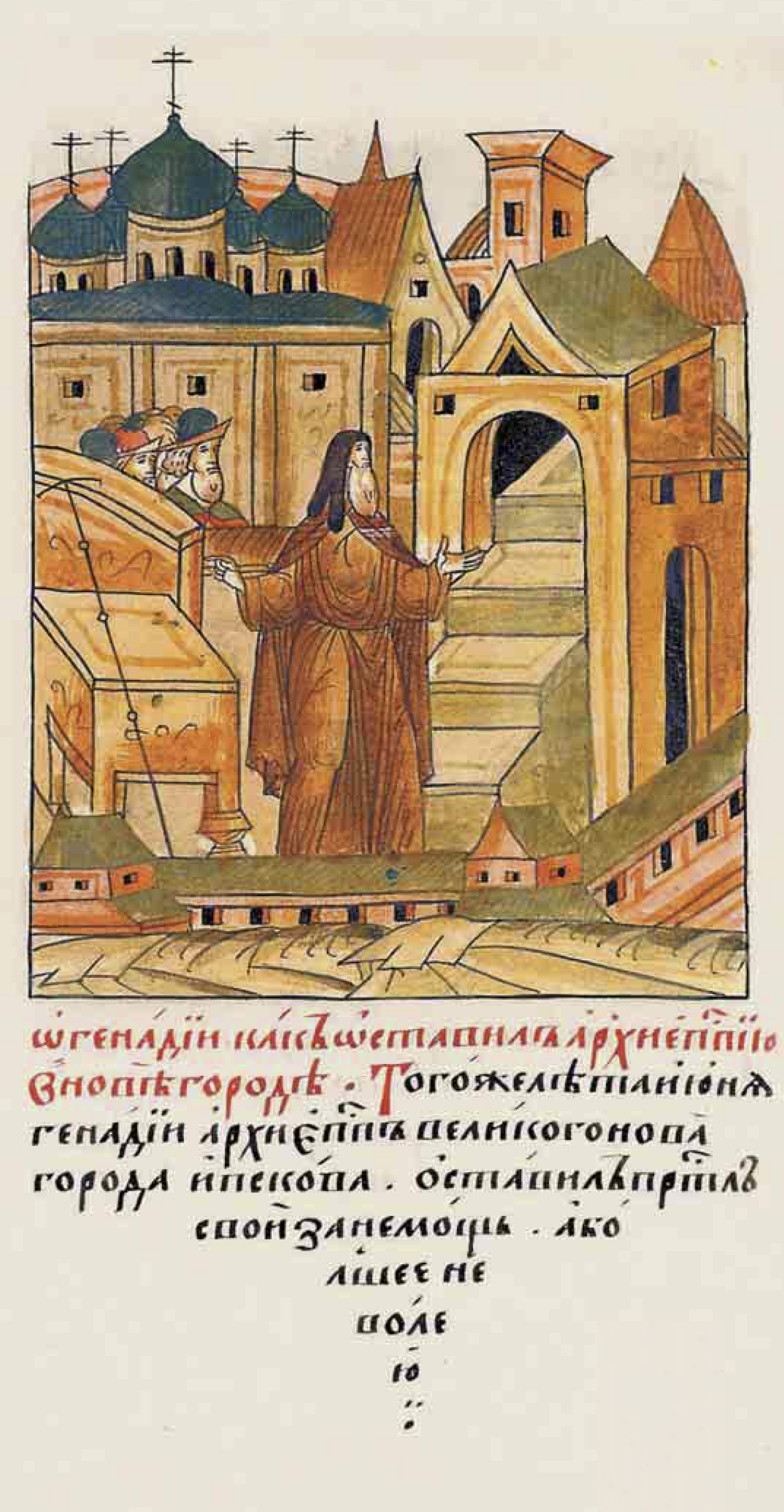
The page from the Illustrated Chronicle of Ivan the Terrible describing Gennady's retirement from the office

== Death and burial ==
Gennady took part in the Moscow Council of 1503, but the following year he was accused of simony and retired from office. After returning to Moscow, he died on 4 December 1505 in the Chudov Monastery. He was buried near Metropolitan Aleksei in the main church of the monastery until its destruction in 1929, after which his remains were lost, as were those of more than a hundred other people buried in the Kremlin.

Preceded by Sergei	Archbishop of Novgorod; 1484–1504	Succeeded by Serapion I
