= Gennady's Bible =

1499 manuscript of the Bible in Church Slavonic

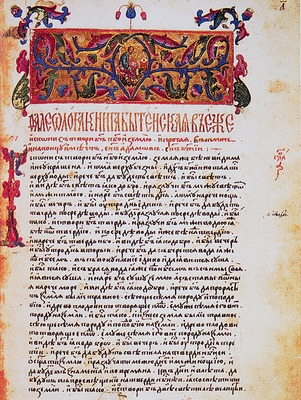
The first page of the Book of Genesis

Gennady's Bible (Russian: Геннадиевская Библия, romanized: Genadiyevskaya Bibliya) is the first full manuscript translation of the Bible into Church Slavonic, completed in 1499. It is in the collection of the State Historical Museum in Moscow.

Gennady (r. 1484–1504), the archbishop of Novgorod the Great and Pskov, set the task to collect all Biblical translations, partly in response to the emergence of a religious sect known in Russia as the Judaizers that confronted the Russian Orthodox Church. Before him, there were only separate and incomplete Slavonic translations of various books and chapters. Gennady's Bible included a number of books wholly or partially translated from the Latin Vulgate. The collection marked the "first serious victory of Western scholasticism on Russian soil".

Gennady and his assistants used the Pentateuch, Judges, Joshua, Ruth, Kings, Job, Zephaniah, Haggai, Zechariah, Malachi, Proverbs, Ecclesiastes, the Gospels, Acts, Epistles, Revelation, Psalms and others. He translated missing books with the help of the monk Veniamin from the Vulgate, including the Nehemiah, Ezra, Tobit, Judith, Esther, Jeremiah, Wisdom, 1 Maccabees, 2 Maccabees, 1 Esdras, 2 Esdras and others.

Gennady's Bible was also the main source of the Ostrog Bible. Russian tsar Ivan IV requested copies from Ivan Fyodorov.

== See also ==
- Bible translations into Church Slavonic

== Sources ==
- "Библейские переводы" . Brockhaus and Efron Encyclopedic Dictionary (in Russian). 1906.
- Romodanovskaya, V. A. "Геннадиевская Библия" [Gennady's Bible]. Православная энциклопедия [Orthodox Encyclopedia] (in Russian). pp. 584–588.
