= Epiphanius Slavinetsky =

Epifany Slavinetsky (Russian: Епифа́ний Славине́цкий) (c. 1600 – 19 November 1675) was an ecclesiastical expert of the Russian Orthodox Church who helped Patriarch Nikon to revise ancient service-books. His actions precipitated the raskol, the great schism of the national church.

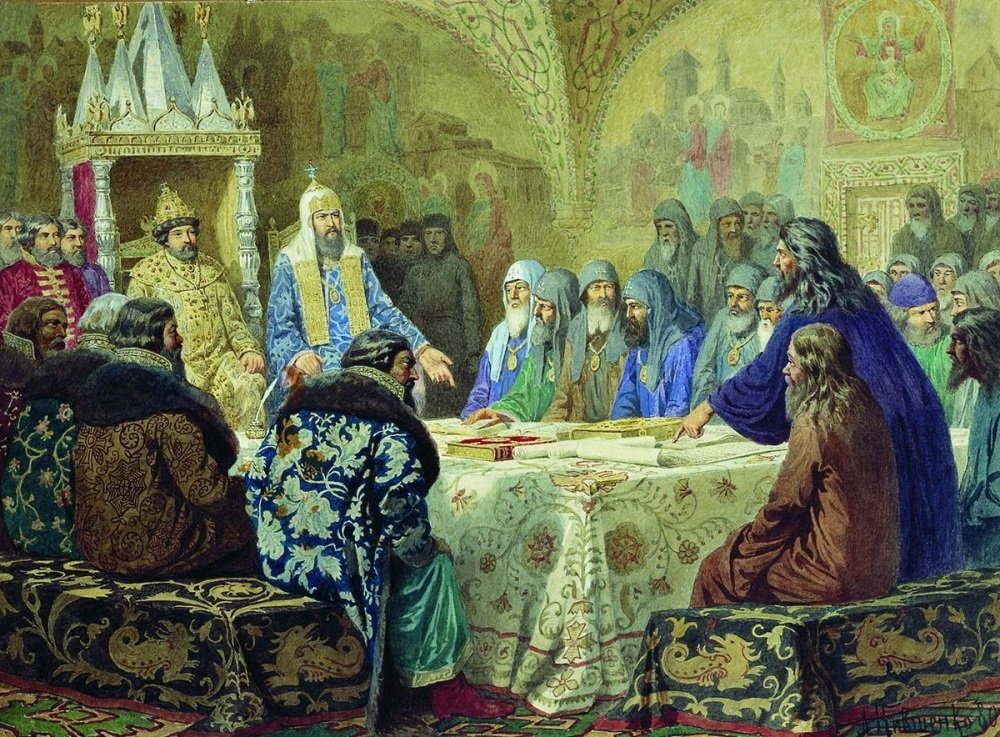
Epifany Slavinetsky revising the service-books. Painting by Aleksey Kivshenko.

Epifany was born in Moscow. In the 1620s, he attended the Kiev Brotherhood School and furthered his education abroad. He was one of the most educated people of his period in Central and Eastern Europe. He came to master Latin, Polish, Ancient Greek and Hebrew. On his return to Kiev, he took monastic vows in the Kiev Pechersk Lavra. In the late 1630s, he compiled the first Latin-Church Slavonic lexicon, which he would revise on several occasions.

Upon hearing about Epifany's scholarly expertise, the Imperial Russian Tsar Alexis invited him to correct the ecclesiastical books of Muscovy. Epifany arrived in Moscow in 1649 and visited the Trinity-Sergius monastery the same year. He quickly managed to secure the patronage of the Boyar Boris Morozov and Metropolitan Nikon of Novgorod, who was elected Patriarch a short time later.

Epifany joined the Chudov Monastery in the Moscow Kremlin where he was appointed head of the Patriarchal school and charged with administrating the Printery. He revived the mediaeval tradition of delivering sermons in Russian churches. In the 1650s and early 1660s, he revised the Muscovite service-books and translated Erasmus and Copernicus from Latin. He translated Joannes Löwenklaw's collection of Byzantine law in 1656.

When Nikon fell into disgrace, he gained the support of the scholar, who proved that his deposition was contrary to the laws of the church. He spent his last years translating the Septuagint and the New Testament as commissioned by his patron Fyodor Rtishchev. Epifany died in Moscow in 1675.
