= Of Novgorod =

Toponymic epithet

Of Novgorod is a toponymic epithet associated with the Principality of Novgorod or the city of Veliky Novgorod. Notable people with this epithet include:

== Rulers and other nobility ==
- Anna of Novgorod
- Ingeborg of Novgorod
- Narimantas of Novgorod
- Oleg of Novgorod
- Rurik of Novgorod
- Vadim of Novgorod
- Viacheslava of Novgorod
- Vladimir of Novgorod
- Vsevolod Mstislavich of Novgorod and Pskov
- Vysheslav of Novgorod

== Clergy ==
- Anthony of Novgorod
- Euthymius II of Novgorod,Archbishop of Novgorod from 1429 to 1458
- Gennady of Novgorod ( died 1505), Archbishop of Novgorod the Great and Pskov from 1484 to 1504
- Lev of Novgorod
- Luke of Novgorod
- Nicetas of Novgorod
- Niphont of Novgorod
- Serapion of Novgorod

== Other ==
- Anthemius of Novgorod
- Stephen of Novgorod

== See also ==
- Prince of Novgorod
- List of bishops and archbishops of Novgorod
