= List of bishops and archbishops of Novgorod =

This is a list of the bishops and archbishops of Novgorod the Great from the Christianization of Rus' in 988 to the establishment of the Metropolitanate in Novgorod in 1589.

Bishops of Novgorod 989–1163

- Ioakim Korsunianin (c. 989–1030)
- Efrem (1030–1035) – never consecrated
- Luka Zhidiata (1035–1060)
- Stefan (1060–1068)
- Fedor (1069–1077)
- German (1078–1095)
- Nikita (1096–1108)
- Ioann Pop'ian (1110–1130) (d. 1144)
- Nifont (1130–1156) – held archiepiscopal title personally
- Arkady (1156–1163)

Archbishops of Novgorod the Great and Pskov 1165–1589

- Ilya (Ioann) (1165–1186)
- Gavril (Grigory) (1186–1193)
- Martiry Rushanin (1193–1199) –only a bishop
- Mitrofan (1199–1211, 1219–1223)
- Antony (1211–1219, 1226–28, 1229)
- Arseny (1223–1225, 1228–1229) – never consecrated
- Spiridon (1229–1249)
- Dalmat (1249–1274)
- Kliment (1274–1299)
- Feoktist (1299–1308) (d. 1310)
- David (1309–1325)
- Moisei (1325–1330, 1352–1359) (d. 1363)
- Vasilii Kalika (1331–1352)
- Aleksei (1359–1388) (d. 1390)
- Ioann (1388–1415) (d. 1417)
- Simeon (1415–1421)
- Feodosy (1421–1423) (d. 1425)–never consecrated
- Evfimy I (1423–1429)
- Evfimy II (1429–+03/20/1458)
- Iona (1458–11/05/1470)
- Feofil (1470–1480) (d. 1482/84?)
- Sergei (1483–1484) (d.1504)
- Gennady (1484–1504) (d. 1505)
- Serapion (1506–1509) (d. 1516)

1509–1526 Vacancy

- Makary (1526–1542) became Metropolitan of Moscow (d. 1563)
- Feodosii (1542–1551)
- Serapion II (1551–1552)
- Pimen (1552–1571)
- Leonid (1571–1575)
- Aleksandr (1576–1591) – elevated to Metropolitan dignity, 1589
