= Novgorod cross =

Christian cross variation

Novgorod Cross

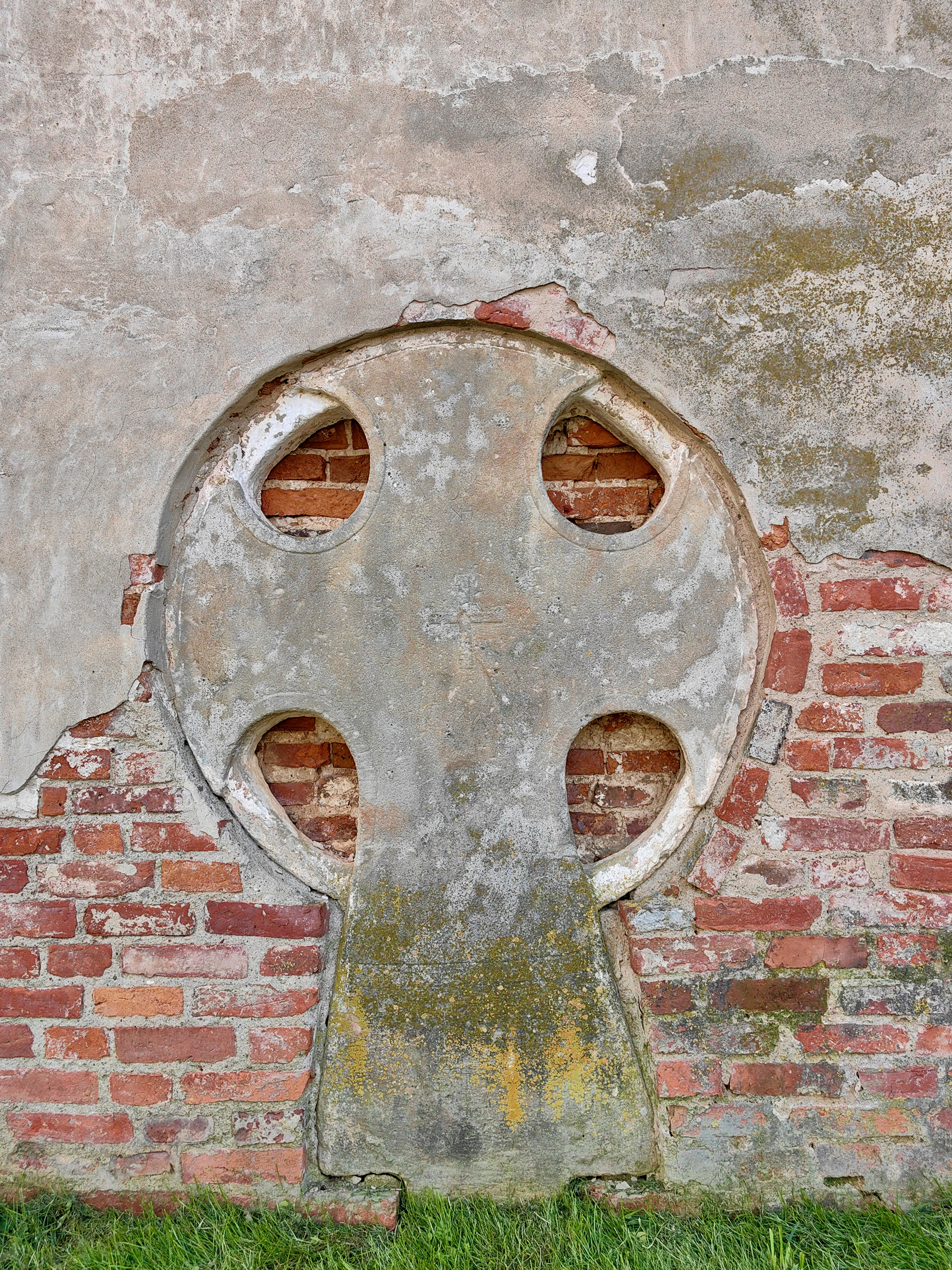
Novgorod cross on the wall of the bell tower of the Znamensky Monastery in Veliky Novgorod

The Novgorod cross is a type of cross which combines two geometric shapes - cross and circle. It is sometimes considered a variation of the Cross pattée. Often the ends of the cross are completely inscribed in a circle. It is visually similar to the Celtic cross but originated in Eastern Europe rather than the British Isles

== Features ==
This form of cross was common in Novgorod land. In the process of development, by the 15th century, the form of Novgorod crosses changes to a form of "round cross", resembling not so much a cross as a disc with four slits. In other lands and among other traditions this form of cross is rarely used.

There is a variety that combines a circle and a cross, the ends of which, projecting beyond the circle, also have cross-shaped ends.

== Alexievsky cross ==
One of the most famous crosses belonging to the Novgorod type is Alexius' cross of the XIV century - a stone, inlay, bowed cross, erected by Archbishop of Novgorod Alexius (hence its name) on the western wall of the Sophia Cathedral in Novgorod. Presumably dates from the time after 1380 and is considered a monument in honor of Kulikovo Battle.

== See also ==
- Alexievsky cross

== Sources ==
- «Новгородский крест в круге — самый красивый крест в мире». Град Петров. Программа Марины Лобановой «Встреча». Гости: Татьяна Хмельник и Александр Потравнов. Тема: древние каменные кресты Северо-Запада России.
