= Ontsifor Lukinich =

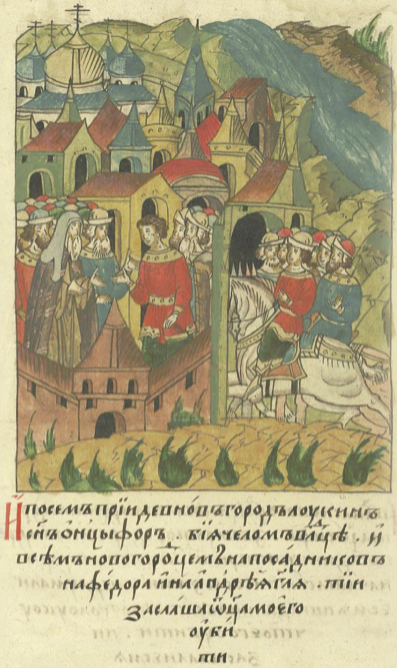
Ontsifor Lukich returns to Novgorod from a campaign, 1568

Ontsifor Lukinich (Russian: Онцифор Лукинич; died 1367) was a posadnik of Novgorod the Great in 1350–1354. He came from a Novgorodian boyar family that gave a number of posadniks to the city. He is most famous for reforming the office in 1359, increasing the number of posadniks and creating a ruling collective in the city.

== Life ==
Ontsifor was active politically from 1342, when he first appears in Russian chronicles. That year, he led a war party out to the Volga River at the same time his father, Luka Varfolomeyev led troops into the Dvina Land, where Luka was killed (in the "Land Beyond the Portages," the unorganized part of the Novgorod Republic). Upon hearing this, the "common people" (chernye liudi, literally "the black people") in Novgorod (perhaps a faction loyal to Luka and Ontsifor) rose up against two men, Ondreshko and Posadnik Fedor Danilov, accusing them of masterminding Luka's murder. Ondreshko and Danilov subsequently fled to Koporye where they remained the winter.

Ontsifor then appealed to the Archbishop of Novgorod, which at the time would have been Vasilii Kalika, who in concert with the boyars sent an archimandrite and boyars to Koporye to bring Ondreshko and Danilov back to Novgorod. Back in Novgorod, the two men denied masterminding the killing, and Ontsifor convened a "Vladychnoe veche" ("a bishop's veche") in front of the Cathedral of Holy Wisdom while Ondreshko and Fedor convened another veche at Yaroslav's Courtyard on the Marketplace across the Volkhov from the cathedral.

In the morning, Ontsifor sent Vasilii across the river to negotiate with Ondreshko and Fedor but did not wait for his return before he and the veche in front of the cathedral took up arms and crossed the bridge to attack the veche on the Market Side, seizing two men (but not Ondreshko and Fedor) and confining them in a church (the chronicle does not say which one - it could have been the cathedral or one of the churches on the market) before Ontsifor broke down and fled the city. Vasilii and his vicar (namestnik), Boris, managed to bring calm to the city later that afternoon.

Ontsifor appears to have not stayed away from the city long and reappears in the chronicle again in 1348 leading Novgorodian troops (he was one of several commanders mentioned) against the Swedish king Magnus Eriksson, who was at that time crusading against the Finnic Izhera people living along the Neva River and threatening the fortress of Orekhov. Ontsifor and the other companions managed to retake the region and kill 500 of the enemy, losing only 3 themselves before returning to Novgorod. (Magnus, however, took the fortress later that same year).

Ontsifor was first elected posadnik in 1350, when the Novgorod First Chronicle notes that they took the posadnikship away from Fedor Danilovich, whom Ontsifor had accused of murdering his father nine years earlier, and gave it to Ontsifor. Valentin Yanin argues that he was not posadnik of All Novgorod, but was posadnik only of the Nerev End (Konets) north of the Novgorod Detinets (Kremlin). He and was reelected every year until 1354. The chronicle mentions that in 1354, he voluntarily gave up the office of posadnik. He died in 1367.

== Legacy ==
Ontsifor is most famous for implementing a series of reforms in the posadnichestvo (the office of posadnik) in 1359, greatly expanding the number of posadniks (essentially the retired posadniks maintained influence while the current, sitting posadnik, became staryi or senior posadnik). Valentin Yanin called it a "collective posadnichestvo" after the reforms.

At least two Ontsiforovichi ("sons of Ontsifor") are mentioned in the chronicles carrying out political duties in the 1370s into the early 15th century: Maksim and Yuri (his death is mentioned in 1417). These are probably Ontsifor's son, although the chronicler never conclusively says so and it is possible that they are the sons of a different man of the same name. That the chronicler mentions them without explaining who they are seems to suggest however, that they are the sons of this, rather famous Ontsifor.

Ontsifor's residence in the Nerev End (borough) was discovered during archaeological digs in the city and was excavated between 1951 and 1962. Several birch bark documents have been found that are from or are addressed to him, including one he sent to his mother.
