= Anthony of Novgorod =

Archbishop of Novgorod (1210–1218, 1125/1226–1228)

Saint Anthony
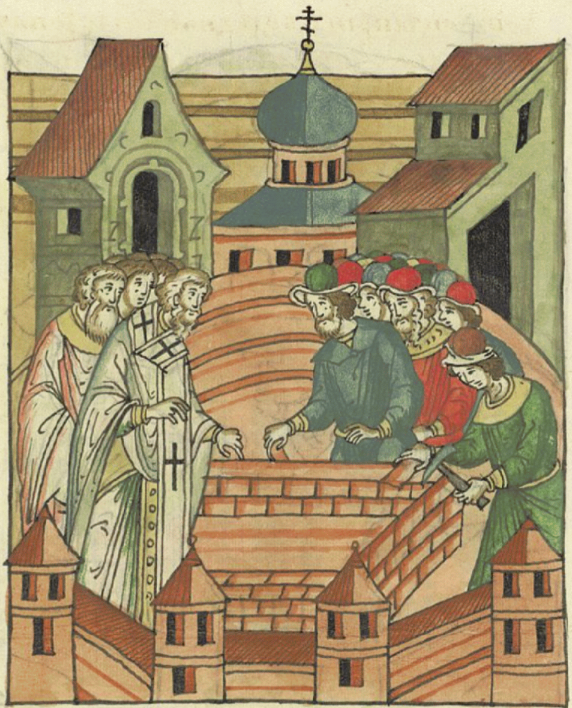
- Anthony lays the foundation of a church in Novgorod, miniature from the Illustrated Chronicle of Ivan the Terrible (16th century)

The Venerable Archbishop of Novgorod
- Born: Novgorod
- Died: 8 October 1232; Novgorod
- Venerated in: Russian Orthodox Church
- Canonized: 1439
- Feast: 8 October; 10 February (Synaxis)

Anthony (Russian: Антоний, romanized: Antony; secular name: Dobryna Yadreykovich; Russian: Добрыня Ядрейкович; died 8 October 1232) was the archbishop of Novgorod (1210–1218, 1125/1226–1228). He is venerated as a saint in the Russian Orthodox Church.

== Life ==
Born Dobryna Yadreykovich to a wealthy family in Novgorod, around 1190 he joined the monastery of Khutyn. His father, Yadrey, was a governor of Novgorod who died in 1194 during a campaign against Yugra. In 1200, he undertook a pilgrimage to Constantinople and wrote an account of his journey in his Pilgrim's Book, which is of interest to historians for its description of the city and its religious monuments.

After the archbishop of Novgorod was banished in 1210, Anthony temporarily ascended to the role, but returned the see when his predecessor was permitted to return. Anthony again became the archbishop in 1225/1226, then remained in the position until retiring in 1228 for health reasons. He died on 8 October 1232, after a disease had rendered him mute.

Around 1220, when Galicia was ruled by Mstislav Mstislavich, Anthony may have been a bishop of Przemyśl, according to some Russian sources.

== Veneration ==
Anthony was canonized as a local saint in 1439. Archbishop Euthymius II of Novgorod established a feast day on 10 February for the princes and saints of Novgorod. This was confirmed by the inclusion of his name in the Synaxis of Novgorod Saints dating to the 17th–18th centuries.
