= Vyazhishchi Monastery =

Orthodox convent in Vyazhishchi, Novgorod Oblast, Russia

Coordinates: 58°37′23″N 31°10′00″E

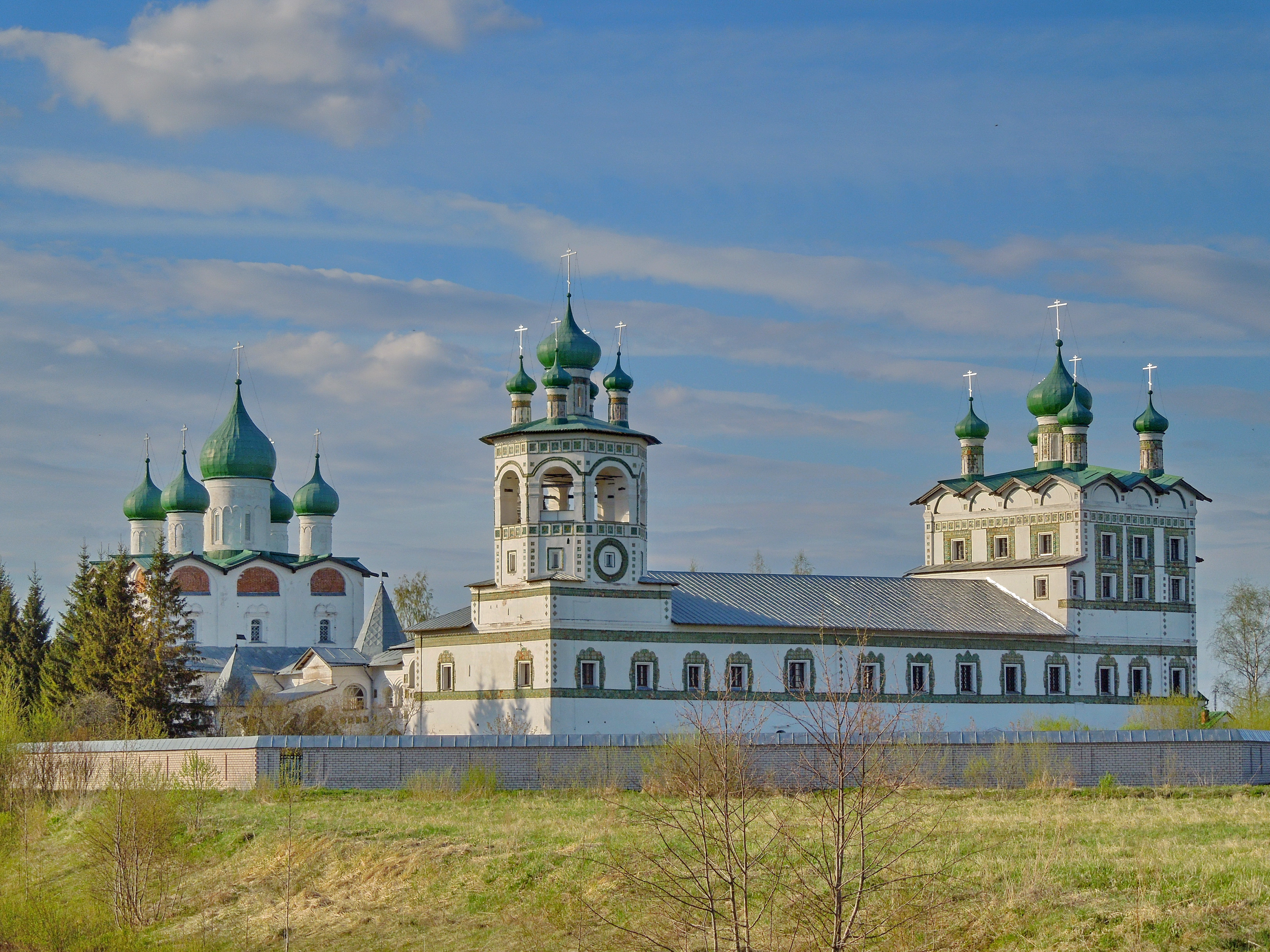

The Vyazhishchi Convent of St. Nicholas (Nikolo-Vyazhishchsky Stavropegial Women's Monastery; Russian: Николо-Вяжищский ставропигиальный монастырь) is an Orthodox convent located in the village of Vyazhishchi, 7 miles (12 km) NNW of Veliky Novgorod. Its surviving buildings date from the period between 1681 and 1708. They are famous for having the richest maiolica decorations in Northwest Russia.

The monastery was founded by the monks Efrosiny, Ignaty, and Galaktion and the hieromonk Pimen at the end of the fourteenth century (a charter from 1391 mentions it), with Pimen becoming the first hegumen of the monastery. It was first mentioned in the chronicle in the year 1411. The monastery was patronized by Archbishop Evfimy II (r. 1429–1458), who was hegumen of the monastery before his election as archbishop of Novgorod in 1429, and was buried there (he is known as St. Evfimy of Vyazhishche). His sarcophagus is now in the Church of St. Evfimy of Vyazhishche, built in 1685.

The monastery was one of the greatest landowners in the Novgorodian land, holding in the 15th and 16th centuries some 2,000 hectares of land. Much of its lands were confiscated during Catherine II's secularisation reform (1764) at which time it was classified as a 2nd Class Monastery.

Following confiscation by the Soviets, the monastery was closed in 1920. It became part of a collective farm and the buildings were used to store potatoes, as well as a threshing floor, a forge, and a metal shop. From the 1950s, there were efforts to restore the monastery and it was returned to the Russian Orthodox Church in 1989. On March 31, 1990, then Metropolitan of Leningrad and Novgorod Alexius (later the Patriarch of Moscow) reconsecrated the main church to St. Evfimy.

The convent has the status of a stauropegic monastery (as of a grant from the Holy Synod of 7 October 1995), that is, it is under the direct control of the Patriarch of Moscow rather than of the Archbishop of Novgorod. At the turn of the 21st century, 15 nuns lived at the monastery. It has two churches with altars dedicated to St. Evfimy, St. Nicholas, St. John the Divine, and to the feast of the Ascension. The churches were meticulously restored in the early 21st century under the supervision of Leonid Krasnorechyev and Ninel Kuzmina.

17th-century maiolica tiles decorating the church walls

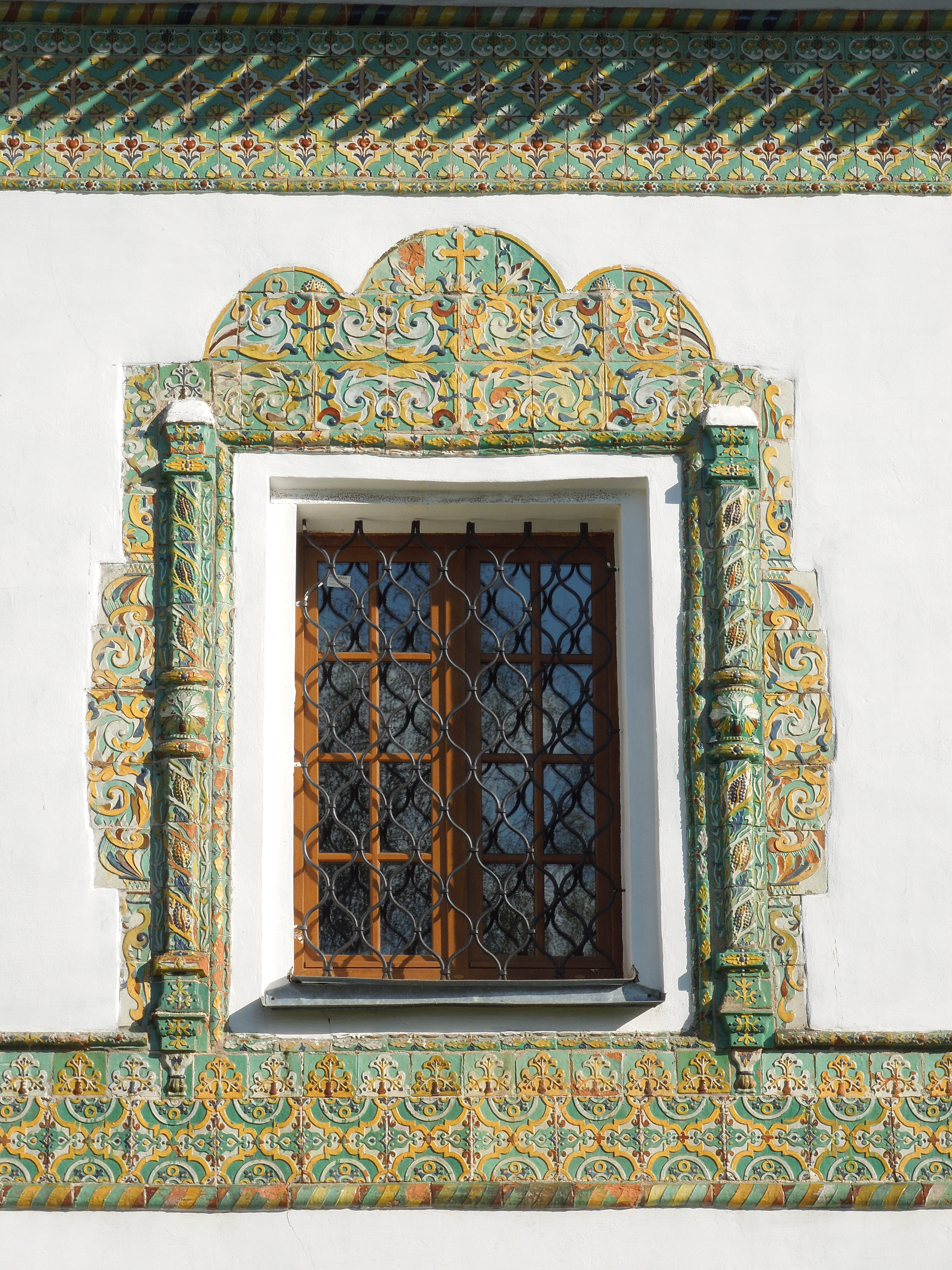

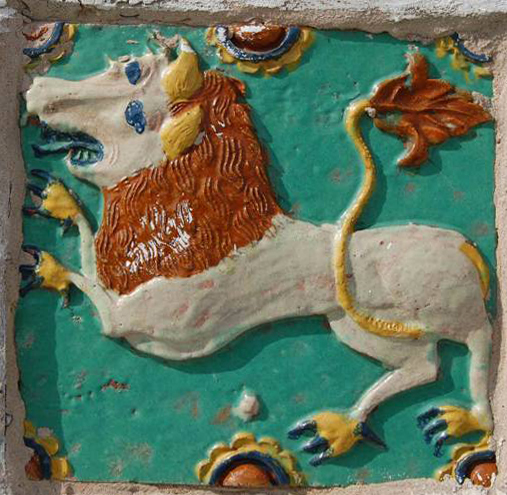

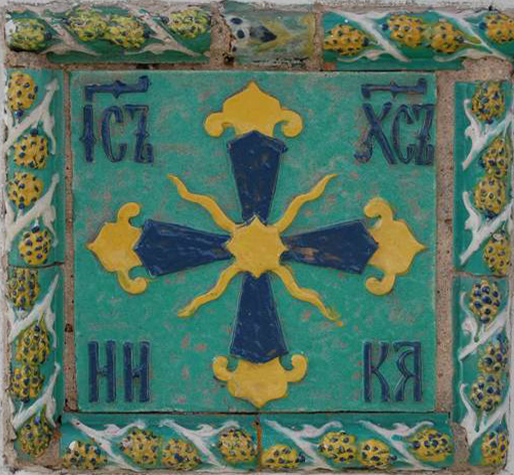

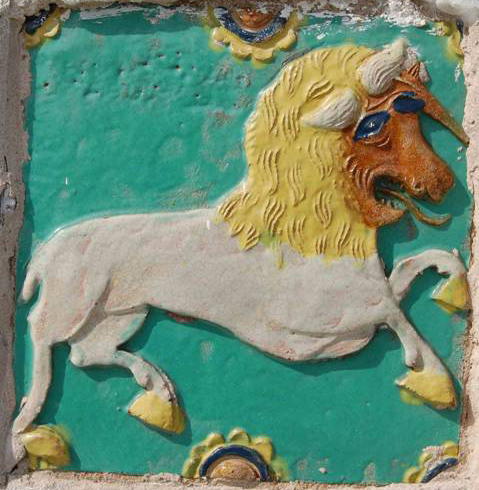

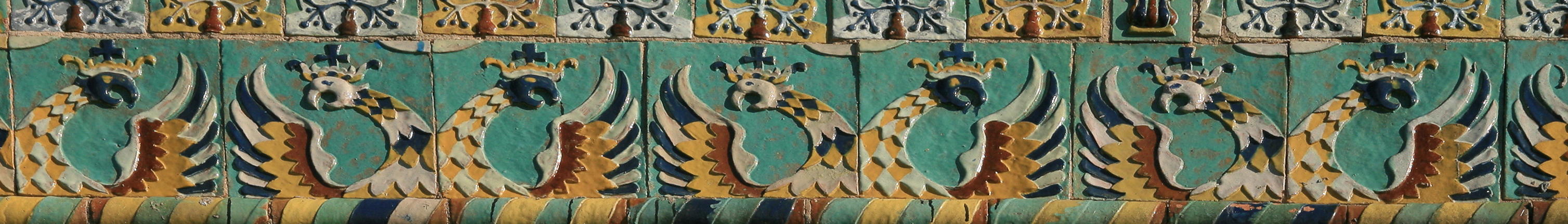
