= Alexievsky cross =

Russian cross monument

- Алексиевский крест
- Interactive map of Alexievsky cross

The Alexievsky Cross is a fourteenth century inlaid stone wayside cross installed on the western wall of the Sophia Cathedral in Weliky Novgorod. It is named for Archbishop Alexei of Novgorod, who originally commissioned it.

== Description ==
The cross was initially placed in a special niche on the western side of the cathedral, to the right of the Magdeburg Gates. It was carved out of limestone and is 174 centimetres (69 in) high, and has four points with widening ends. The shape of the Alexius cross is traditional for Novgorod crosses of the fourteenth century. The branches are decorated with reliefs depicting Gospel scenes: at the top, the Annunciation of the Blessed Virgin Mary; on the left, The Birth of Christ; on the right, the Descent of Christ into Hell; and at the bottom, the Ascension of the Lord. The outer edge is inscribed with a prayer and the name of the archbishop:

[In the summer...] this cross was painted in Novgorod, in Shchagol, by order of the God-loving Most Reverend Archbishop Oleksiy and placed for veneration by the faithful Christian. Archbishop Oleksiy, may God grant many years, and health, and salvation to his children, and to the whole world."

(This is T. V. Nikolayeva's transcription of the inscription, including the interpretation of "Shchagola" as a modified name of Choglova Ulitsa in Novgorod.)

== History ==
There are various assumptions about the age and purpose of the cross. The first mention of it is in the 1858 inventory of the St. Sophia Cathedral, compiled by protoiereus Pyotr Solovyov. Archimandrite Macarius (Mirolyubov) linked the creation of the cross to the internecine conflict in Novgorod in 1359. V. V. Stasov dated it to the period of archbishop Alexy's tenure on the cathedra (12 July 1360 - April 1388). epigraphic, stylistic, and iconographic observations allowed T.V. Nikolayeva to date the cross to a time after 1380 and consider it a monument in honor of the Battle of Kulikovo.

The lower part of the cross was lost during World War II and reconstructed in gypsum in the 1950s-1960s. Currently, the cross is located inside the Cathedral of St. Sophia to the left of the central (Assumption) iconostasis.

== Literature (in Russian) ==
- Описание новгородского Софийского собора, составленное протоиереем Петром Соловьёвым с четырьми рисунками акад. Ф. Солнцева и летописным указателем П. Савваитова. — СПб., 1858. — С. 64–65.
- Макарий [Миролюбов], архим. Археологическое описание церковных древностей Новгорода и его окрестностей. — М., 1860. — Ч. 1. — С. 52–53.
- Стасов В. В. Каменный крест Новгородского Софийского собора // Изв. РАО. — СПб., 1861. — Т. 3. — Вып. 5. — Стб. 423–427. Табл. 3.
- Срезневский И. И. Древние памятники русского письма и языка. — СПб., 1882. — С. 216–217.
- Спицын А. А. Заметка о каменных крестах, преимущественно Новгородских // Записки отделения русской и славянской археологии. — СПб., 1903. — Т. 5. — Вып. 1.
- Шляпкин И. А. Древние русские кресты. — СПб., 1906. — 1 : Кресты новгородские до XV века, неподвижные и не церковной службы.
- Орлов А. С. Библиография русских надписей XI—XV вв. — М.; Л., 1952. — No. 129.
- Николаева Т. В. Победный крест XIV в. // Древнерусское искусство. — М., 1984. — [Вып. :] XIV—XV вв. — С. 86–93.
- Гордиенко Э. А. Комментарий к описи вотчинам новгородского архиерея и церковной утвари 1763 г. // Новгородский исторический сборник. — СПб., 1995. — Вып. 5 (15). — С. 267.
