= Ioann (archbishop of Novgorod) =

Ioann (Russian: Иоанн) was Archbishop of Novgorod the Great and Pskov from 1388 until his retirement in 1415. He is not to be confused with Archbishop Ilya, who ruled in the twelfth century, and who is often referred to as Ioann in hagiographic literature but was apparently called Ilya during his archiepiscopate.

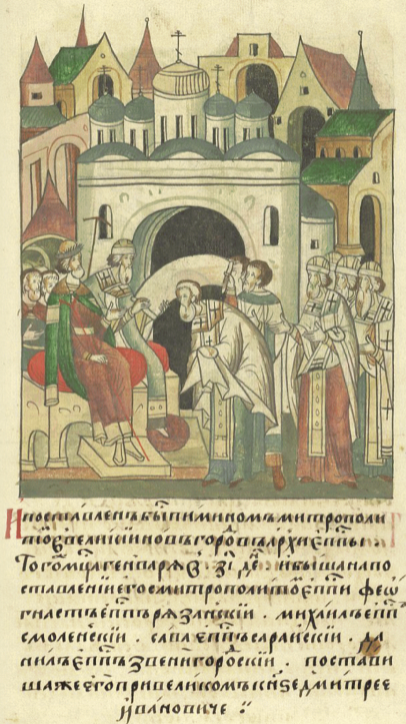
Consecration of John III as Bishop of Novgorod, miniature from the Illustrated Chronicle of Ivan the Terrible

Ioann was elected by the veche with the blessings of his predecessor, Archbishop Aleksei in 1388 (Aleksei had retired to the Dereviatinskii Monastery north of Novgorod where he died in 1390).

The main crisis Ioann faced during his archiepiscopate was the drawn-out dispute between Novgorod and Metropolitan Kiprian that dated to 1376. Kiprian was named the successor to Metropolitan Aleksei (d. 1378) but when he tried to gain recognition from Novgorod as the rightful successor in 1376, he was rebuffed. When he was finally accepted as the Metropolitan of Kiev and All Rus' by Moscow in 1390, he was still not allowed to hear appeals to the archbishop's court in Novgorod or gather a tax, which was the metropolitan's customary right.

Visits in 1391 and 1395 were to no avail, and in retaliation, Grand Prince Vasilii I sent emissaries into the Dvina Land, Novgorod's rich fur-harvesting region north of Moscow, in an effort to strip this region from Novgorod. This move touched off a war, and Archbishop Ioann and the Novgorodian boyardom fought furiously to keep the region from Moscow. The war lasted from 1393 to 1398, and culminated in a Novgorodian campaign in 1397, blessed by the archbishop, which took back the Dvina region, but even after the peace, the metropolitan never visited Novgorod. Indeed, there wasn't another metropolitan visit for almost four decades.

Ioann built a number of churches in Novgorod and renovated the Cathedral of Holy Wisdom. (The main dome was gilded on his orders in 1408.) He also apparently supported raids against the Swedes at Vyborg (he built a church on the first anniversary of one such raid near the end of his tenure) and the expansion of Christianity into the far north, supporting the Valaam Monastery's (violent) efforts to evict the pagan Karelians from the island where they sought to build their monastery.

Ioann retired to the Derevianitskii Monastery in 1415, and died two years later. He was buried in the main church of the monastery near Archbishop Aleksei, his predecessor.

Preceded by Aleksei	Archbishop of Novgorod; 1388–1415	Succeeded by Simeon
