= Vasily Kalika =

Russian saint

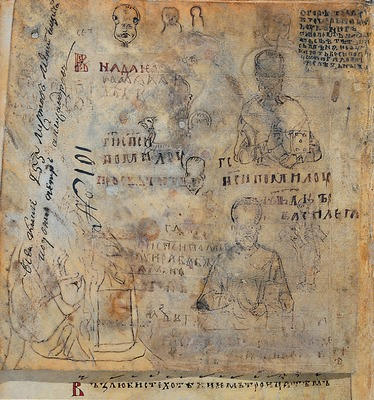
Alleged depiction of Vasily Kalika in the bottom right, Novgorod service menaion

Vasily Kalika (Russian: Василий Калика; died 1352) was Archbishop of Novgorod the Great and Pskov from 1330 to 1352. He is in large part responsible for reinvigorating the office after it had fallen into decline to some extent following the Mongol invasion. He was canonized as a saint by the Russian Orthodox Church.

== Background ==
His baptismal name was originally Grigory and he had been a priest of the Church of Cosmas and Damian on Slave Street north of the Detinets in Novgorod before his archiepiscopate. The name Kalika means "pilgrim" in Russian (there is another word, Palomnik) and indicates that he made a pilgrimage to the Holy Land sometime prior to his archiepiscopate. He, in fact, mentions this in a famous letter he wrote to Bishop Fedor of Tver in 1347 which has been inserted into two Russian chronicles, the Sofia First Chronicle and the Novgorod Second Chronicle. In one redaction of the Novgorodian First Chronicle, he is referred to as Kaleka (rather than Kalika, Church Slavonic: Калѣка), a word meaning "lame" or "cripple". Thus, he is sometimes referred to as "Vasily the Lame" in some hagiographic literature, although the vast majority of scholars consider his surname to be Kalika; if he was lame, there is no other indication of it in the sources.

== Archiepiscopate ==
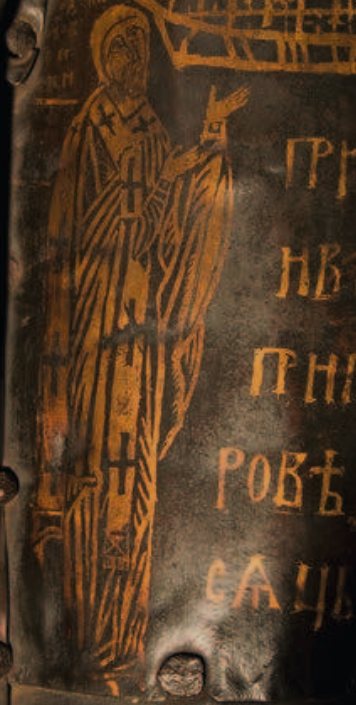
Vasily at the Vasilyevsky Gates, c. 1336

Vasily was elected by the Novgorod veche after the retirement of Archbishop Moisei (1325–1330; 1352–1359). At the time of his election, he was a monk at the Holy Angels' Monastery in Novgorod. The following year, he was sent to Vladimir-in-Volynia to be consecrated by Metropolitan Feognost, who lived in Volhynia for several years. According to a Greek-language register, Vasily was then canonically-elected from among three candidates by a council of bishops there in Volynia.

Very soon after his consecration, Vasily built a stone wall along the northeast side of the Detinets (along the river) between 1331–1333. He also renovated the Cathedral of Holy Wisdom redoing the roof and setting up an iron fence around the cathedral, as well as commissioning a number of icons inside the cathedral and hanging the Vasilyevsky Gates in the cathedral in 1335.

Vasily showed himself over the years to be both an astute political player and a fearless and tireless religious leader. In 1339, he sent his nephew as party to a Novgorodian embassy to sign a peace with Sweden, in which he sought to protect the Orthodox Karelians from being killed if they crossed over to Novgorod. In 1342, when Ontsifor Lukinich caused a riot in the city, Vasily and his vicar, Boris, brought peace between the warring parties. In 1348, when King Magnus Eriksson of Sweden demanded that the Novgorodians debate his theologians over the true faith, Vasily, in consultation with the posadnik, told Magnus to send his theologians to Constantinople, since that is where the Russians had acquired their understanding of Christianity.

That being said, several modern scholars have accused Vasily of not having done enough to fight the Strigolniki heresy that spread through Novgorod and Pskov in the fourteenth and into the fifteenth century. His letter to Bishop Feodor of Tver' has been interpreted as dualist (that is, similar to the Strigolniki) in nature. However, the building projects that he undertook and his vigorous political activity, fully utilizing the church's wealth and property as it were, would have violated the beliefs against clerical or ecclesiastical ownership of land that the Strigolniki held.

In 1352, he was sent by the Novgorodian government to rebuild the fortress of Orekhov, which had recently been destroyed in fighting between Novgorod and Sweden. The remnants of the stone wall he had built (it had been previously a wooden fortress) were excavated in 1969 and can be seen in the courtyard of the fortress today. Later in 1352, he was called to Pskov, which was at that time ravaged by plague. He went to the city and held a number of processions and liturgies until the plague subsided. On his return trip to Novgorod down the Shelon River he himself took ill with plague and died at the Monastery of St. Michael the Archangel on the Shelon' on July 3. His body was brought back to Novgorod and interred in the Martirievskaia Porch in the Cathedral of Holy Wisdom where many of his predecessors and successors are buried. He is a saint of the Russian Orthodox Church (and is commemorated in the Orthodox Church in America and in some of the Eastern Rites of the Catholic Church as well). His feast day is July 3 [O.S. July 16].

== See also ==
- List of Eastern Orthodox Russian saints

Preceded by Moses	Archbishop of Novgorod; 1330–1352	Succeeded by Moses (second term)
