= Leo Tserpitsky =

Metropolitan of Novgorod and Staraya Russa

- Bishop of Novgorod the Great and Staraya Russa
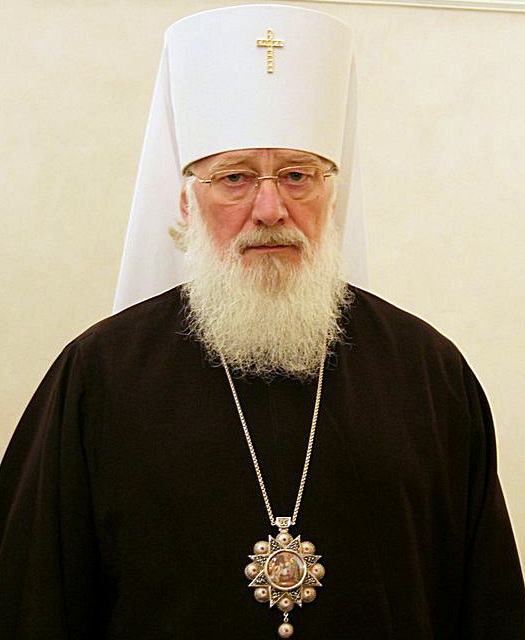
- Bishop Lev in 2012
- Native name: Николай
- Church: Russian Orthodox Church
- Metropolis: Metropoly of Novgorod
- Diocese: Diocese of Novgorod
- Appointed: 20 July 1990
- Predecessor: Sergei Golubtsov
- Successor: Incumbent

Orders
- Ordination: 20 July 1990
- Rank: Metropolitan

Personal details
- Born: Nikolay Lvovich Tserpitsky; 13 April 1946 (age 80) Stowbtsy District, Minsk Region, Byelorussian SSR, Soviet Union
- Denomination: Eastern Orthodox Church

His Eminence Metropolitan Leo (or Lev, Russian: Лев, secular name Nikolay Lvovich Tserpitsky, Николай Львович Церпицкий; born April 13, 1946) is the current Metropolitan of Novgorod and Staraya Russa and administrator of the Borovichi diocese. He was named Bishop of Novgorod the Great and Staraya Russa on July 20, 1990, and elevated to the archiepiscopal dignity on February 25, 1995, and to the metropolitan dignity in January 2012.

== Biography ==
He was born in the village of Zaluzhye in Stowbtsy District of Minsk Region in Belarus on April 13, 1946. His grandfather, father and brother were priests.

After his service in the Soviet Army in 1966–1969, Lev entered the Leningrad Spiritual Academy, graduating in 1975 and successfully defending a candidate's dissertation entitled "Decrees of the Second Vatican Council's 'Constitution on the Sacred Liturgy'" («Постановление II Ватиканского Собора „Конституция о богослужении“»). He studied at the Papal Gregorian University from 1975 to 1978.

On 28 March 1971, he was shorn a monk by Metropolitan Nikodim (Rotov) of Leningrad and Novgorod; he was consecrated a hierodeacon in April of that same year and was consecrated a hieromonk in April 1975. From 1972 to 1975, he was personal secretary to Metropolitan Nikodim. In 1978, he was elevated to the rank of archimandrite and was part of the Russian Orthodox Church's delegation at the funeral of Pope Paul VI and the inauguration of John Paul I; he was with the Metropolitan when Nikodim collapsed and died during an audience with the Pope.

He was consecrated Bishop of Tashkent on November 1, 1987.

Since becoming Bishop (since 1995 - Archbishop) of Novgorod and Staraya Russa, Leo has overseen the rebuilding of the church in the eparchy in the aftermath of the Soviet collapse. He concelebrated the rededication of the Cathedral of Holy Wisdom after it was returned to the Russian Orthodox Church in 1991, reestablished a library in the upper gallery of the cathedral, oversaw the reopening of a number of churches in the eparchy (the Church of St. Philip was the only Orthodox church that remained open in Novgorod during the Soviet period), established a festival in honor of Metropolitan Arsenius (Stadnitsky) of Novgorod (d. 1936), returned the relics of Bishop Nikita (d. 1108) to the Cathedral of Holy Wisdom (in the early Soviet period, they had been kept in a paper bag in the Novgorod Museum; after 1957, they were in the Church of St. Philip), and has patronized other efforts to rebuild the church and church culture in the eparchy.

The Holy Synod on December 28, 2011, appointed him head of the Metropoly of Novgorod (including the diocese of Novgorod and diocese of Borovichi). He was elevated to the rank of metropolitan on January 8, 2012, in the Dormition Cathedral of Moscow Kremlin by Patriarch of Russia, Kirill I.

The Holy Synod on May 14, 2026, entrusted him with the temporary administration of the Diocese of Borovichi, as Bishop Ephraim of Borovichi and Pestovo retired.

== Awards and honors ==
Lev has been the recipient of several secular and ecclesiastical awards. In 1992, he was made an honorary citizen of Novgorod the Great. On March 30, 2006, President Vladimir Putin awarded him the Order For Merit to the Fatherland, 4th class (За заслуги перед Отечеством» IV степени). He has also received the Order of Honour (Знак Почёта), the Order of Sergius of Radonezh, 4th class (Орден преподобного Сергия Радонежского III степени), and the Order of St. Prince Daniel of Moscow (Орден св. блгв. кн. Даниила Московского). In 2004, he was a recipient of the Yaroslav the Wise Medal, 1st class (Медалью Ярослава Мудрого I степени) awarded by Novgorod State University.
