= Luka Zhidiata =

Archbishop of Novgorod from 1035–60

Luka Zhidiata (Russian: Лука Жидята) was the second bishop of Novgorod (c. 1035 – c. 1059) and saint of the Russian Orthodox Church. He replaced Efrem who administered the eparchy since the death of Joachim of Korsun without being consecrated as a bishop.

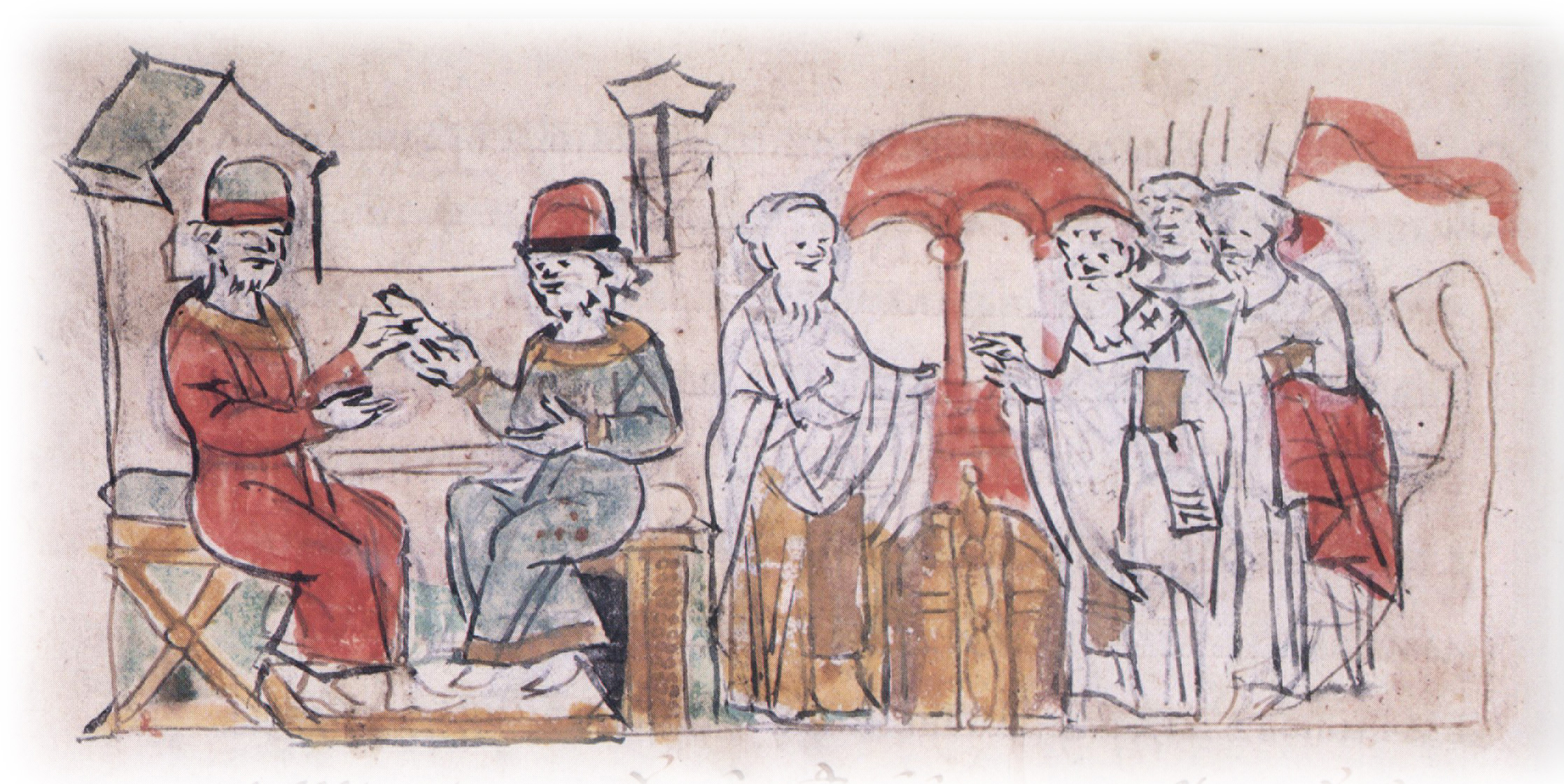
The consecration of Luke as bishop, miniature from the Radziwiłł Chronicle (15th century)

Little is known of Luka. He was the first native-born bishop of the church; all previous ones had been Greek. The original Cathedral of Holy Wisdom burned down during his episcopate and was replaced by the current stone structure, possibly the oldest building still in use in Russia, which Luka consecrated on 14 September 1052.

Luka opposed the Kievan grand princes' appointments of Hilarion and Efrem as metropolitans of Kiev, not simply to oppose Kiev, but because it was the prerogative of the Patriarch of Constantinople to name the Kievan metropolitan. He suffered slander at the hands of his slave, Dudik, and was recalled to Kiev and held there for three years. When the slander was uncovered, the slave’s nose and both hands were cut off. Luka died along the Kopys River (in modern Belarus) during his return journey to Novgorod, on 15 October 1059 or 1060, and was buried in the Cathedral of Holy Wisdom.

Some historians say that Luka got his nickname (Zhidiata) due to his Jewish ancestry while others argue that it is a derivative of the name Georgy or Zhidoslav.

| Preceded by Yefrem acting | Bishop of Novgorod; 1035–1060 | Succeeded by Stefan |
