= Joachim of Korsun =

First bishop of Novgorod

Joachim of Korsun (Russian: Иоаким Корсунянин) was the first bishop of Novgorod the Great (r. ca. 989 – 1030). His surname suggests he probably came from the Byzantine town of Cherson (Korsun) on the Crimean Peninsula and, according to the chronicles, arrived in Kievan Rus' around the time of the Christianization of Kievan Rus' in 988. Upon his arrival in Novgorod, he cast the idol of the god Perun into the Volkhov River and built the Peryn Monastery on the site where it once stood. He also built the first, wooden, Cathedral of Holy Wisdom, “with 12 tops,” on the site of a pagan cemetery. He also built the Church of Joachim and Anne, named for his patron saints, which stood near the present site of the Cathedral of Holy Wisdom. He was buried there on his death in 1030, but his remains were transferred into the current cathedral in 1598.

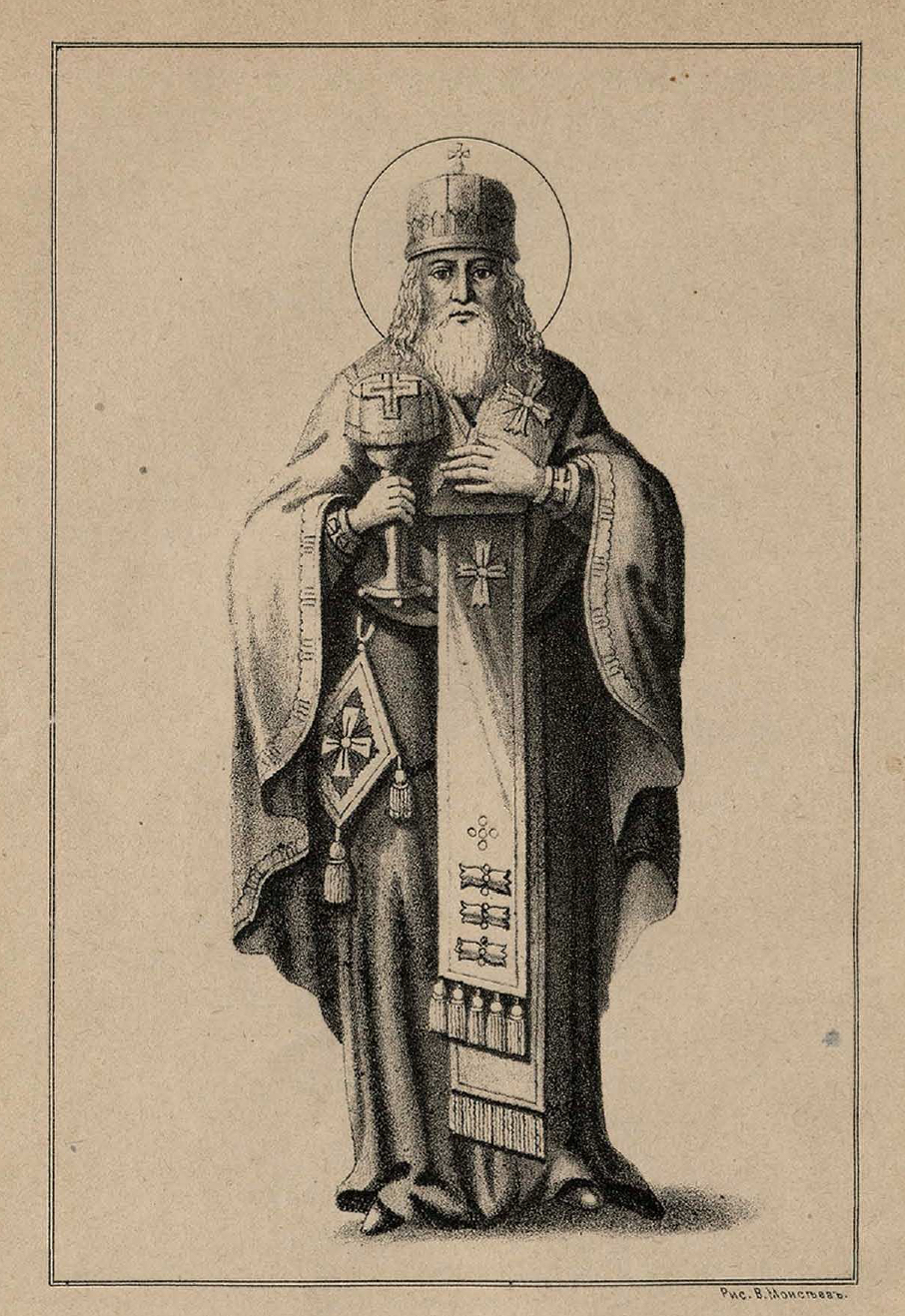
Portrait of Joachim, 19th century.

Very little is known of his episcopate; although the Ioakimovskaia Letopis (Joachim Chronicle), a no longer extant source cited in the history of Vasilyev Tatishchev, was traditionally attributed to Joachim of Korsun. This is now considered to be highly questionable, as is the historical reliability of Tatishchev's work: it is more likely a seventeenth-century compilation and is now often attributed to Patriarch Joachim of Moscow (d. 1690).

Upon his death in 1030, Joachim's disciple, Efrem, administered the eparchy for five years (1030–1035) until the arrival of Luka Zhidiata. Joachim of Korsun is venerated as a saint by the Russian Orthodox Church. His feast days are February 10 (the feast of the Novgorodian Saints, in which 10 other bishops and archbishops and others are commemorated) and June 19.
