= Serapion of Novgorod =

Serapion (Russian: Серапион; died March 16, 1516) was Archbishop of Novgorod the Great and Pskov from 1506 to 1509. He is a saint of the Russian Orthodox Church; his feast day is March 16 by the Julian calendar.

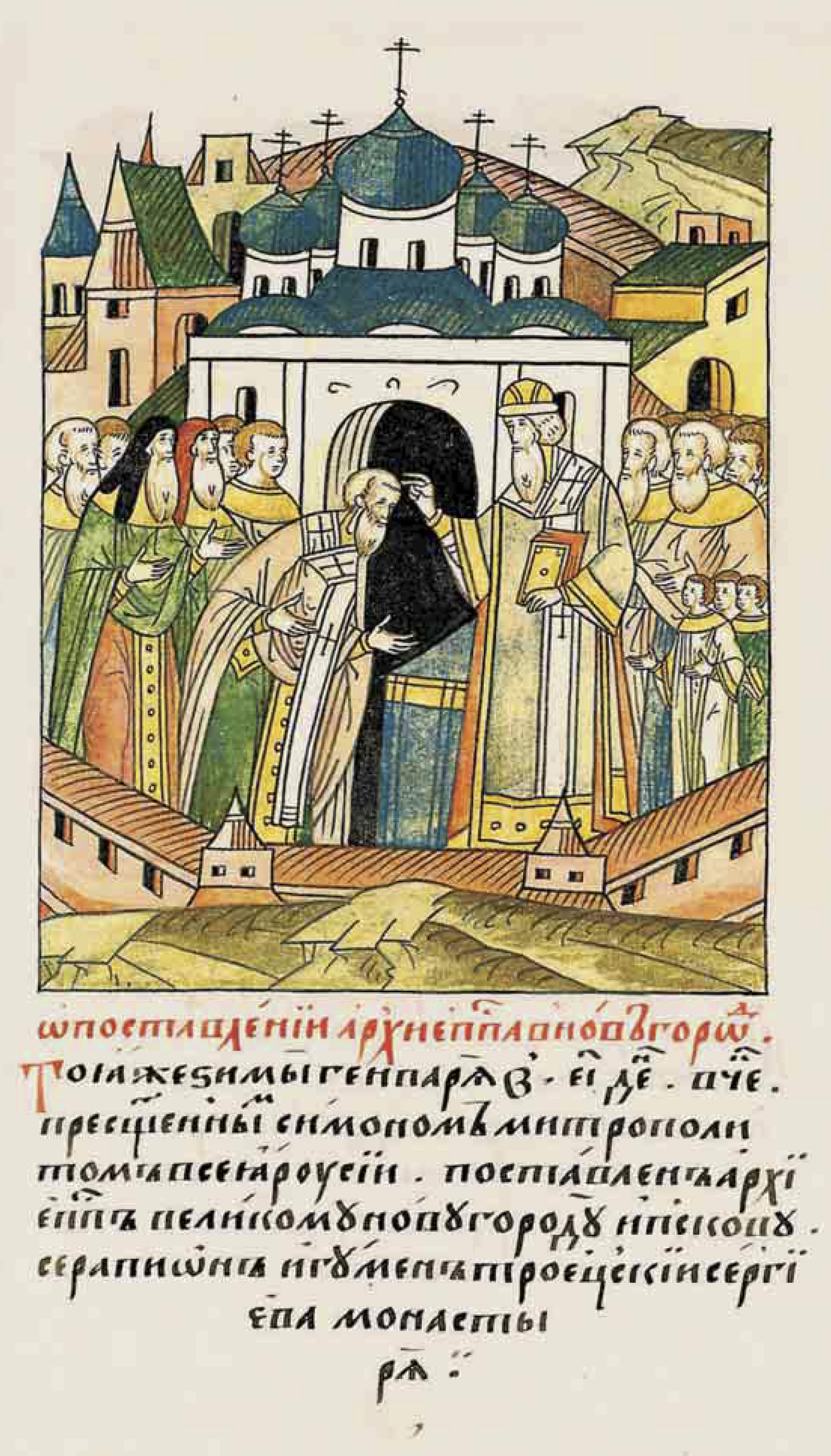
Consecration of Serapion as Bishop of Novgorod, miniature from the Illustrated Chronicle of Ivan the Terrible

Serapion came from the Muscovite village of Pekhorka (now Pekhra-Pokrovskoye within Balashikha in Moscow Oblast). He took monastic vows in the Dubensk Dormition monastery, where he went on to become hegumen. He was subsequently hegumen of the Stromyn Dormition monastery (both cloisters were liquidated in the 18th century), and then became hegumen of the Trinity monastery (now Troitse-Sergiyeva Lavra) in 1493.

With the consent of Great Prince Vasily III of Moscow, he was consecrated Archbishop of Novgorod on January 15, 1506, but only served a little over three years. In July 1509, at the Sobor that considered the conflict between him and Joseph Volotsky (the latter was under Serapion's episcopal jurisdiction but had directly appealed to Simon, Metropolitan of Moscow - an act that Serapion deemed to be uncanonical), and his letter of complaint, in which he said Joseph had abandoned heaven (meaning he had abandoned his rightful bishop) and descended to earth. The grand prince took this as a personal insult, that Serapion was claiming the local prince was divinely mandated and Grand Prince Vasilii III was mundane. Serapion was found guilty, removed from office, and confined to the Andronikov monastery. In 1511, he was freed and spent the rest of his life in the Trinity monastery. He died on March 16, 1516. Sources claim he made peace with Volotsky and others, but there is some evidence that he remained bitter at his removal to the end of his life. After his death, the See of Novgorod remained vacant for 17 years.

Preceded by Gennady	Archbishop of Novgorod; 1506–1509	Succeeded by Makary
