= Euthymius II of Novgorod =

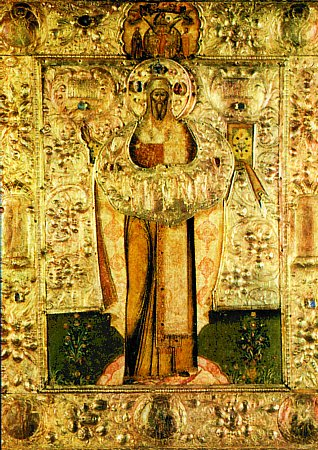
Evfimy II of Novgorod

Euthymius II of Novgorod (Russian: Евфимий II, romanized: Evfimy II) was Archbishop of Novgorod from 1429 to 1458. He was one of the most prolific patrons of the arts and architecture of all the Novgorodian archbishops.

== His Background ==
According to his saint's lives, Evfimy's baptismal name was Ioann or Ivan and he was the son of a priest Fedor, and his wife, Anna, although some saint's lives give his father's name as Mikheia, and say he was the priest of the Church of St. Fedor the Great Martyr on the Market side of the city (today it is just east of the Aleksandr Nevsky Bridge on the main road running east out of the city.

== His Monastic and Archiepiscopal Life ==
He was shorn a monk at the Listitsa Hill Monastery (Listitsky) and later transferred to the Vyazhishchsky Monastery 12 miles (7 km) northwest of Novgorod (he is known as Evfimy Viazhishchskii for this reason). He was elected archbishop by the veche after the death of his predecessor Evfimy I (Bradatii) in 1429 but was not consecrated until 1434, and not in Moscow by the Metropolitan of Kiev and All Rus' but in Smolensk, by Geronty, the Metropolitan of Lithuania, an act which angered the Muscovite authorities (although there was no metropolitan in Moscow at the time: Fotii had died in 1431 and Isidor would not arrive until 1437).

== Cultural Patronage ==
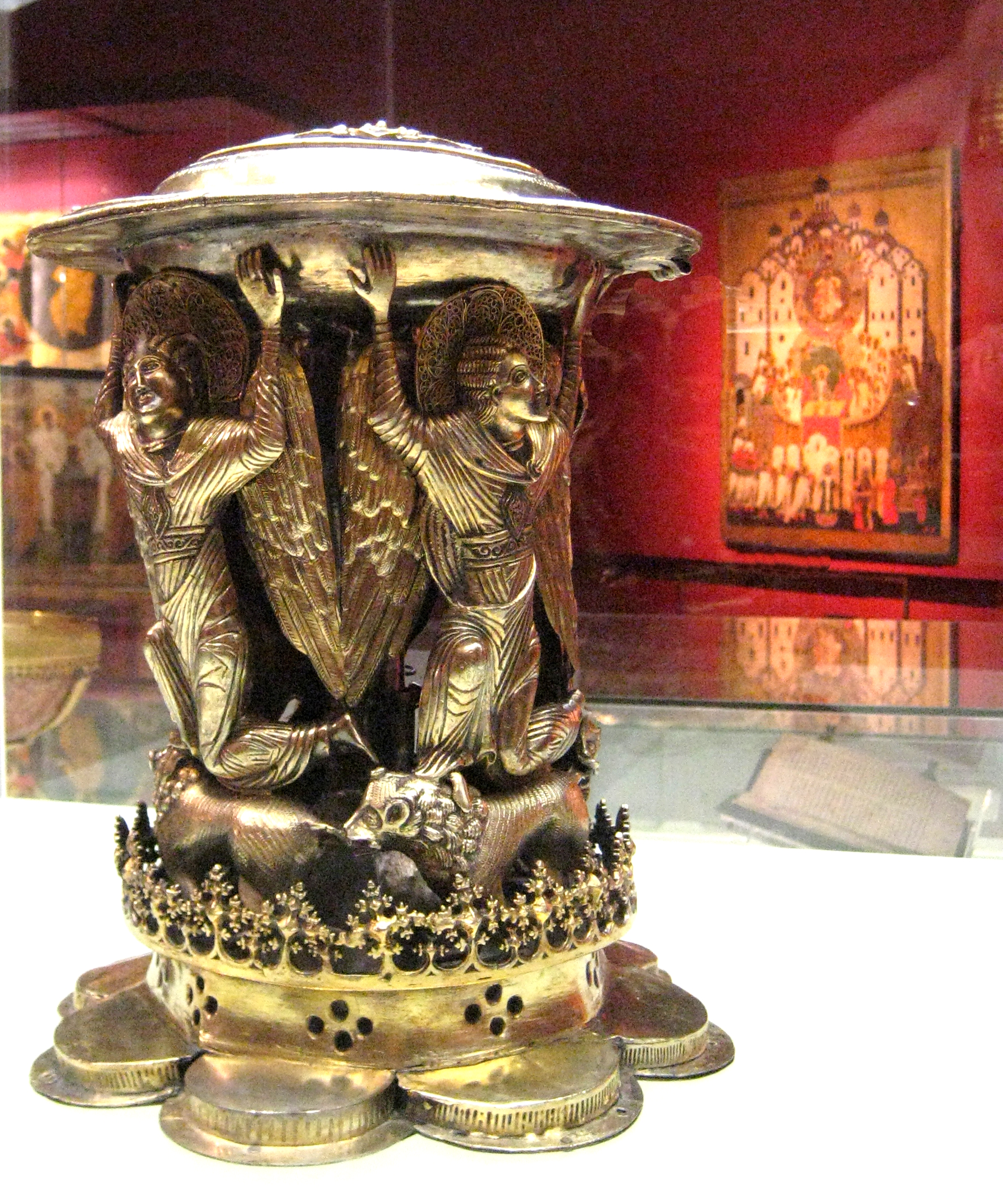
Panagiar ordered by Evfimy II

Evfimy was one of the greatest cultural patrons builders in Novgorod's history. Much of his cultural patronage looked back on Novgorodian history and his building projects were often reconstructions of old churches on their old foundations and in the old architectural styles. He built or rebuilt more than a dozen churches according to the chronicles, several of which still stand in Novgorod today, including the Church of the Twelve Apostles, The Church of John the Forerunner at Opoky (originally built by Prince Vsevolod Mstislavich in 1127), the Church of the Assumption (also originally built by Vsevolod Mstislavich, the Church of St. George at the Market (again, also originally built by Vsevolod Mstislavich) (the three are right next to one another in the northern part of the Market). He also built a number of secular buildings. The Palace of Facets, built in 1433, still stands northwest of the Cathedral of Holy Wisdom. He also built the belfry to the east of the cathedral and a clocktower west of it. The clocktower collapsed and was rebuilt in 1673.

Evfimy also canonized a number of his predecessors and promoted the veneration of other Novgorodian saints. He discovered the relics of Archbishop Ilya (Ioann) in 1439 and commemorated him as well as 8 other bishops and archbishops who appeared in a vision earlier that year. Legends pertaining to the city in general and the archbishops specifically were compiled under his auspices such as the legends surrounding Archbishop Ilya and others. He brought in Pachomius the Serb to write a number of hagiographic pieces surrounding several Novgorodian saints, many of them Evfimy's predecessors in the archiepiscopal office. Pachomius arrived in Novgorod at the end of the 1430s or beginning of the 1440s, and, under Evfimii's aegis, he composed the Life of Varlaam of Khutyn, the founder of the Khutyn Monastery, as well as the "Tale of the Journey of Ioann (Il'ia, Archbishop of Novgorod 1165-1186) on a Devil to Jerusalem." Pachomius returned to Novgorod and, under the patronage of Archbishop Iona, wrote the Life of Evfimy as well. Thus Evfimy, who did so much to patronize culture, became himself a cultural icon.

== The Decline of the Republic ==
Evfimy's archiepiscopate was in some ways one of the high points of the archiepiscopal office in Novgorod. But in spite of this, and in spite of a flourishing of culture, Novgorod suffered a humiliating defeat at the hands of Grand Prince Vasily II in 1456 and signed a severe peace at Iazhelbitsy which limited Novgorod's ability to conduct foreign policy (it required the Grand Prince's approval and could not ally with his enemies).

Evfimy ceased to be active about 1456 (he is not mentioned as part of the peace treaty and did not build churches after 1456 either). It may be that the humiliating defeat affected him personally and he withdrew. He died on 11 March 1458, and was buried in the Viazhishchskii Monastery where he had been a monk.

== Sainthood ==
Evfimy's Life appeared in a mention (monthly books of saints' lives and services) as early as 1494 and he was formally canonised by the Russian Orthodox Church's Moscow Council of 1549. His feast day is 11 March OS/24 March in the Gregorian Calendar. Upon disinterring his remains, they were said to have been incorrupt. His body now lies in a glass-covered sarcophagus in the Church of St. Evfimy in the Viazhishchskii Monastery after the church was dedicated to him by Metropolitan Aleksei of Leningrad and Novgorod (now Patriarch of Moscow) on 31 March 1990. A new church dedicated to Evfimy and Archbishop Gennady also stands in the cemetery at Kovoleva just east of St. Petersburg.

Preceded by Evfimy I	Archbishop of Novgorod; 1429-1458	Succeeded by Iona
