= Cathedral of Saint Sophia, Novgorod =

Cathedral church of the Archbishop of Novgorod and mother church of Novgorodian Eparchy

Cathedral of Saint Sophia Софийский собор (in Russian)
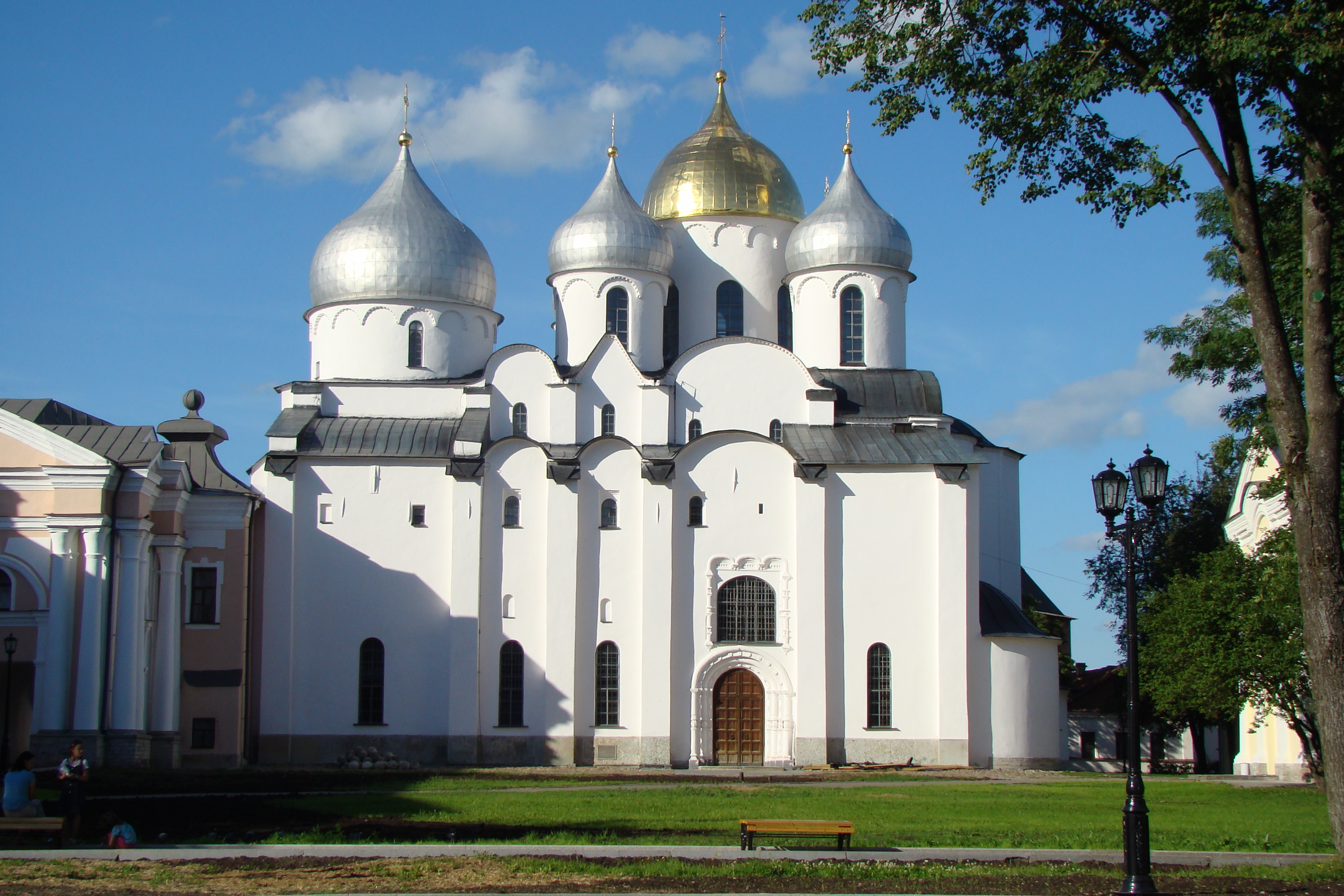
- View of the cathedral from the southeast

Religion
- Affiliation: Russian Orthodox
- Province: Diocese of Novgorod and Staraya Russa
- Year consecrated: 1045 — 1050

Location
- Location: Veliky Novgorod, Russia
- Interactive map of Cathedral of Saint Sophia; Софийский собор (in Russian)
- Coordinates: 58°31′20″N 31°16′36″E

Architecture
- Type: Church
- Groundbreaking: 1045
- Completed: 1050

Specifications
- Height (max): 38 metres (125 ft)
- Dome: 5
- UNESCO World Heritage Site
- Official name: Historic Monuments of Novgorod and Surroundings
- Type: Cultural
- Criteria: ii, iv, vi
- Designated: 1992 (16th session)
- Reference no.: 604
- State Party: Russia
- Region: Eastern Europe

The Cathedral of Saint Sophia, the Holy Wisdom of God (Russian: Кафедральный собор Софии Премудрости Божией), in Veliky Novgorod, Russia, is the cathedral church of the Metropolitan of Novgorod and the mother church of the Novgorodian Eparchy.

== History ==
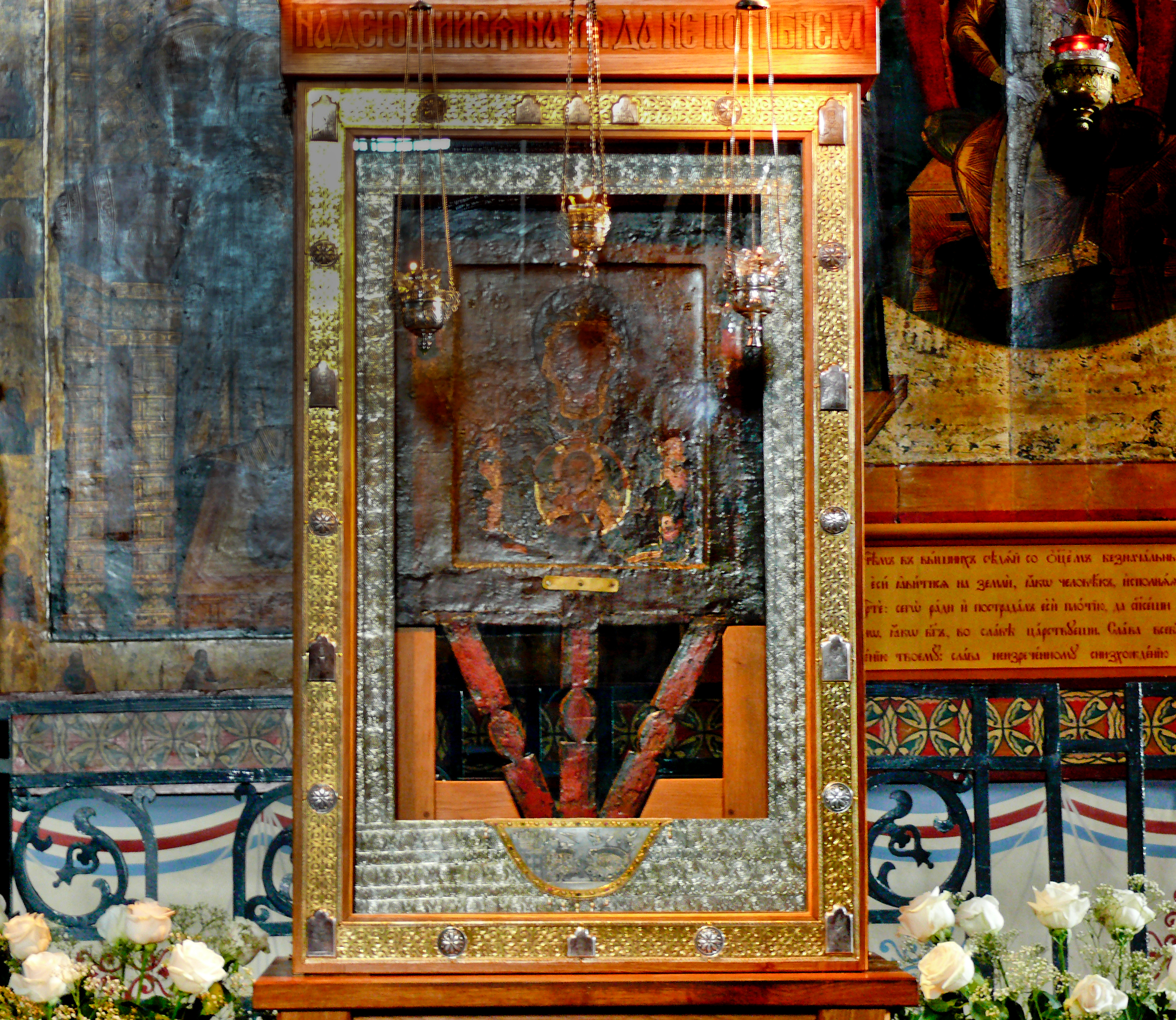
Inside the church is Our Lady of the Sign, an icon credited with saving Novgorod from Andrei Bogolyubsky's troops in 1170.

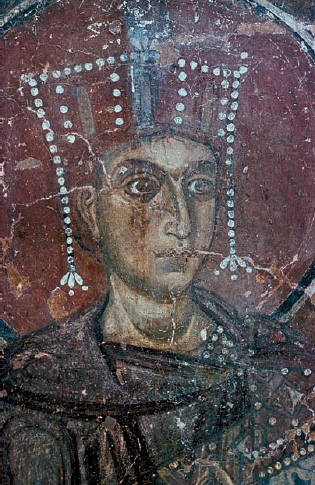
An 11th century fresco on the wall

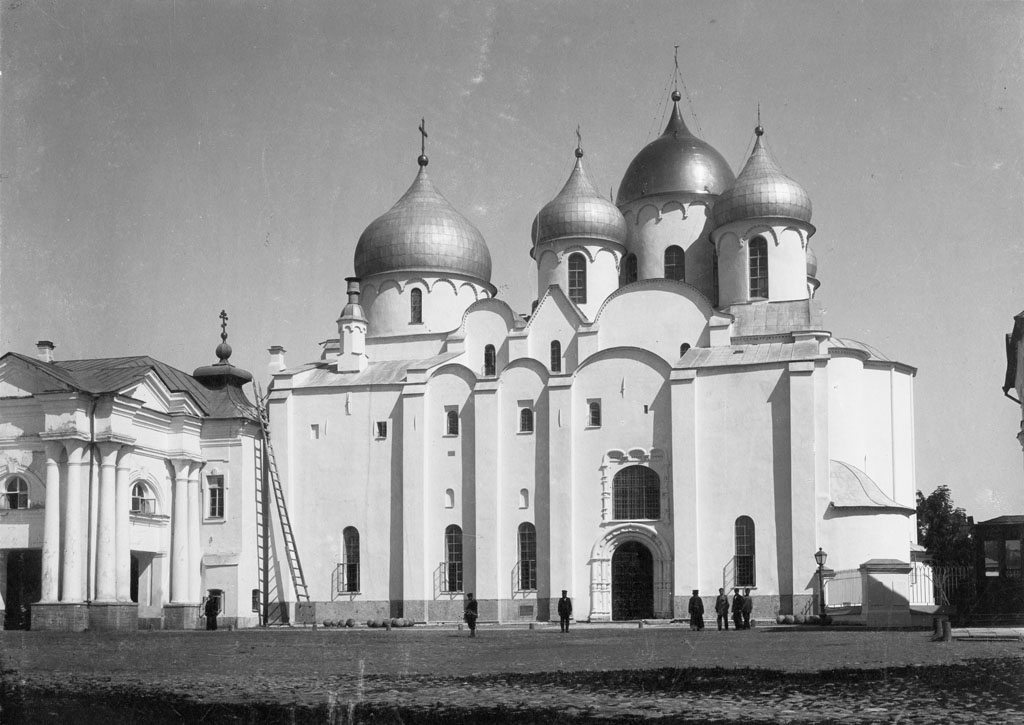
The Cathedral of Holy Wisdom in 1900

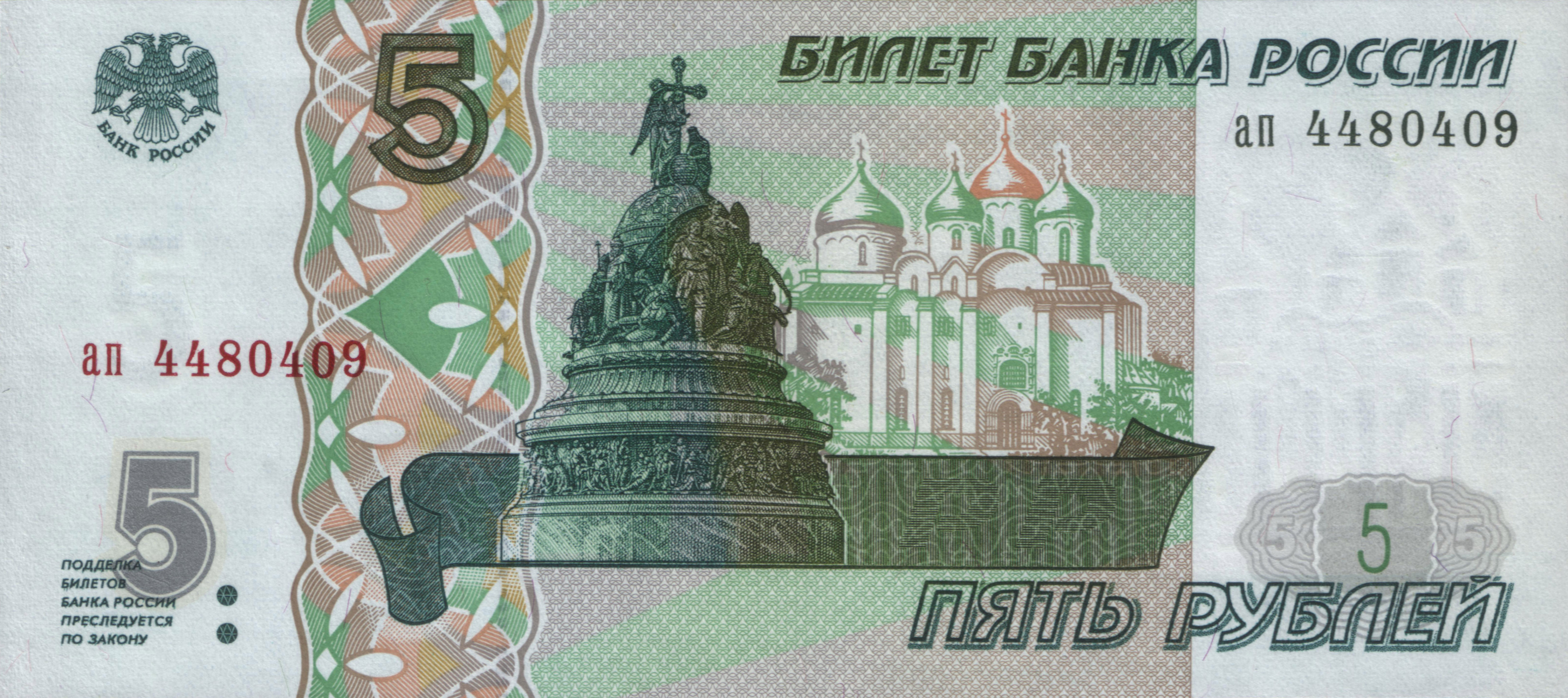
Millennium of Russia and the Cathedral of Holy Wisdom on a 5-ruble bill

The Cross of Novgorod, found at the Cathedral

The 38-metre-high, five-domed, stone cathedral was built by Vladimir of Novgorod and Bishop Luka Zhidiata between 1045 and 1050 to replace an oaken cathedral built by Bishop Ioakim Korsunianin in the late tenth century. That makes it the oldest church building in Russia outside the Caucasus (Tkhaba-Yerdy in Ingushetia dates from before the 8th century) and the oldest building of any kind still in use in the country, with the exception of the Arkhyz and Shoana churches. It was consecrated by Bishop Luka Zhidiata (1035-1060) on 14 September 1050 or 1052, the feast of the Exaltation of the Cross. (A fresco just inside the south entrance depicts Sts. Constantine and Helena, who found the true cross in the fourth century, it is one of the oldest works of art in the cathedral and is thought to commemorate its dedication). While it is commonly known as St. Sophia's, it is not named for any of the female saints of that name (i.e. Sophia of Rome or Sophia the Martyr); rather, the name comes from the Greek word for wisdom (σοφία, from whence we get words like philosophia or philosophy "the love of wisdom"), and thus Novgorod's cathedral is dedicated to the Holy Wisdom of God, in imitation of the Hagia Sophia cathedral of Constantinople. Holy Wisdom is a reference to Christ.

The main, golden, cupola was gilded by Archbishop Ioann (1388-1415) in 1408. The sixth (and the largest) dome crowns a tower which leads to the upper galleries. In medieval times, they were said to hold the Novgorodian treasury had library there that is said to have been started by Yaroslav the Wise. When the library was moved to the St. Petersburg Spiritual Academy in 1859, it had more than 1,500 volumes, some dating back to the 13th century. The current archbishop, Lev, has reestablished a library there in keeping with the ancient tradition. As of 2004, it housed some 5000 volumes. A Sunday school is also held in the gallery.

The cupolas are thought to have acquired their present helmet-like shape in the 1150s, when the cathedral was restored after a fire. The interior was painted in 1108 at the behest of Bishop Nikita (1096-1108) although the project was not undertaken until shortly after his death. Archbishop Nifont (1130-1156) had the exterior whitewashed and had the Martirievskii and Pretechenskaia porches (papter', more akin to side chapels) painted sometime during his tenure, but those frescoes are hardly visible now because of frequent fires. In the 1860s, parts of the interior had to be repainted, and most of the current frescoes are from the 1890s. A white stone belltower in five bays was built by Archbishop Evfimy II (1429-1458), the greatest architectural patron to ever hold the archiepiscopal office. He also had the Palace of Facets built just northwest of the cathedral in 1433. The nearby clocktower was initially completed under his patronage as well. It fell down in the 17th century and was restored in 1673.

From the 12th to the 15th centuries, the cathedral was a ceremonial and spiritual centre of the Novgorod Republic, which sprawled from the Baltic Sea to the Ural Mountains and came to symbolize the city itself, with chronicle references to the Novgordians being willing "to lay down their heads for Holy Wisdom" or "to die honorably for Holy Wisdom". When one prince angered them, they told him "we have no prince, only God, the Truth, and Holy Wisdom." On another occasion, they made the cathedral the symbol of the city itself, saying "Where Holy Wisdom is, there is Novgorod".

The House of Holy Wisdom (Дом святой Софии/Dom svyatoy Sofii) was one of the largest landowners in the Novgorod Land. Its possessions were spread across all parts of Novgorod land and outside of it. In the 16th century, the House had its own court in Moscow, and by the second half of 17th century, it also owned 41 monasteries with their land and peasants. The bishop (later archbishop) headed the House of Holy Wisdom. He was assisted by the head of the chancellery (d'yak) and treasurer and about 100 other staff who included scribes, bookbinders, icon painters and silversmiths.

The cathedral has long been the city's great necropolis, the burial place of 47 people of prominence in the city's history, including several princes and posadniks and 32 bishops, archbishops, and metropolitans of Novgorod. The first burial there was Prince Vladimir himself in 1052. The first bishop was Luka Zhidiata in 1060. The last burial in the cathedral was Metropolitan Gurii in 1912. Most of the burials are below the floor in the Martirievskaia Porch, on the south side of the cathedral, named for Bishop Martirii (1193-1199). Later burials took place (again below the floor) in the Pretechenskaia Papter' on the north side of the cathedral. Today, there are several burials in the main body of the church. The sarcophagi of Prince Vladimir and Princess Anna overlook the Martirievskaia Porch; Archbishop Ilya (also known as Ioann) (1165-1186) is buried in the northwestern corner of the main body of the church, next to the Pretechenskaia Porch. Bishop Nikita lies in a glass-covered sarcaphogus between the chapels of the Nativity of the Mother of God and Sts. Ioakim and Anne and the sarcophagus is opened on his feast days (30 January, the day of his death and 30 April/13 May, the day of the "uncovering of his relics", i.e., when his tomb was opened in 1558) so the faithful can venerate his relics. Two other princes also lie in the main body of the cathedral and in the Chapel of the Nativity of the Mother of God.

The cathedral was looted by Ivan the Terrible in the 1570s but restored by Archbishop Leonid (1572-1575). He built the Tsar's Pew, which stands just inside the south entrance of the main body of the cathedral near the Martirievskii Porch. Leonid also had several large chandeliers hung in the cathedral, but only one of them survives.

Beginning in the 18th century, the archbishops or metropolitans of Novgorod lived in St. Petersburg (they were known as archbishops or metropolitans of Novgorod and St. Petersburg). Thus, while Novgorod technically still had a prelate, he was not often active in the city itself, and the church in the city was administered by a vicar bishop for much of the time. Twelve metropolitans of Novgorod and St. Petersburg (or Leningrad) are buried in the Alexander Nevsky Lavra in St. Petersburg, rather than in the Cathedral of Holy Wisdom.

During the German occupation of Novgorod, the Kremlin was heavily damaged from the battles and from the Nazi abuse. However, the cathedral itself survived. The large cross on the main dome (which has a metal bird attached to it, perhaps symbolic of the Holy Spirit in the form of a dove) was removed by Spanish infantry. For over 60 years, it resided in the Madrid Military Engineering Academy Museum. Im 16 November 2004, when it was handed over back to the Russian Orthodox Church by the Spanish brothers Miguel Ángel and Fernando Garrido Polonio who discovered the Cross in a military camp in Madrid. The domes were heavily damaged in the war, and the large Christ Pantocrator in the dome was ruined. According to legend, the painters painted him with a clenched fist. The archbishop told them to repaint Christ with an open palm, and when they returned the next morning, the hand was miraculously clenched again.

After repeated efforts, a voice from the dome is said to have told the archbishop to leave the painting alone for as long as Christ's fist remained closed, he would hold the fate of Novgorod in his hand.

During the Soviet period, the cathedral was a museum. It was returned to the Russian Orthodox Church in 1991. An inscription on the north wall of the west entrance attests to its rededication by Bishop Lev and Patriarch Alexius II.

== Features ==
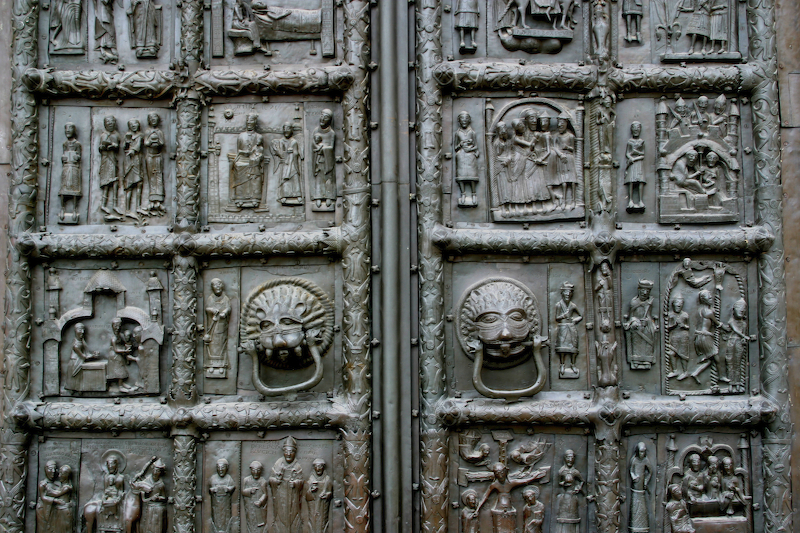
Detail of a portion of the Płock, Sigtuna or Magdeburg Gates at the West Entrance to the cathedral

Novgorod's St. Sophia was the first Slavic church in which local divergences from Byzantine pattern were made so evident. With its austere walls and narrow windows, the church is redolent of Romanesque architecture of Western Europe, rather than of Greek churches built at that time.

The Novgorod cathedral also differs strikingly from its namesake and contemporary in Kyiv. As one art historian put it, the Kyiv cathedral is a bride, whereas the Novgorod cathedral is a warrior. Its decoration is minimal, the use of brick is limited, and the masses are arranged vertically rather than horizontally. These features proved to be influential with Novgorod masters of the next generation, as the Yuriev Monastery Cathedral (1119) and the Antoniev Monastery Cathedral (1117) clearly show.

=== Icons ===
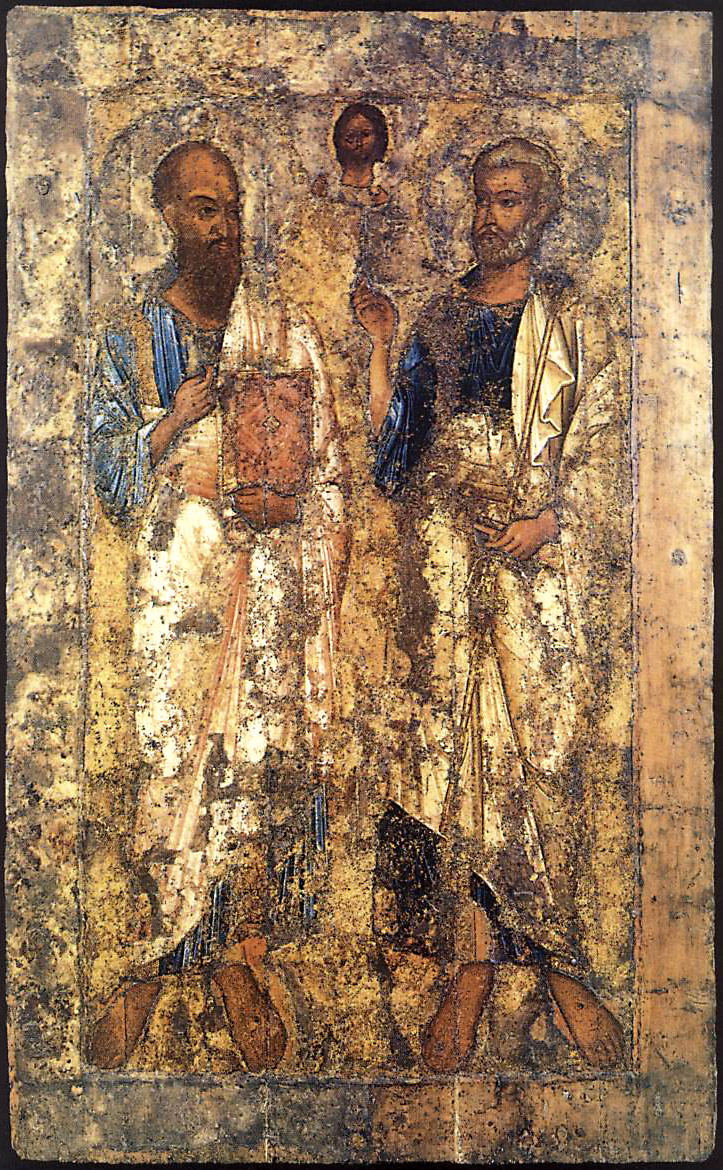
One of the 11th century Korsun icons kept in Saint Sophia Cathedral until the Russian Revolution (236 × 147 cm).

The oldest icon in the cathedral is probably the Icon of the Mother of God of the Sign, which according to legend miraculously saved Novgorod in 1169 when the Suzdalians attacked the city; it was brought out of the Church of the Transfiguration on Il'ina Street and displayed in the cathedral and on the walls of the city by Archbishop Ilya. The Church of the Icon Mother of God of the Sign was built next to the Church of the Transfiguration in the seventeenth century to house the icon. During the Soviet period, it was housed in the nearby Novgorod Museum (as were the bones of Bishop Nikita, said to have been kept in a paper bag until they were transferred to the Church of Sts. Philip and Nicholas in 1957); the icon was returned to the cathedral in the early 1990s and stands just to the right of the Golden Doors of the iconostasis. The icon of Sophia, the Holy Wisdom of God, is also quite old and is part of the iconostasis just to the right of the Golden Doors as well (where the icon of the saint to which the church is dedicated usually hangs). Several icons were said to have been painted or commissioned by Archbishop Vasilii Kalika (1330-1352) and Archbishop Iona (1458-1470) and Archbishop Makarii (1526-1542) (he went on to become Metropolitan of Moscow and All Rus') is said to have painted the icons in the small iconostasis in the Chapel of the Nativity of the Mother of God (the iconostasis originally stood in the Chapel of Sts. Ioakim and Anne, just to the left of its present location.

=== Gates ===
Three famous sets of gates adorned the cathedral over the centuries; they are known as the Korsun, Vasilii, and Sigtuna (or Płock, or Magdeburg) Gates. The Korsun Gates hang at the western entrance to the Chapel of the Nativity of the Mother of God at the southeast corner of the cathedral. They were said to have been brought to Novgorod by Bishop Ioakim Korsunianin, whose name indicates ties to Korsun in Crimea. The Vasilii Gates were donated to the cathedral in 1335 by Archbishop Vasilii Kalika and were taken by Tsar Ivan IV to his residence in Alexandrov near Moscow following the looting of the cathedral in 1570, where they still may be seen. They influenced artwork in the Moscow Kremlin executed under Ivan the Terrible. The doors at the west entrance (intended to be the main entrance to the cathedral, although the main one is now the northern entrance), called the Sigtuna, Magdeburg or Płock Gates, are said to have been looted by Novgorodian forces from the Swedish town of Sigtuna in 1187. In fact, they were most probably wrought and sculptured by Magdeburg masters, most likely in years 1152-1154, for the Archbishop of Płock in Poland (where they were decorating one of the entrances into the Cathedral in Płock for around 250 years).

The gates were acquired by the Novgorodians most probably in the end of the 15th century, probably by Archbishop Evfimii II, who loved Western art (as can be seen in the Gothic style incorporated into the Palace of Facets) or — according to another theory — in the first half of the 15th century by prince of Novgorod and brother of the Polish king, Simeon Lingwen. It is not known precisely how the Novgorodians acquired the Płock Gates — most probably they were a gift from Archbishops of Płock or the dukes of Mazovia for the brother of Polish-Lithuanian King Władysław Jagiełło, Lithuanian Duke Lengvenis, or for Archbishop Evfimii II. There is also another theory that the gates had been looted from the cathedral in Płock by pagan Lithuanians in the thirteenth century, and later somehow made their way to Novgorod. The first theory is considered the most likely. The Magdeburg or Płock Gates (sometimes also wrongly called the Sigtuna Gates) are opened only twice a year for special occasions, although some reports say that they are opened when the archbishop himself leads the Divine Liturgy. Since 1982, copies of the Gates, a gift from Novgorod, hang in the Cathedral in Płock.

=== Pigeon ===
A figure of pigeon — the symbol of the Holy Spirit — crowns the cross on the main dome of the cathedral. According to a local legend, a live pigeon sitting on the dome froze out of terror seeing the Massacre of Novgorod. In the 18th century the cathedral's treasury included a gold-plated silver pigeon. The dome and the figure were destroyed during the Nazi occupation of Novgorod and then restored after the war. The original figure was returned to Novgorod in 2005 by former members of the Blue Division who fought in Novgorod.

== See also ==
- Saint Sophia Cathedral, Kyiv
- Saint Sophia Cathedral in Polotsk
- Hagia Sophia
