= Diocese of Novgorod =

Diocese of the Russian Orthodox Church in Veliky Novgorod

Coordinates: 58°29′15″N 31°17′03″E

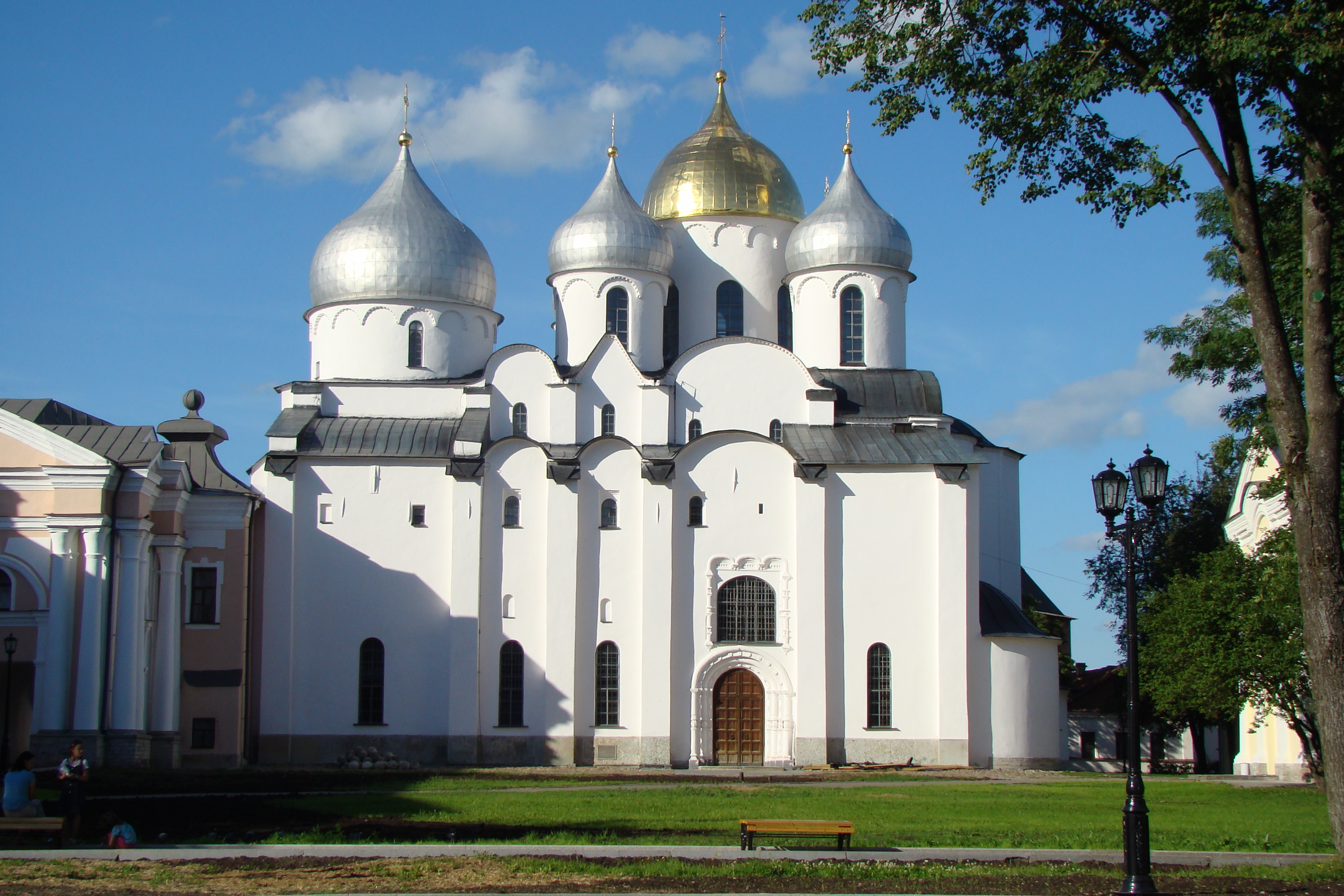
- Saint Sophia Cathedral, July 2009

Location
- Headquarters: Veliky Novgorod

Information
- Denomination: Eastern Orthodox
- Sui iuris church: Russian Orthodox Church
- Established: end of the 10th century
- Language: Old Church Slavonic

Current leadership
- Governance: Eparchy
- Bishop: Leo (Tserpitsky)

Website
- www.vn-eparhia.ru

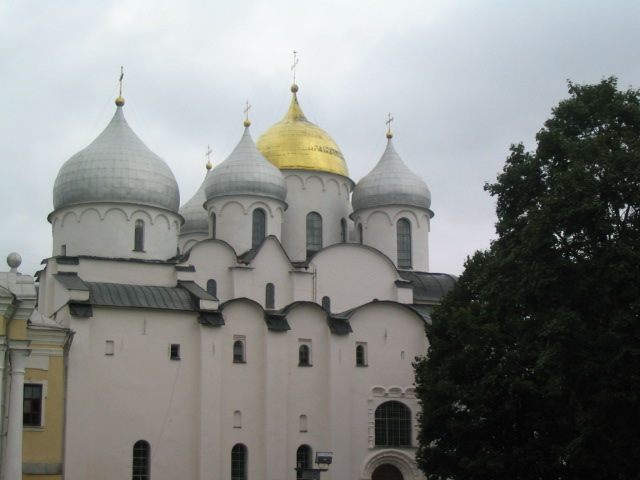
The Cathedral of Holy Wisdom in Novgorod the Great, the cathedral church of the Archbishop of Novgorod, consecrated in 1052.

The Diocese of Novgorod (Russian: Новгородская епархия) is one of the oldest offices in the Russian Orthodox Church. The medieval archbishops of Novgorod were among the most important figures in medieval Russian history and culture and their successors (as bishops, archbishops, or metropolitans) have continued to play significant roles in Russian history up to the present day. They patronised a significant number of churches in and around the city (several of which can still be seen today), and their artistic and architectural embellishments influenced later Russian art and architecture; they also patronized chronicle-writing, a crucial source on medieval Russian history.

== The Republican period ==
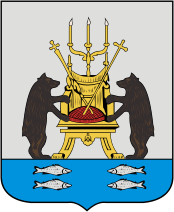
Novgorod the Great's Coat of Arms, depicting the archiepiscopal throne and staffs.

The office of bishop of Novgorod was created around the time of the Christianization of Kievan Rus' (988), although the chronicles give conflicting dates for its establishment ranging anywhere from 989 to 992. The first bishop, Joachim of Korsun (ca. 989-1030), built the first (wooden) Cathedral of Holy Wisdom (also called St. Sofia's) "with thirteen tops" around the time of his arrival in Novgorod. That cathedral burned in 1045, and the current, stone, cathedral, the oldest building still in use in Russia today, was built between 1045 and 1050 by Prince Vladimir Iaroslavich. It was consecrated by Bishop Luka Zhidiata (1035-1060) on the Feast of the Exaltation of the Cross, 14 September 1052 (an eleventh-century fresco just inside the south door depicts Sts. Constantine and his mother Helena who found the True Cross in the fourth century).

The office remained a bishopric until it 1165 when Metropolitan Kirill raised Ilya to the archiepiscopal dignity. Formally, though the status of the Novgorodian church remained unchanged and was still part of the Province of Kiev. While a number of archbishoprics in the Orthodox Church were autocephalous, answerable to the regional patriarch rather than the local metropolitan, Novgorod's was merely a titular archbishopric and always remained subordinate to the Province of Kiev and later Moscow. Indeed, in letters from the Patriarch of Constantinople, it was always referred to as a bishopric, and there are a number of letters reminding sometimes recalcitrant archbishops of their subservience to the Russian metropolitan. Around 1400, the archbishops began referring to themselves as "Archbishop of Novgorod the Great and Pskov." In 1156, Bishop Arkadii (1156-1165) was elected by the veche (public assembly) because the metropolitan throne in Kiev was vacant at that time. Over the next several centuries, a process of local election either by the veche, by the local clergy, or by the drawing of lots developed. It was last used in the election of Archbishop Sergei in 1483, the first Muscovite archbishop of Novgorod. This local election gave the archbishops considerable autonomy in church matters, although they were consecrated by the local metropolitan and maintained ties to the Russian church throughout this period.

While some Russian chronicles refer to all Novgorodian prelates as archbishops, the office was not formally raised to the archiepiscopal status until 1165. There is evidence, however, that suggests that Nifont (r. 1130-1156) held the archiepiscopal title personally even before that. An antimins (embroidered communion cloth) from the St. Nicholas Cathedral on the Market bears an inscription referring to Nifont as archbishop. After the creation of the archiepiscopate, Martirii appears to have been the only one (before the creation of the metropolitanate in 1589) not to have been an archbishop, as none of his seals found in archaeological excavations speak of him as anything other than "bishop".

Politically the archbishop of Novgorod grew in power during Novgorod's period of independence, traditionally 1136 to 1478, until just before the Mongol Invasion (1237-1240) and then fell into decline until about the archiepiscopate of Vasilii Kalika (1330-1352). It then continued to grow in power into the early fifteenth century. During this time, the archbishops carried out a number of important political functions: they headed embassies to bring peace and ransom captives, they patronized civil (as opposed to ecclesiastical) construction projects such as the Detinets (Kremlin) in Novgorod, the fortress at Orekhov (also known as Oreshek) that was rebuilt in stone by Vasilii Kalika in 1352, the city walls built around Novgorod in the 1330s, and so forth. They administered the ecclesiastical courts, which in Novgorod adjudicated cases that elsewhere in the Orthodox world were left to secular courts; they signed treaties on behalf of the city; they oversaw standards of weights and measures in the city marketplace; their vicars may have administered outlying districts, such as Staraya Ladoga; and they generally shared decision-making with the boyars who ran the city.

== The Muscovite period ==
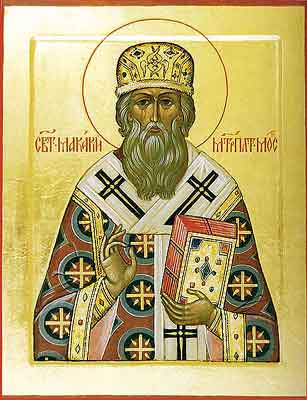
Metropolitan Macarius of Moscow, who prior to his metropolitanate, was archbishop of Novgorod.

After the Muscovite conquest in 1470-1478, the office fell somewhat into decline. The first three Muscovite archbishops were removed in disgrace, although the second one, Gennady (1484-1504), successfully suppressed the Judaizer Heresy (called the Zhidovstvuyuschiye in Russian) and compiled the first complete corpus of the Bible in Slavonic (the Gennady Bible, now housed in the State Historical Museum). His successor, Serapion was removed from office after only three years and the see sat vacant for seventeen years (1509-1526).

The office revived somewhat under Makarii (archbishop 1526-1542; Metropolitan of Moscow and All Rus' 1542-1563), who built a number of churches in the city, patronized the writing of saints' lives, and began a number of important literary works in Novgorod, which he completed in Moscow. Most notably among these are the Velikie Mineia Chet'ii (The Great Menion Reader), a twelve volume series of saints' lives and prayers divide up by months; and the Stepennaia Kniga (The Book of Degrees of Royal Genealogy), a genealogy of the tsar and his ancestors linking them to the Romans.

Like the rest of Russia, the archiepiscopal office suffered hardship during the reign of Ivan the Terrible and the subsequent Time of Troubles. Novgorod seems to have suffered more than most, as the oprichniks killed many citizens in 1570 and looted the Cathedral of Holy Wisdom and other places in the city (Massacre of Novgorod). At around the time of the massacre, Tsar Ivan the Terrible removed Archbishop Pimen from office and sent him to Aleksandrov where he was apparently tortured. Pimen died in 1572 under uncertain circumstances in the Monastery of St. Nicholas in Tula. His successor, Archbishop Leonid, was beheaded in Moscow on Cathedral Square in the Kremlin on the orders of the Tsar in October 1575. Leonid's successor, Aleksandr, was elevated to the metropolitan rank in 1589, becoming the "Metropolitan of Novgorod the Great and Velikie Luki". (Pskov became its own eparchy in 1589, hence Pskov could no longer be part of the Novgorodian archbishop's title.)

During the Time of Troubles, Novgorod was occupied by the Swedes, and Novgorodian Metropolitan Isidor played a key role in negotiating the city's hand over to the Swedes in 1611 and in administering the city under Swedish occupation. The city was not returned to Russia until several years after the establishment of the Romanov Dynasty, and Tsar Mikhail is said to have distrusted Isidor for his role in the city under Swedish control.

== The Imperial Period ==
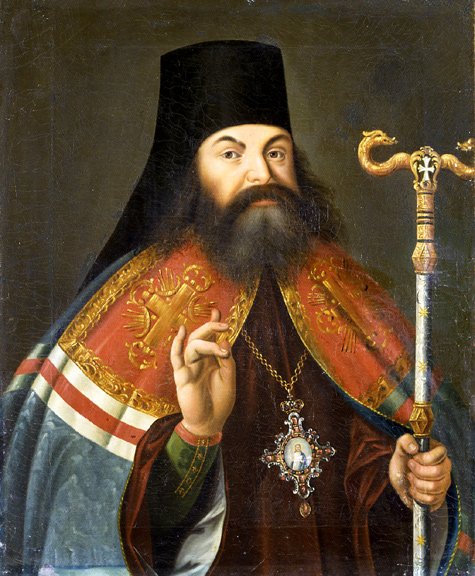
Feofan Prokopovich, who authored the Spiritual Regulations and helped set up the Holy Governing Synod, was later Archbishop of Novgorod.

The office remained a metropolitanate until 1720 when it was again reduced to an archiepiscopate. It was elevated to the metropolitan level again in 1762, and the title changed as the eparchy was included with St. Petersburg and later Finland and Estonia. It was separated from St. Petersburg in 1892.

The new city of St. Petersburg, when it was founded in late spring 1703, was initially in the Novgorodian Eparchy, and Metropolitan Iov consecrated the first wooden Peter and Paul Cathedral in the Peter and Paul Fortress (the current cathedral is, of course, a later construction) in April 1704.

Iov's vicar, Feofan Prokopovich, became one of Peter the Great's key advisors on religion and helped establish the Spiritual Regulations and the Holy Governing Synod (which governed the church from 1721 to 1917). Prokopovich was named Archbishop of Novgorod in 1725, after Peter's death.

Archbishop Dmitry (r. 1757-1767) served as Catherine the Great's spiritual advisor for the first few years of her reign and crowned her Empress in 1762.

== Soviet and Post-Soviet Period ==
The Novgorodian Eparchy was combined again with Leningrad after the re-legalization of the church in 1943. It was briefly separated in the 1950s and combined with Leningrad again in the 1960s. It was last separated in 1990, when it was recreated as a bishopric. It was raised to archiepiscopal level again in 1995. The current title is "Archbishop of Novgorod the Great and Staraya Russa".

From 1922-1936, thirteen bishops of Novgorod were named by the Living Church, or Renovationist Church, a movement (now deemed schismatic) that was sponsored by the Soviet authorities to split and thus weaken the Russian Church. The last of these, Veniamin Molchanov, was later Archbishop of Alma-Ata, but nothing further is known of him after October 1936. He is thought to have been shot. The Renovationists fought with the patriarchal or main Orthodox Church before they were suppressed when the patriarchal church was legalized in 1943.

In the patriarchal church, Archbishop Arsenius (Stadnitsky) was one of the candidates for Patriarch in the 1917 Moscow Council, when Tikhon was elected. He like many of the hierarchs of the church, suffered repeated arrest in the 1920s. He was exiled to Central Asia in 1926 and made Bishop of Tashkent in 1933, where he died in 1936. A plaque on the old bishop's palace in Novgorod commemorates him and there is a festival in his honor in Novgorod today. During his long, absentee tenure as Archbishop and Metropolitan of Novgorod, the eparchy was administered by a number of vicars, including Alexius Simansky, who held the title of Archbishop of Khutyn. Alexius was briefly Metropolitan of Novgorod in 1933 and was succeeded by Venedikt, who was shot in 1937 either in Kazan or in Leningrad, although the sources conflict. After Venedict, Alexius was made Metropolitan of Leningrad and Novgorod in 1943. He was one of the three bishops (of four still alive) who met with Stalin on September 4, 1943, a meeting which led to the re-legalisiation of the Russian Orthodox Church. In 1945, Alexius was elected Patriarch of Moscow and All Rus and served in that post (the longest-serving Moscow patriarch) until his death in 1970.

Patriarch Alexius II, the most recent Patriarch of Moscow and All Rus was Metropolitan of Leningrad and Novgorod immediately before his election as Patriarch in 1990. As patriarch, Alexius II presided over the reestablishment of Novgorod as an eparchy independent of Leningrad/St. Petersburg and of the reconsecration of the Cathedral of Holy Wisdom.

The current bishop is Metropolitan Lev. He was transferred from Tashkent in 1990 to be bishop of Novgorod and raised to archiepiscopal dignity in 1995, and to the metropolitan dignity in 2012. He has overseen the reopening of a number of churches in Novgorod and the eparchy, the return of the Cathedral of Holy Wisdom to the Russian Orthodox Church, the opening of a seminary at the Zverin Monastery just north of the old city walls on the left bank of the Volkhov River, the reestablishment of a library in the Cathedral of Holy Wisdom, and other activities in the aftermath of the Soviet persecution of the church. He has received several awards from the church and the Russian government for his activities.

== See also ==
- List of bishops and archbishops of Novgorod
