= Novgorod Theological Seminary =

- Новгородская духовная семинария
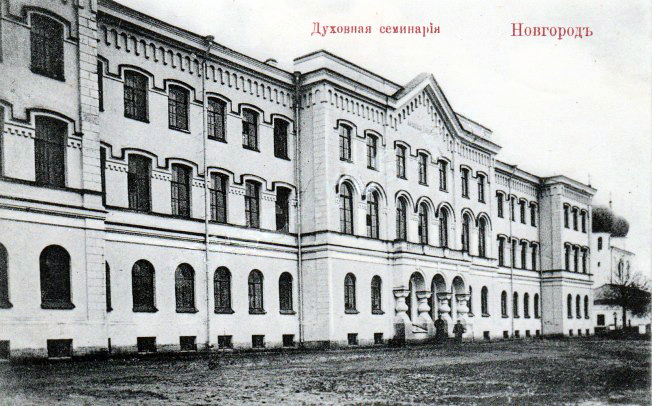
- Active: 1706–1918
- Location: Novgorod, Russia
- Language: Russian

The Novgorod Theological Seminary (Russian: Новгородская духовная семинария) was a secondary theological educational institution of the Novgorod diocese of the Russian Orthodox Church, which existed in 1740–1918.

== History ==
In 1706, Metropolitan Job of Novgorod opened the Novgorod Greek-Slavonic School at his bishop's house and summoned the exiled Greek scholars brothers Joannicius and Sophronius Likhud, whom he met while living in Moscow, to lead it. At the expense of the funds of the St. Sophia Cathedral, he organized the construction of a two-story building for the school; the students, who numbered up to 153 people, were kept at the expense of the metropolitan, who put his book collection at their disposal. The Novgorod school was an attempt to create an Orthodox educational institution based on the patristic tradition, and not intended for scholastic disputes. Latin was not taught here at all. With the appointment of Theophan Prokopovich as archbishop in Novgorod, these Novgorod schools were abolished. In the 1730s, a number of bishops' schools were transformed into seminaries as a result of the introduction of the Latin curriculum.

A document drawn up in the Holy Synod, apparently with the participation of Ambrose himself, approved by the Decree of Empress Anna Ioannovna of May 24, 1740, reads: grammar even to rhetoric, philosophy and theology...”. By decree of October 30 (November 10), 1740, Archbishop Ambrose determined to open a seminary in the Antoniev Monastery, closest to Novgorod. According to the staff, the activities of the Novgorod City Palace of Culture were regulated in detail from the very beginning and provided financially. 7,859 rubles 37 kopecks per year were allocated for its maintenance, which far exceeded the financial support of other seminaries. According to the funds allocated for its maintenance, it left other seminaries far behind, that is, it was actually a higher educational institution, although it did not bear the name "academy". For example, in 1765, when the Novgorod Theological Seminary had a staffing of 8,285 rubles, the Moscow Theological Academy received 4,847 rubles, the Trinity Seminary - 4,901 rubles, and other seminaries - much less. Apart from the Novgorod Seminary, only the St. Petersburg Seminary had a staff salary.

The first students of the seminary were 100 best students of the school at the bishop's house, which for some time remained preparatory for the seminary. With regard to the organization of education, the seminary was almost an exact copy of the Kiev Theological Academy, whose graduate was Archbishop Ambrose. Initially, there were four classes in the seminary. Первоначально в семинарии было четыре класса: analogies, infims, grammars, syntaxes.

Severe discipline was the basis of seminary education. For violation of the established rules, they were subjected to cruel punishments, up to whips and shackles. Flight from the seminary was common: in 1748 there were 94 on the run.

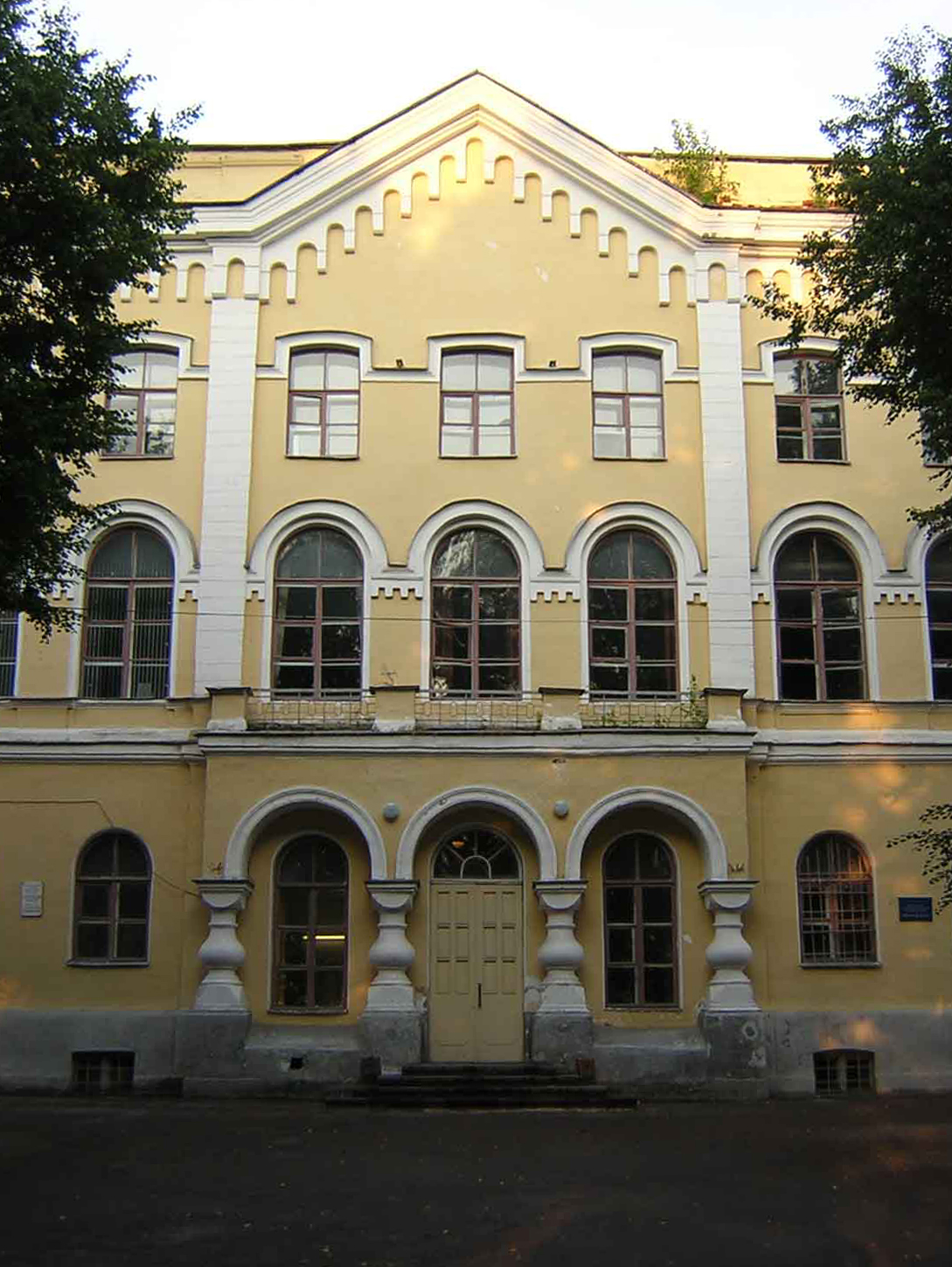
The building of the former Theological Seminary in the Anthony Monastery

Archbishop Ambrose (Yushkevich) obtained permission from Empress Elizaveta Petrovna to transfer Theophan Prokopovich's library to the Novgorod Theological Seminary, for which he decided to build a stone building. However, the construction of the building began only in 1759 and was completed in the 1780s according to the estimates of the provincial architect Vasily Polivanov. A two-storey building with two side risalits and elegant facades has been well preserved in the eastern part of the monastery; now it houses the library of the Yaroslav-the-Wise Novgorod State University.

The library of the Novgorod Theological Seminary is one of the oldest Russian libraries. Money was allocated annually for the purchase of new books, this made it possible to create the richest book fund. G.I. Svetlov in the book “A Brief Essay on the History of the Novgorod Theological Seminary”, published in 1917, reports that the library of Ambrose Yushkevich “formed the basis of that rich book depository, which, having given part of its treasures, and even the best, to the St. Petersburg Theological Academy, should be considered now the best and the largest of the existing theological seminaries. It also included the library of the Likhudov school. A larger number of books, according to the catalog of 1779 (the earliest known catalog of the library), in the middle of the 18th century was only in the library of the Imperial Academy of Sciences in St. Petersburg. T

In 1788–1800, the status of the Novgorod Seminary was reduced to the level of a four-class one.

During the 19th century, changes took place in the life of the Novgorod Seminary. The severity and severity of the bursa of the 18th - early 19th centuries gave way to a humane attitude towards students.

For the 150th anniversary of the seminary, under the rector, Archpriest Evgraf Megorsky, a new large building was built with a front facade on the Volkhov. The celebration of the anniversary took place on October 30, 1890, it was headed by Bishop Vladimir Bogoyavlensky.

At the end of April 1918, the educational activities of the Novgorod Theological Seminary actually ceased. On September 30, 1918, the Novgorod provincial department of public education decided to close the Novgorod Theological Seminary, and on October 1, 1919, the Novgorod Institute of Public Education was opened on its basis, which ended up with the fundamental library of the seminary. In 1920, the Anthony Monastery was abolished.
