= Novgorod State Pedagogical Institute =

Russian higher education institution

- Новгородский государственный педагогический институт
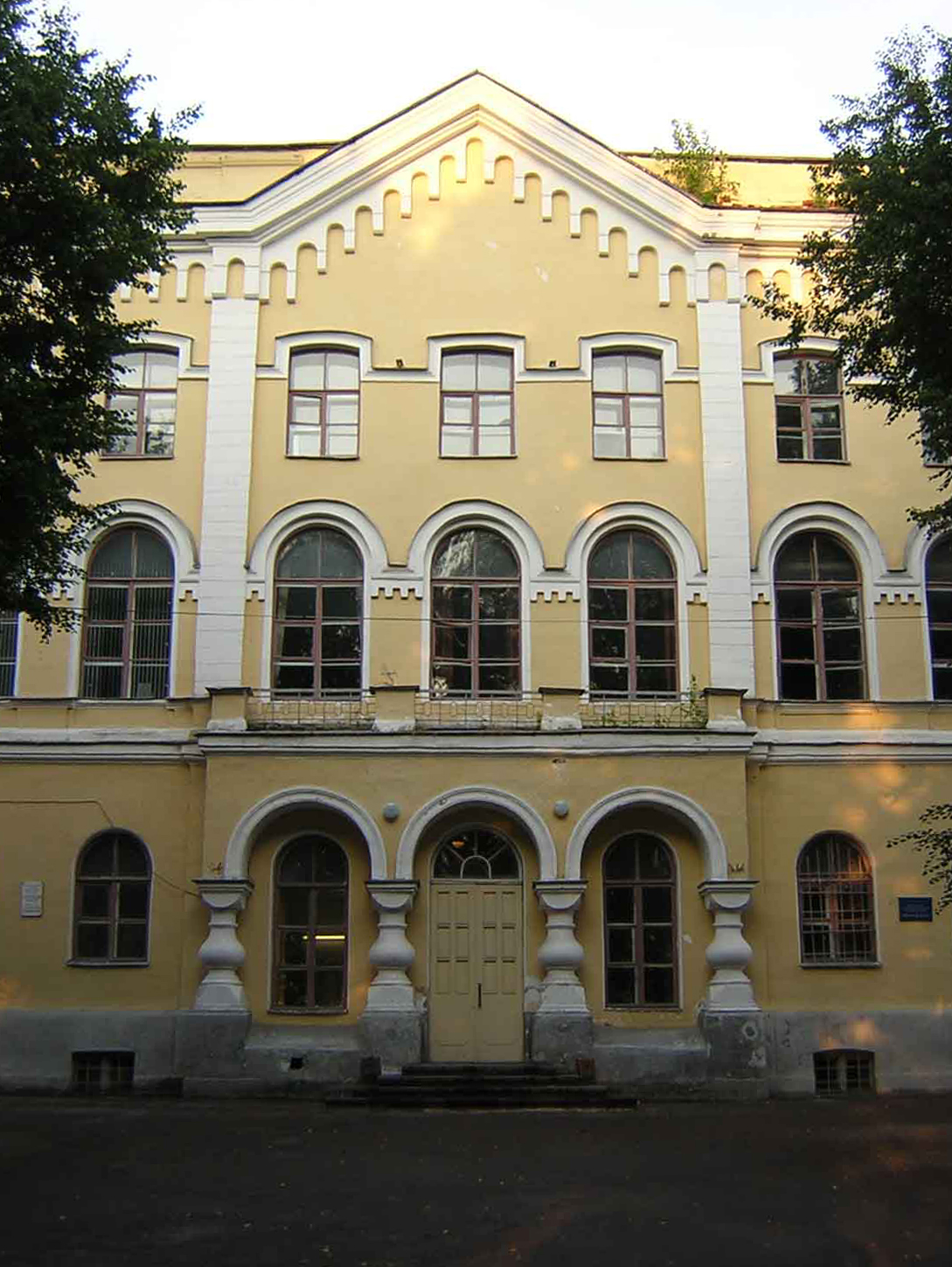
- Entrance to the building of the former Theological Seminary, where the main building of the Pedagogical Institute was located
- Active: 1953–1993
- Location: Veliky Novgorod, Russia
- Language: Russian

University rankings

Regional – Overall
- QS Emerging Europe and Central Asia: 401-450 (2022)

The Novgorod State Pedagogical Institute (Russian: Новгородский государственный педагогический институт) is a higher educational institution that existed in Veliky Novgorod in 1953–1993. Became part of the Yaroslav-the-Wise Novgorod State University.

== History ==
In 1740, the Theological Seminary was opened at the Novgorod Antoniev Monastery. After 1917, the Novgorod Institute of Public Education was opened on the premises of the seminary, which in 1934 was transformed into the Novgorod State Teachers' Institute, and then, in 1953, into the Novgorod State Pedagogical Institute.

== Rectors ==
- N. M. Karpenko (1952–1955)
- V. Z. Dzhincharadze (1955–1957)
- Vladimir Ivanovich Bragin (1957–1959)
- I. I. Kostikov (1959–1963)
- Alexander Sergeevich Panichev (1964–1972)
- Mikhail Ivanovich Kulikov (1972–1985)
- Pyotr Vasilyevich Volkov (1985–1988)
- Nikolai Gavrilovich Bindyukov (1988–1993)

== Literature ==
- Ковалёв, Н. Е.; Жаров, Т. К.; Грибов, В. С. (1975). Педагогические институты. Vol. 19.
- Секретарь Л. А. Новгородский Антониев Монастырь. Исторические очерки / Л. А. Секретарь; Новгородский государственный университет имени Ярослава Мудрого. 2-е изд., испр. и доп. — Великий Новгород, 2021. — 340 с.: ил. — С. 249–300. — ISBN 978-5-89896-742-0
- Новгородский государственный университет имени Ярослава Мудрого. 20 лет. Великий Новгород: Меценатъ. 2013. pp. 23–25.

== Links ==
- "Практический институт народного образования — педагогический техникум. 1919—1923 гr" (Музей истории НовГУ ed.). Великий Новгород: Yaroslav-the-Wise Novgorod State University. 2005.
- "Новгородский государственный учительский институт (НГУИ), 1934—1953 гг" (Музей истории НовГУ ed.). Великий Новгород: Yaroslav-the-Wise Novgorod State University. 2005.
- "Новгородский государственный педагогический институт (НГПИ), 1953—1993 гг" (Музей истории НовГУ ed.). Великий Новгород: Yaroslav-the-Wise Novgorod State University. 2005.
