= Institute of Agriculture and Natural Resources =

Institute of Agriculture and Natural Resources is the name of multiple institutions including:

- Institute of Agriculture and Natural Resources, University of Nebraska–Lincoln
- Institute of Agriculture and Natural Resources, Yaroslav-the-Wise Novgorod State University

- see Yaroslav-the-Wise Novgorod State University § Institute of Agriculture and Natural Resources
