= Kirik the Novgorodian =

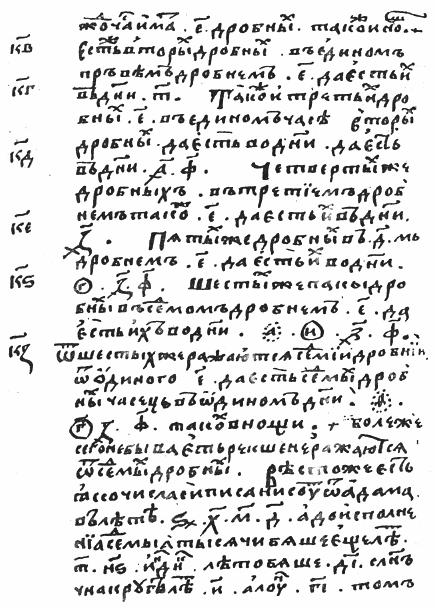
A page from Kirik's Teaching on Numbers

Kirik the Novgorodian (Russian: Кирик Новгородец, romanized: Kirik Novgorodets; 1110 – after 1158) was a monk of the Antoniev Monastery and later a hieromonk in the entourage of Archbishop Niphont of Novgorod (r. 1130–1156) famous for writing the first mathematical treatise in Eastern Slavdom, the Uchenie o chislakh (Russian: Учение о числах, "Teaching on Numbers"); he also wrote entries in the Novgorod First Chronicle in the 1140s and asked some of the 152 questions of Niphont in a theological work known as the Voproshanie Kirika (Russian: Вопрошание Кирика, Вопрошание Кириково, "The Questions of Kirik"). He also translated the works of Patriarch Nikephoros I of Constantinople as well as the Pentateuch.

Kirik (a form of the name Kirill) wrote in the Uchenie o Chislakh (in full, Uchenie im zha vedati cheloveku chisla vsekh let), that "my birthday was 26 years before now, that is 312 months, 1,300 weeks, and 9,500 without three days." Since the Uchenie is dated to 1136, his birth year would have been 1110. He is thought to be the chronicler who referred to his own ordination in the Novgorod First Chronicle under the year 1144, and to have survived Nifont (who died in Kiev in 1156), as he is thought to have written the chronicle entry in which he said that Nifont had been accused of fleeing to Novgorod after looting the archiepiscopal treasury, but defended the archbishop, asking "about this each one of us should reflect: which bishop adorned St. Sophia, painted the porches, made an icon case, and adorned the whole outside, and in Pskov erected a stone church to the Holy Savior and another in Ladoga to St. Clement?".
