= Novgorod State Polytechnic Institute =

- Новгородский государственный политехнический институт
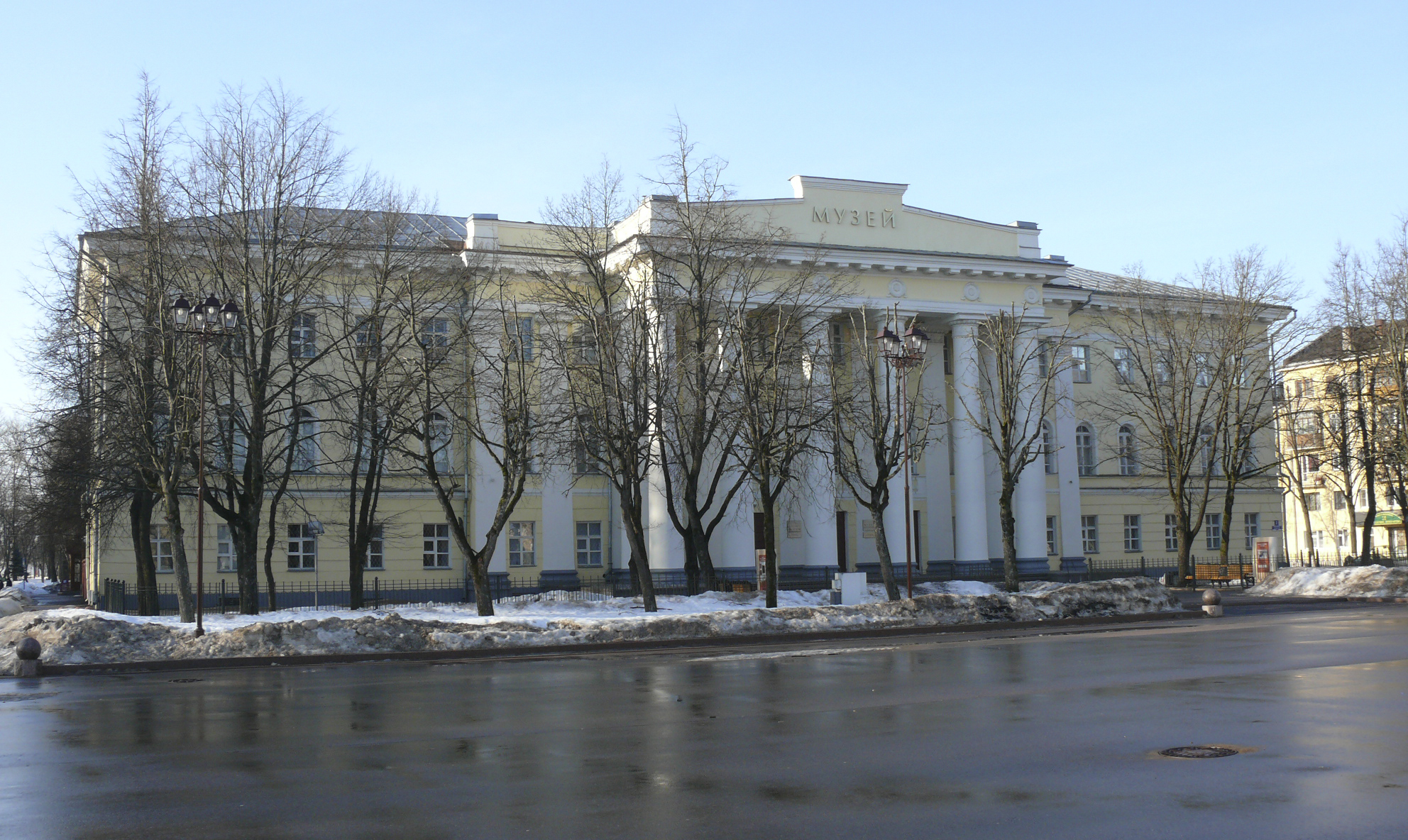
- Established: 1961
- Location: Veliky Novgorod, Russia
- Language: Russian

Novgorod State Polytechnic Institute (Russian: Новгородский государственный политехнический институт) was a Higher education institution in Veliky Novgorod, founded in 1961 to train engineering and technical personnel. On 30th of June 1993 it was merged to create the Novgorod State University.

== History ==
On June 23, 1961, at the initiative of the rector of the Leningrad Electrotechnical Institute named after V.I. Lenin, Professor N.P. Bogoroditsky and in accordance with the Order of the Minister of Higher and Secondary Specialized Education of the RSFSR V.N. Stoletov under No. 414, the evening general technical faculty of LETI named after V. I. Lenin, created for the training of highly qualified engineering personnel.

On May 12, 1964, by Order of the Minister of Higher and Secondary Specialized Education of the RSFSR No. 330, the evening general technical faculty was reorganized into the Novgorod branch of the Lenin Leningrad Electrotechnical Institute. A. M. Kisilev was appointed the first director of the branch. Three faculties were included in the structure of the branch: full-time, evening and correspondence, in 1973 the Faculty of Mechanics and Technology was established. The branch began to train specialists in three specialties: "Radio Engineering", "Design and Production of Radio Equipment" and "Semiconductor Devices", later three more specialties were added to them: Mechanical Engineering Technology, Automobiles and Automobile Economy and "Machines and Technology of Metal Forming "and" Engineering Technology ". In addition to their teaching staff, teachers from LETI named after V. I. Lenin were invited: professors Yu. M. Kazarinov, V. V. Pasynkov and V. I. Smirnov. The total number of students in 1966 was 450 people, of which: correspondence and evening department - 250 people, full-time department - 200 people. By 1972, about 1,500 people were studying in the branch, the enrollment for the first year was six hundred and fifty people, and the annual graduation of engineers was about two hundred people.

On June 15, 1973, by Decree of the Council of Ministers of the USSR No. 412, the Novgorod State Polytechnic Institute was established on the basis of the Nizhny Novgorod branch of the Lenin Leningrad Electrotechnical Institute. From 1973 to 1993, the structure of the institute included dozens of general institute departments and seven faculties: mechanical and technological, electronic engineering, radio electronics, radio engineering, automotive, civil engineering and architecture, arts and construction. Yu. A. Polyakov was appointed the first rector of the institute. In 1974, the institute became the base institution of higher education in the Northwestern zonal sector for research work. In 1984, by order of the Minister of Higher and Secondary Specialized Education of the RSFSR, postgraduate studies were opened at the institute in seven specialties. In 1990, the Institute opened a Specialized Council for the awarding of scientific degrees of candidate of technical sciences and doctor of technical sciences. Novgorod State Polytechnic Institute cooperated with polytechnic institutes of Czechoslovakia, Bulgaria and Poland.

On June 30, 1993, by the Decree of the Government of the Russian Federation, Novgorod State University was established on the basis of the Novgorod State Polytechnic Institute.

== Institute building ==
In 1961, the faculty was given the building of the former Assembly of Nobility on Victory Square - Sofiyskaya 2, built in 1853 according to the project of architect Andrei Stackenschneider. From 1952 to 1956, a reconstruction was carried out under the guidance of architect Ilya Iosifovich Kushnir.

== Management ==
- Polyakov, Yuri Andreevich (1973–1977)
- Radtsig, Yuri Yurievich (1977–1982)
- Soroka, Vladimir Vasilyevich (1982–1993)

== Notable teachers ==
- Lev Vekker
- Volodin, Eduard Fedorovich

== Notable graduates ==
- Ochin, Oleg Fedorovich - Deputy of the State Duma of the first convocation

== Literature ==
- Инженерное образование в Великом Новгороде, 1961—1993: сборник / Федер. агентство по образованию, Новгородский гос. ун-т им. Ярослава Мудрого; сост. Б. И. Селезнев. - Великий Новгород : Новгородский гос. ун-т, 2009. — 95 с.
- Наши будущие инженеры. Первый технический вуз в Новгороде / Новгородская правда // Новгород: 1961.
- Кузница инженеров / Новгородская правда // Новгород: 1964.
- Новгородский политехнический институт / Новгородские ведомости // Новгород: 1992. — No. 68.

== Sources ==
- "Золотой юбилей Политеха". Новгородские ведомости.
