= Anthony of Rome =

Medieval Russian saint (died 1147)

Saint Anthony of Rome
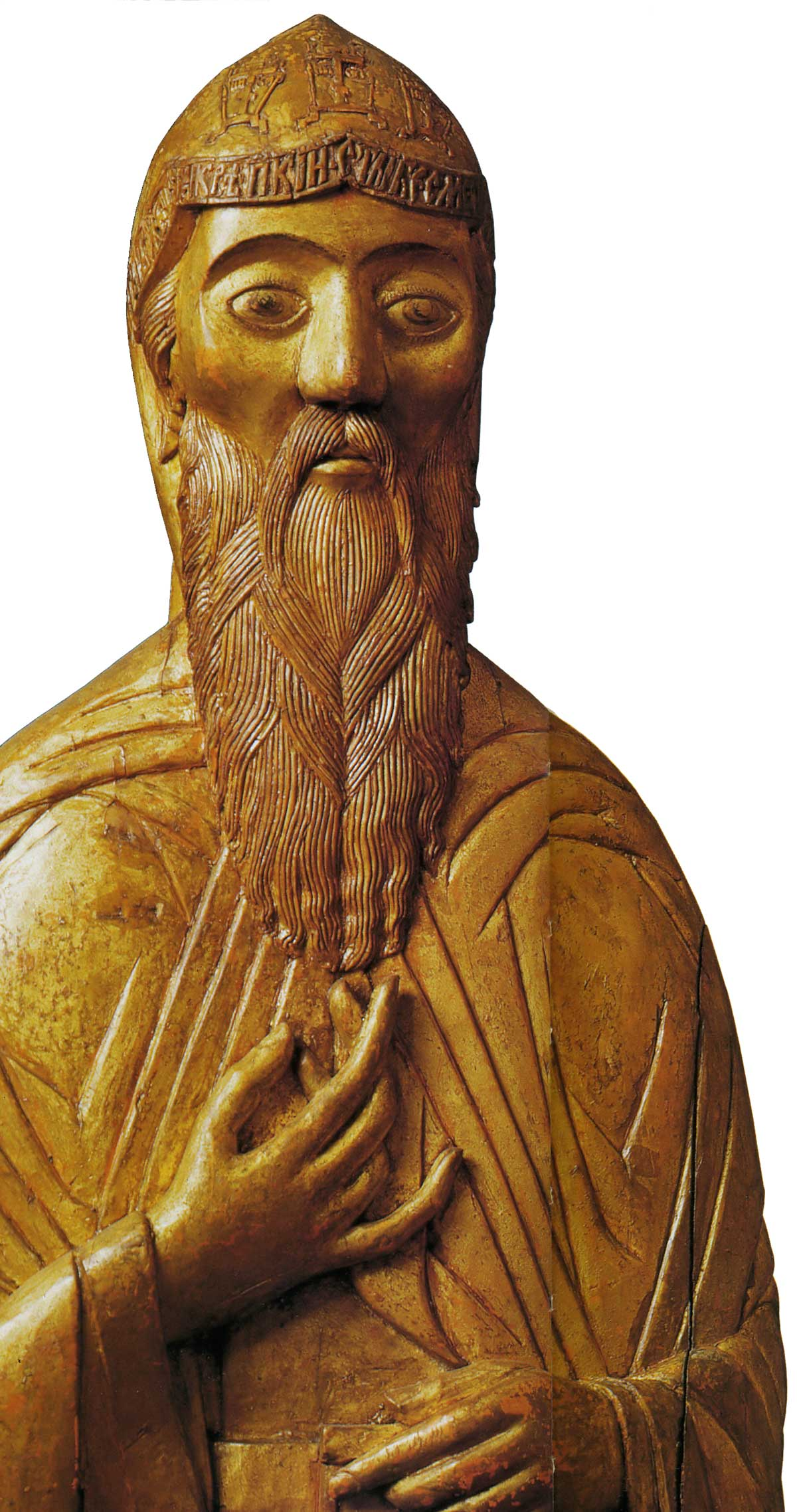
- Lid of the shrine of Anthony of Rome, 1573
- Born: c. 1067; Rome
- Died: 3 August 1147; Novgorod
- Venerated in: Eastern Orthodox Church
- Feast: 3 August; 17 January

Anthony of Rome or Anthony the Roman (Russian: Антоний Римлянин, romanized: Antony Rimlyanin; 1067 – 3 August 1147) was the founder of the Antoniev Monastery in Novgorod, Russia. He was canonized as a saint by the Russian Orthodox Church.

== Background ==
The hagiographic account on the life of Saint Anthony of Rome is only known since the second half of the 16th century. It claims that Anthony was born in Rome in 1067 to a Greek Orthodox family, and became a monk there. After the persecution of Eastern Orthodox believers started, he left the city and made a home at the seashore, and according to his legend, a storm started which lifted the stone on which he was praying, which carried him to a shore near the Russian city of Novgorod. Anthony, who did not speak Russian, was informed by a Greek merchant that he was in Novgorod, met with Nikita, the bishop of Novgorod, and obtained a permission to found the monastery at the site his stone arrived to the shore.

It has been reported that the monastery church was consecrated by Anthony not in 1119, but that he was made hegumen only in 1131–1132, immediately after Niphont was installed as the bishop of Novgorod. This long delay is unclear; presumably it was related to some frictions between Novgorodian church hierarchs. Anthony died on 3 August 1147 and was buried in the monastery.

Since 1597, Anthony is venerated as a saint by the Russian Orthodox Church. The feast days are 17 January and 3 August.

== Sources ==
- "Антонии, святые русские" . Brockhaus and Efron Encyclopedic Dictionary (in Russian). 1906.
- Nazarenko, A. V. (2001). "Антоний Римлянин". Православная энциклопедия. Т. II: Алексий, человек Божий — Анфим Анхиальский. Moscow: Православная энциклопедия. pp. 675–677. ISBN 5-89572-007-2.
- Tradigo, Alfredo (2006). Icons and Saints of the Eastern Orthodox Church. Getty Publications. ISBN 978-0-89236-845-7.
