= Niphont of Novgorod =

Archbishop of Novgorod

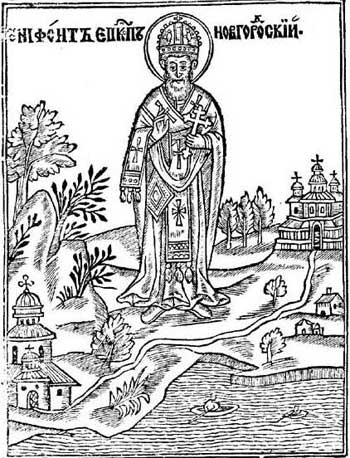

Nifont (Russian: Нифонт) was Archbishop of Novgorod from 1130 to 1156, the first prelate of Novgorod the Great to hold that title, though it appears the title was held personally and did not extend to the office until 1165. During his tenure, the prince of Novgorod was first dismissed and "shown the road," beginning Novgorod's period of independence in 1136 which was to last until 1478.

Nifont was the first Novgorodian bishop to carry out extensive building projects. He built the Church of the Assumption in the Marketplace (the current building is a fifteenth-century reconstruction carried out under the auspices of Archbishop Gennady). He was also the patron of the Church of the Transfiguration in the Mirozhsky Monastery in Pskov, said to have been built in a Greek style according to Nifont's tastes; twelfth-century frescoes were recently uncovered there.

In the first year of his tenure, Nifont appointed Anthony of Rome the hegumen of the Antoniev Monastery, which Anthony himself founded before 1108.
