= Yaroslav-the-Wise Novgorod State University =

The Yaroslav-the-Wise Novgorod State University
- Type: Public
- Established: 1993
- Rector: Prof., Dr. Yuri Borovikov
- Faculty: 1080
- Students: ~10,000
- Location: Veliky Novgorod, Russia; 58.5417°N 31.2614°E
- Website: http://www.novsu.ru (English version) Building details
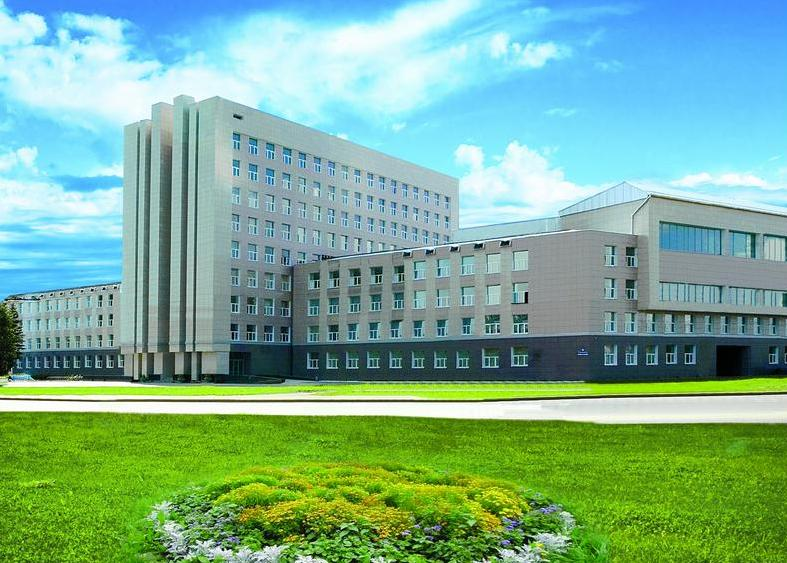
- NovSu Main Campus Bolshaya Sankt Peterburgskaya 41, Velikiy Novgorod

University rankings

Regional – Overall
- QS Emerging Europe and Central Asia: 401-450 (2022)

The Yaroslav-the-Wise Novgorod State University (orig. Новгородский Государственный Университет имени Ярослава Мудрого, НовГУ), also known informally as NovSU, was founded in 1993 by merging the two oldest higher education institutions of Veliky Novgorod: the Pedagogical and Polytechnic Institutes. Later, Novgorod Agricultural Academy was included into the structure of the university. At present it comprises seven Institutes and four Colleges of secondary vocational education.

It is unusual that the Novgorod State University has the name of Prince Yaroslav the Wise incorporated into its title. On the eve of the university's first anniversary, the Prince's personal seal was discovered during archaeological excavations. Academician Yanin considered it a remarkable coincidence and suggested awarding the university the name of the Russian prince.

== Higher education in Novgorod in the 18th–20th centuries ==
The first attempt to open a higher educational institution in Novgorod dates back to 1740, when the Novgorodian Archbishop Ambrose (Yushkevich) founded the Novgorod Theological Seminary. As a graduate of the Kiev-Mohyla Academy, Archbishop Ambrose planned to create an exact copy of his alma mater in Novgorod. From the very beginning, the activities of the Novgorod Theological Seminary were thoroughly regulated and properly funded (7859 rubles 37 kopecks per year were allocated for its maintenance). This amount of money was much higher than the financial support of other seminaries in the Russian Empire at that time. On April 12, 1741, he sent a report to the regent Anna Leopoldovna, declaring his intention to build "not a seminary, but a large Academy following the example of the Kiev schools ... [at] the monastery of Anthony of Rome", where "should be 10 schools according to the state, also a stone library for keeping books, and for better order and observation of this Academy... archimandrite and rector ... following the example of the Kiev and Moscow Academies", and also asked "to approve this academy with a privilege (certificate), following the example of Kiev, Kharkov and other foreign academies". The curriculum had the same structure as in the Kiev Academy. The first teachers were invited also from there.

The academies of that time were not only designed to train clergymen. Their graduates became scientists, writers, officials, etc. The formalization of the clergy into a closed class and the reorientation of theological schools exclusively towards people from this class occurred later, during the reign of Catherine II.

Archbishop Ambrose made special efforts to organize the seminary library. In 1740, 300 rubles a year were allocated to equip the library. No seminary in the Russian Empire received such funding. Ambrose handed over the book collection of the Novgorod bishop's house to the seminary library, which included the library of the Novgorod school of Likhud Brothers, and also obtained permission from Empress Elizabeth Petrovna to transfer the library of Theophan (Prokopovich) to the seminary.

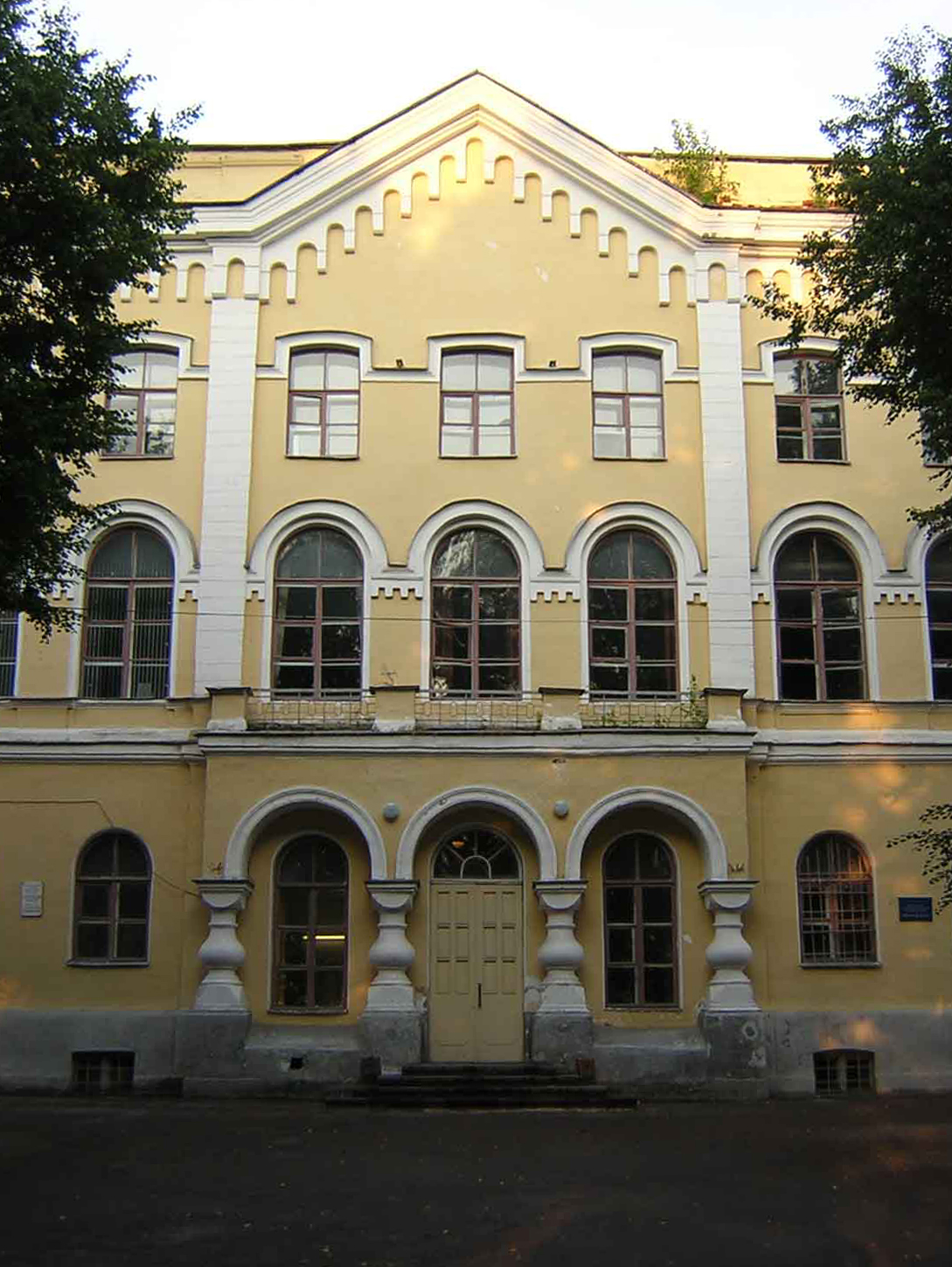
The building of the former Theological Seminary in the Antoniev Monastery

Ultimately, however, the main resources were directed to the development of education in St. Petersburg. So in 1788, the upper classes of the Novgorod Theological Seminary, on the initiative of Metropolitan Gabriel (Petrov) of Novgorod and St. Petersburg, were transferred to St. Petersburg for 11 years to raise the level of education in the Alexander Nevsky Seminary, which in 1797 was transformed into the Theological Academy. Thus, for all the subsequent tsarist times, neither a theological academy nor a secular university was opened in Novgorod. In the 19th century, the Novgorod Theological Seminary had few fundamental differences from other theological seminaries in the country. However, even then it possessed unique traditions and a remarkable library.

On September 30, 1918, the Novgorod government department of public education decided to close the Novgorod Theological Seminary, and on October 1, 1919, the Novgorod Institute of Public Education was opened on its basis. The fundamental library of the seminary was transferred to that institute.

In 1934, the Novgorod Institute of Public Education was transformed into the Novgorod State Teachers' Institute, and then, in 1953, into the Novgorod State Pedagogical Institute.

== Novgorod State University ==
On June 30, 1993, the Prime Minister V.S.Chernomyrdin signed the Resolution: "On the formation of the Novgorod State University" on the basis of the Novgorod State Polytechnic Institute and the Novgorod State Pedagogical Institute. The Minister of Education V. G. Kinelyov appointed Vladimir Vasilyevich Soroka as Rector of NovSU. The opening ceremony took place on October 1, 1993.

The purpose of foundation of NovSU was to combine the diverse experience of training specialists by conducting fundamental research and training at all levels of higher, postgraduate and additional education in a wide range of natural sciences, humanities and other areas of science, technology and culture.

On the eve of the celebration of the first university anniversary, at the Troizkiy excavation site in Novgorod, the lead seal of Prince Yaroslav the Wise was found, indicating that he, already being a Kiev prince, retained a direct influence on the development of Novgorod. At the suggestion of the head of the Novgorod archaeological expedition, academician V. L. Yanin, who was supported by the members of the Academic Council of Novgorod State University and the regional administration, the new university was named after Yaroslav the Wise in recognition of his merits.

On January 15, 1997, by order of the Government of the Russian Federation, based on the decision of the Academic Councils of the Novgorod State Agricultural Academy (NSAA) and Novgorod State University, the NSAA was incorporated into the university as a structural unit: the School of Agriculture and Natural Resources. The Faculty of Economics in the summer of the same year merged with the university faculties of economics and management, laying the foundation for the Institute of Economics and Management.

== Mission of the University ==
NovSU continues the political and educational mission of the Novgorod Prince Yaroslav-the-Wise and sees its destination in both the development of Russian education and science as well as in the interest of the individual, society and state, in glorification of Novgorod lands by learning and unity. Its objectives are to translate professional knowledge and experience, to implement humanistic ideals, and to build a social type of the individual adequate to the requirements of contemporary time. NovSU promotes cultural development of the regional community on a national, historical, spiritual and moral basis, while emphasizing the features and dynamics of "a learning university" on the latest organizational and technological basis.

== International Relations ==
Novgorod State University is engaged in a wide spectrum of international activities. NovSU cooperates with international foundations, foreign governmental and nongovernmental organizations, and universities from countries such as Belarus, Estonia, Finland, France, Germany, the Netherlands, Norway, Poland, Serbia, Sweden, Ukraine, and the United States.

== Education and institutes ==
More than 10,000 students study at the Novgorod State University. The academic staff of the NovSU consists of 1080 employees. Among them there are 188 doctors and 566 candidates.

Today 4 specialist degree programs, 42 undergraduate programs and 19 master's degree programs are offered at 20 faculties and 92 departments of the university.

=== Institute of Electronic and Information Systems ===
• Software of Computer Engineering and Automated Systems
• Applied Mathematics and Information Science
• Mathematics
• Physics
• Electronics and Micro-Electronics
• Radio Technology, including specialization Medical Electronics
• Design and Technology of Electronic Equipment
• Radio Physics and Electronics

=== Institute of Humanities ===
• History and Archivistics
• Theory and Methodology of Foreign Languages
• Translation Methodology
• Philosophy
• Cultural Studies
• Philology
• Journalism
• Law

=== Institute of Medical education ===
• General Medicine
• Nursing
• Dentistry
• Pharmacy

=== Institute of Continuous Pedagogical Education – Psychology ===
• Technological Education
• Pedagogics
• Foreign Languages
• Technology and Entrepreneurship
• Musical Education
• Fine Arts
• Preschool Pedagogics and Psychology
• Pedagogics and Methodology of Primary Education
• Logopedics
• Special Psychology
• Physical Training
• Management of Organization

=== Institute of Agriculture and Natural Resources ===
• Biology
• Geography
• Chemistry
• Ecology
• Forestry
• Agronomy
• Agricultural Mechanization
• Agricultural Manufacturing and Processing Technologies
• Veterinary

=== Institute of Digital Economics and Administration ===
• Management of Organization
• Marketing
• Human Resources Management
• State and Municipal Management
• Land Resources Management
• Accounting, Analysis and Audit
• Finances and Credit
• Economics and Enterprise Administration
• Commerce

=== Polytechnic Institute ===
• Тechnology, Equipment and Automation of Engineering Industry
• Technologies of Engineering Industry
• Automobile Transport
• Industrial Heat-and-Power Engineering
• Industrial and Civil Engineering
• Urban Construction and Municipal Services
• Technology of Art Materials Processing
• Machinery and Metal Pressure Processing Technology
• Architecture
• Design (Industrial, Fashion)
• Architectural Environment Design

== Duration of studies ==
5 years – specialties (except: 6 years – General Medicine and Design; 4 years – Nursing); 4 years – bachelor's degree; 2 years – master's degree; 3 years – postgraduate Studies.

== Department of Russian as a Foreign Language ==
Department of Russian as a Foreign Language offers both short and long-term courses in business and colloquial Russian for students or anyone who wishes to study the Russian language and culture.
