= Antoniev Monastery =

Coordinates: 58°32′21″N 31°17′22″E

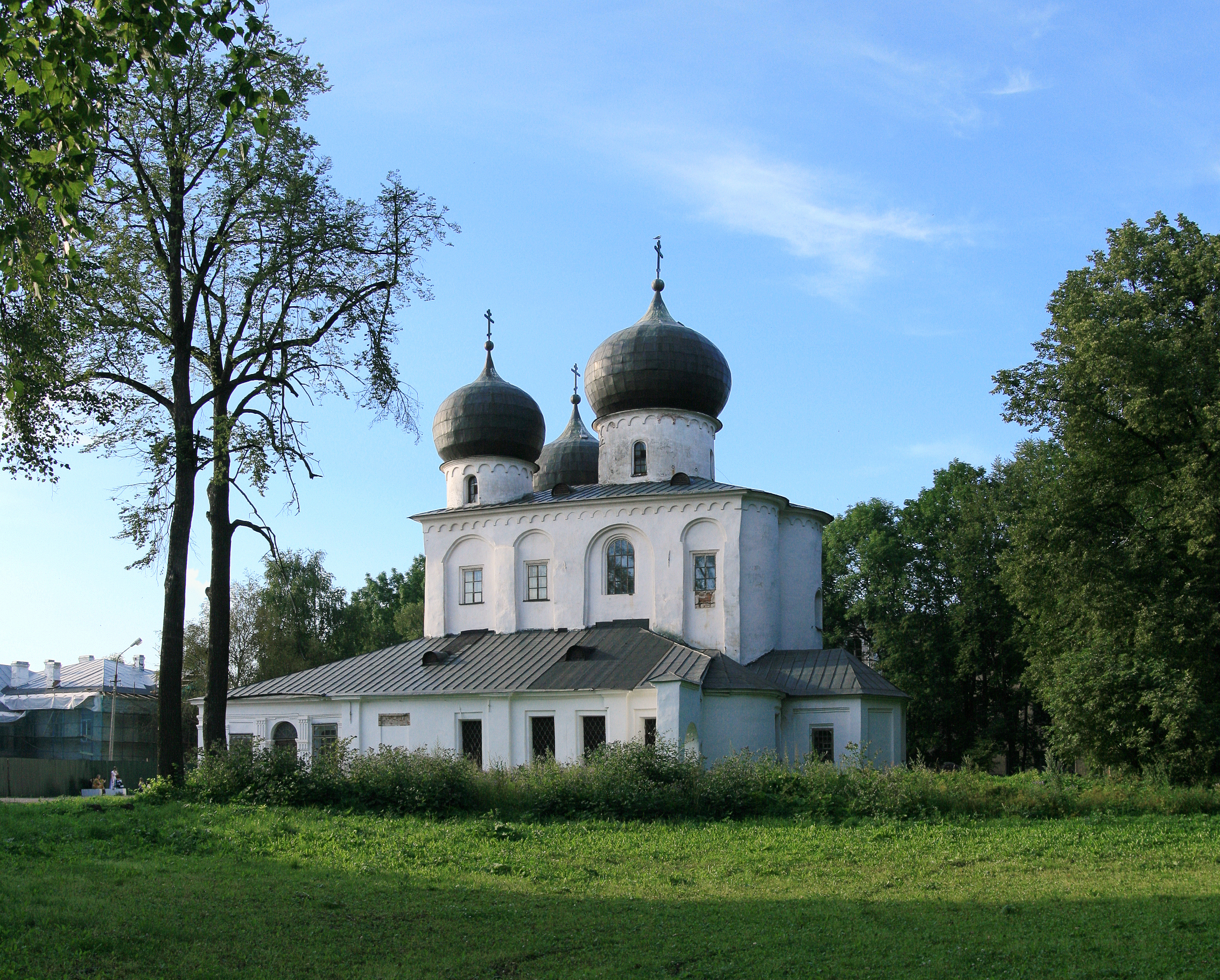
The Romanesque katholikon was consecrated in 1119 to the feast of the Nativity of God's Mother

The Antoniev Monastery ("St Anthony's Monastery", Russian: Антониев монастырь) rivalled the Yuriev Monastery as the most important monastery of medieval Novgorod the Great. It stands along the right bank of the Volkhov River north of the city centre and forms part of the Historic Monuments of Novgorod and Surroundings, a World Heritage Site.

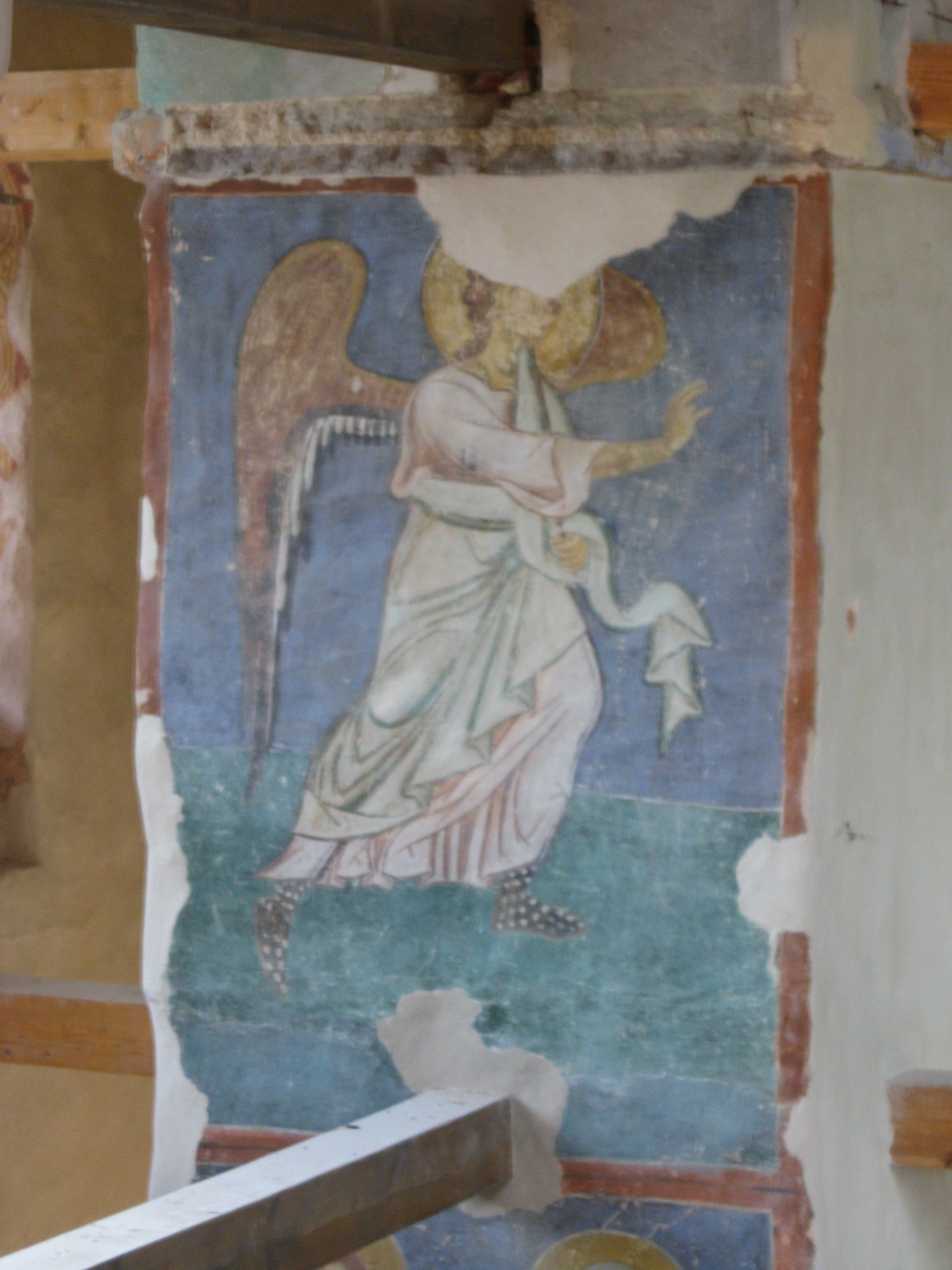
A fresco dating from 1125

The monastery was founded in 1117 by St Anthony of Rome, who, according to legend, flew to Novgorod from Rome on a rock (the alleged rock is now in the vestibule just to the right of the main door into the Church of the Nativity of the Mother of God beneath a fresco of Bishop Nikita of Novgorod). Anthony was consecrated hegumen of the monastery in 1131 by Archbishop Nifont (1130–1156) and was buried beneath a large slab to the right of the altar in the same church.

The Church of the Nativity of the Mother of God, like the Church of St. George in the Yuriev Monastery, is one of the few three-domed churches in Russia. It is also one of the few buildings in Russia which survived from the 12th century. It was founded by Anthony in 1117 and completed in 1119. There are some frescoes from the Middle Ages still extant, most notably in the apse, but most are from the sixteenth or seventeenth centuries and are in some disrepair.

Kirik the Novgorodian was a monk of the monastery famous for writing the first mathematical treatise in Eastern Slavdom, the "Teaching on Numbers", a theological work known as "The Questions of Kirik" and a few entries in the Novgorodian First Chronicle.

The monastery owned lands in Vodskaya and Shelonskaya pyatinas making it the fourth-largest landowner among the Novgorodian monasteries. A significant part of its lands were confiscated after the conquest of Novgorod by Moscow however the monastery gradually restored its position thanks to gifts and acquisitions. The hegumen and the monks of the monastery were killed by the forces of Ivan IV during the Massacre of Novgorod. The cult of St Anthony, the founder of the monastery, increased in importance after the miraculous discovery of his remains in 1597. In the second half of the 17th century the archbishops of Novgorod favoured the monastery. Multiple stone buildings were erected and in 1740 a seminary was founded.

The monastery is currently part of the Novgorod United Museum-Preserve and has not been returned to the Russian Orthodox Church.

== See also ==
- Desyatinny Monastery
